= Åboulevarden 69 =

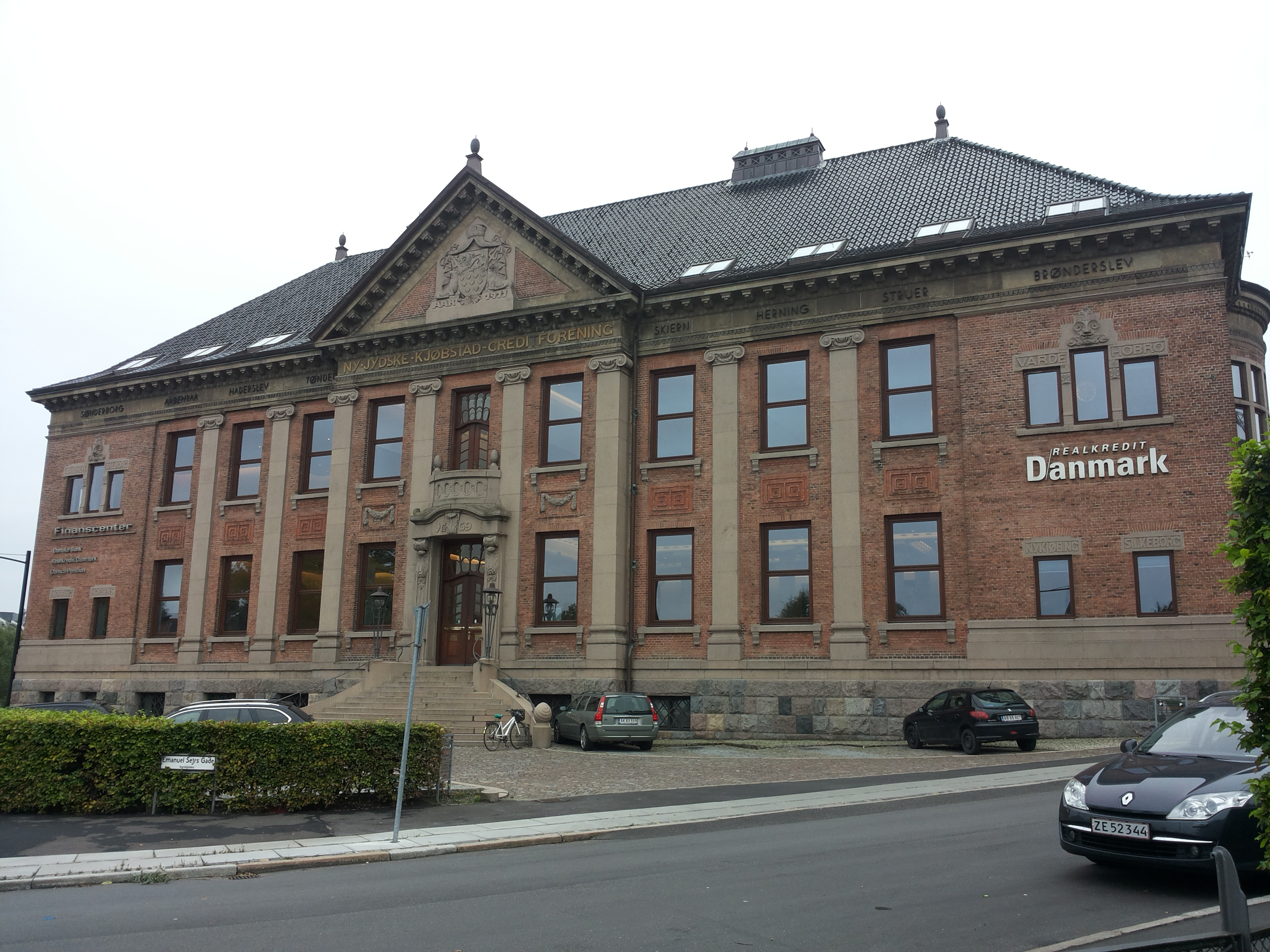
- Facade of Åboulevarden 69
- Interactive map of the Åboulevarden 69 area

General information
- Type: Bank
- Location: Aarhus, Denmark
- Coordinates: 56.1551°N 10.2011°E
- Completed: 1910

Design and construction
- Architects: Eggert Achen; Thorkel Møller; Kjær & Richter

Åboulevarden 69 or Ny Jydske Kjøbstad Creditforening is a building in the city of Aarhus, Denmark, located in the Indre By neighborhood in the Midtbyen district on the street Åboulevarden. The building was constructed in 1910 for the credit union Ny Jydske Kjøbstad Creditforening (New Jut Market Town Credit Union), a name which still adorns the facade of the building. The building has functioned as a financial institution since it was built and as of 2016 was owned by Steen Mengel and rented to Danske Bank, who use it for their main Aarhus branch.

== History ==
The credit union Ny jydske Kjøbstad-Creditforening was established in 1871 in Hjørring, and moved to Aarhus in 1878. It was established by the initiative of municipalities in Jutland to replace the credit union Kjøbstadgrundejere i Nørrejylland, founded in 1851 and bankrupted during the banking crisis of 1857. Initially it was housed in the 1st floor of a building on Immervad owned by the bookseller THeodor Valdemar Thrue. Between 1880 and 1885 the credit union was based on the 1st floor of Hans Broge's house in Mindegade. The organization quickly encountered storage problems as documents had to be stored in fire-safe enclosures. In 1885 the organization got a new building in Grønnegade 71 in a corner building on Nærre Allé. In 1910 a new building was inaugurated on Åboulevarden 69,

== Architecture ==
The building was designed by the architects Eggert Achen and Thorkel Møller for Ny Jydske Kjøbstad-Creditforening. The architectural style is a mix of classical Baroque architecture inspired by the ideals of the renaissance such as English Baroque, and also by Art Nouveau. The imposing expression of the building is a result of the use of red brick, the granite detailing of the outer walls, the granite staircases, and its position some 10 meters from the street. In 1984 the architectural firm Kjær & Richter designed a new wing in red brick on a white, wooden structure. The building was renovated in 1996.
