= Achen (surname) =

Achen is a surname. Notable people with the surname include:

- Eggert Achen (1853–1913), Danish architect
- Georg Achen (1860–1912), Danish painter, brother of Eggert
- Sven Tito Achen (1922–1986), Argentine-Danish writer

== See also ==
- Hans von Aachen (1552–1615), German painter
