= Achen =

Achen may refer to:

- Achen (surname)
- Achen, Moselle, a commune in the Grand Est region of France
- Tiroler Achen, a river in Austria
- Achen Lake, a lake in Tyrol, Austria
- Achen Pass, a pass in the Alps between Austria and Germany
- Achen, a small village by the Mekong River in Kratié Province, Cambodia
- Achen, Malayalam word for Father, also used for addressing Christian priests and presbyters in Malayalam

== See also ==
- Aachen (disambiguation)
