= Augsburg Zoo =

Zoo Augsburg

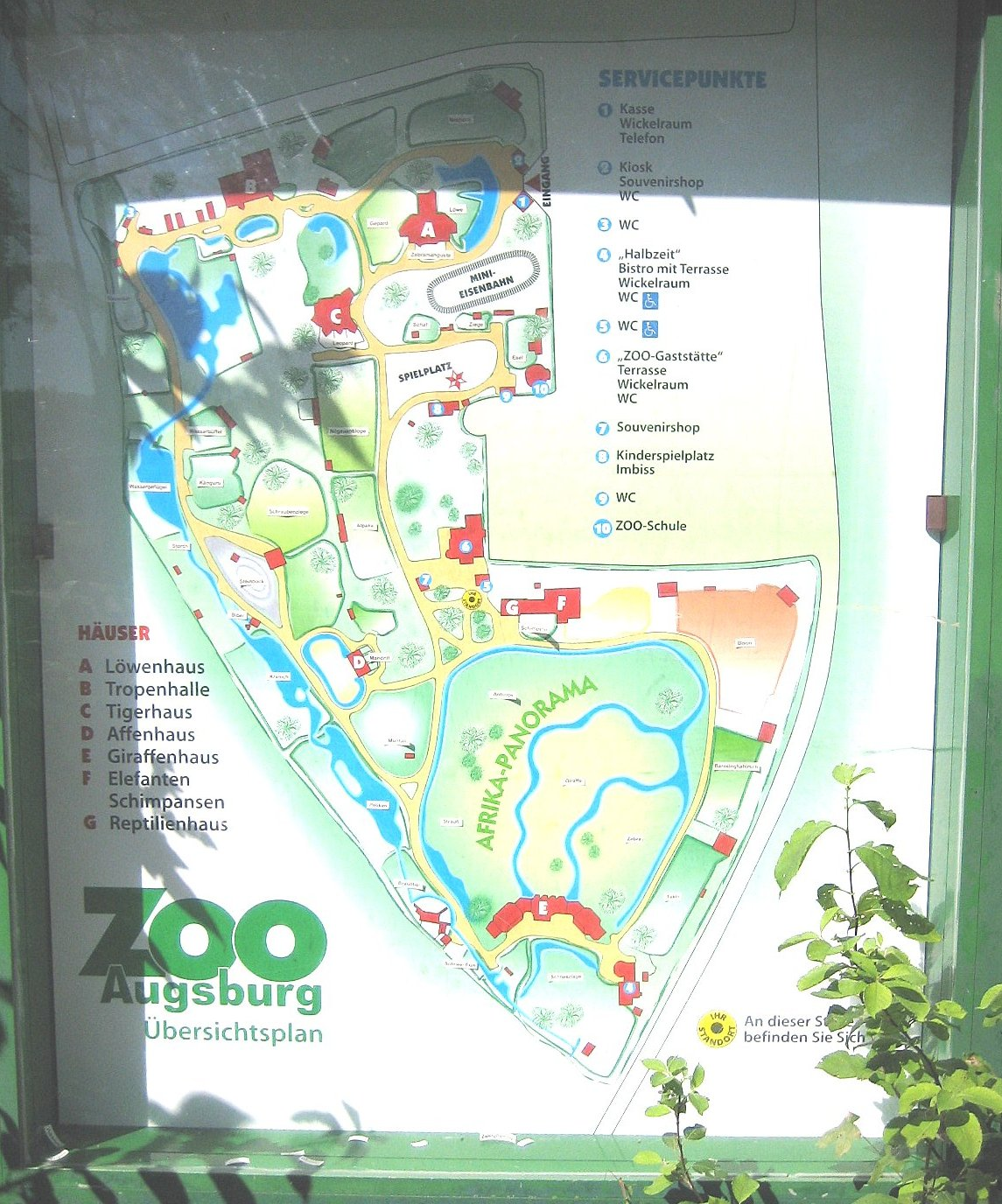
- Interactive map of Zoo Augsburg
- 48°20′52″N 10°54′52″E
- Date opened: 12 May 1937
- Location: Brehmplatz 1, 86161 Augsburg, Germany
- Land area: 22 ha (0.22 km^{2})
- No. of animals: 1245 (2013)
- No. of species: 236 (2013)
- Annual visitors: 600 000
- Memberships: WAZA, EAZA, VDZ
- Owner: Zoologischer Garten Augsburg GmbH
- Director: Barbara Jantschke
- Website: www.zoo-augsburg.de

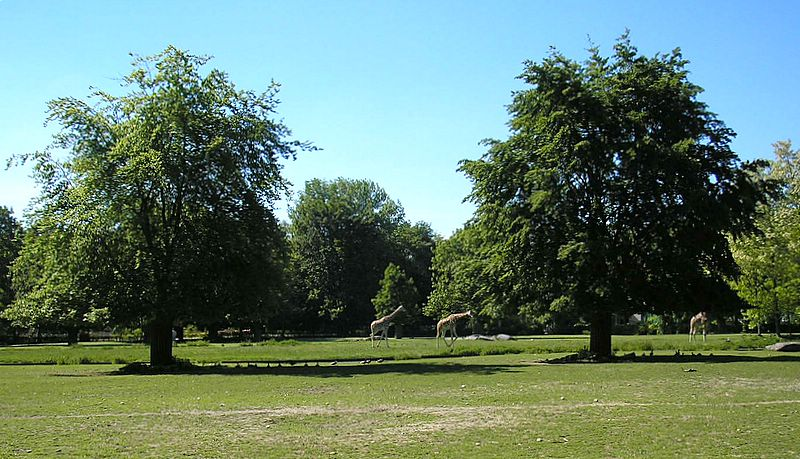
Part of the Africa-Panorama with three Rothschild Giraffes

Augsburg Zoo is a zoo located in the city of Augsburg in Bavaria, Germany, and with over 600,000 visitors annually, the zoo belongs to the 20 largest Zoos in Germany.

Augsburg Zoo holds 1,600 animals belonging to 300 different species. Of those animals, the zoo keeps 100 reptiles and amphibians from 25 species. The zoo is involved in the 18 European Endangered Species Programmes.

== History ==
As early as 800, the town of Augsburg had tropical species of animals within its borders, when Emperor Charlemagne placed his Asian elephant Abul-Abbas in Augsburg. An elephant was a gift to the emperor from the caliph Ar-Rashid, and was walked from Italy through Achen Pass to Germany, and later walked to Augsburg where the emperor preferred to keep his elephant.

In 1410, an enclosure for deer was established at the city wall; these deer were shot by French soldiers in 1796 during the War of the First Coalition. Later on, the Park der deutschen Tierwelt was conceived in order to display German animals. There were also plans to build a traditional Swabian farm, a project which never came to fruition.

During World War II, most parts of the zoo were destroyed; the zoo was closed in 1943, and reopened in 1947.

After the zoo's reopening, the public showed an interest to see exotic animal species. The name was changed to Augsburger Tiergarten after the war, and the first exotic animal species were introduced to the zoo.

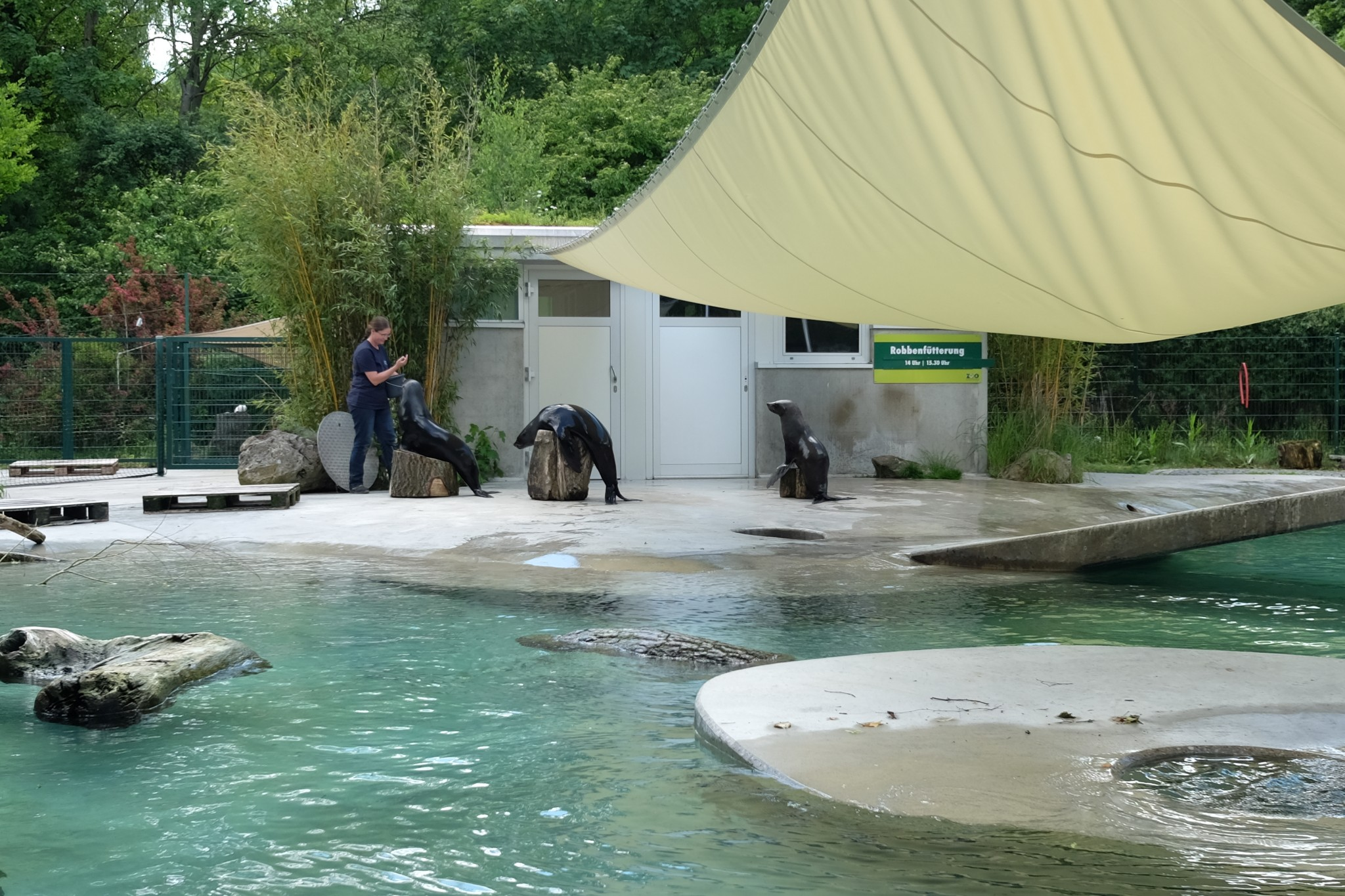
Zoo Augsburg, Seerobben

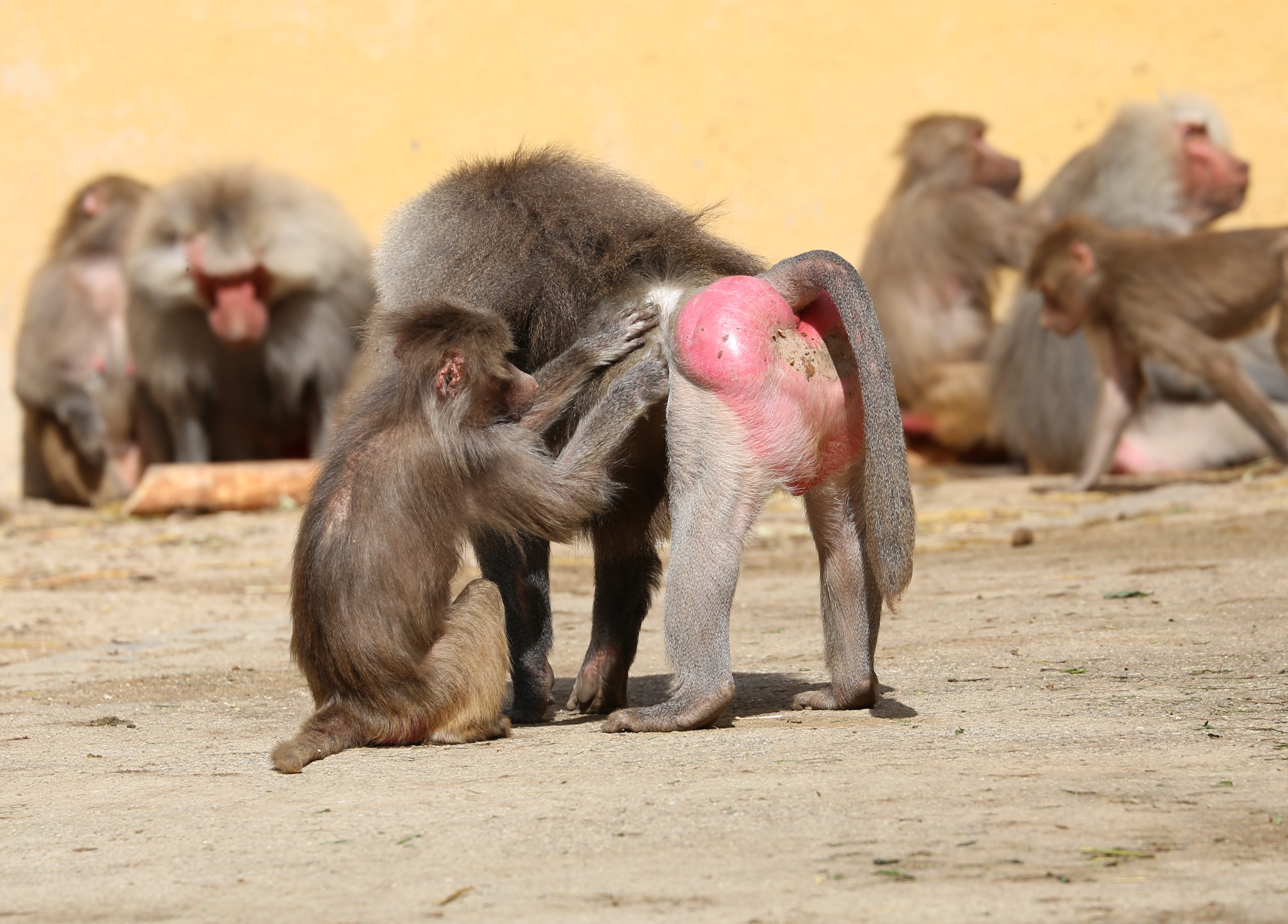
Zoo Augsburg, Affengehege

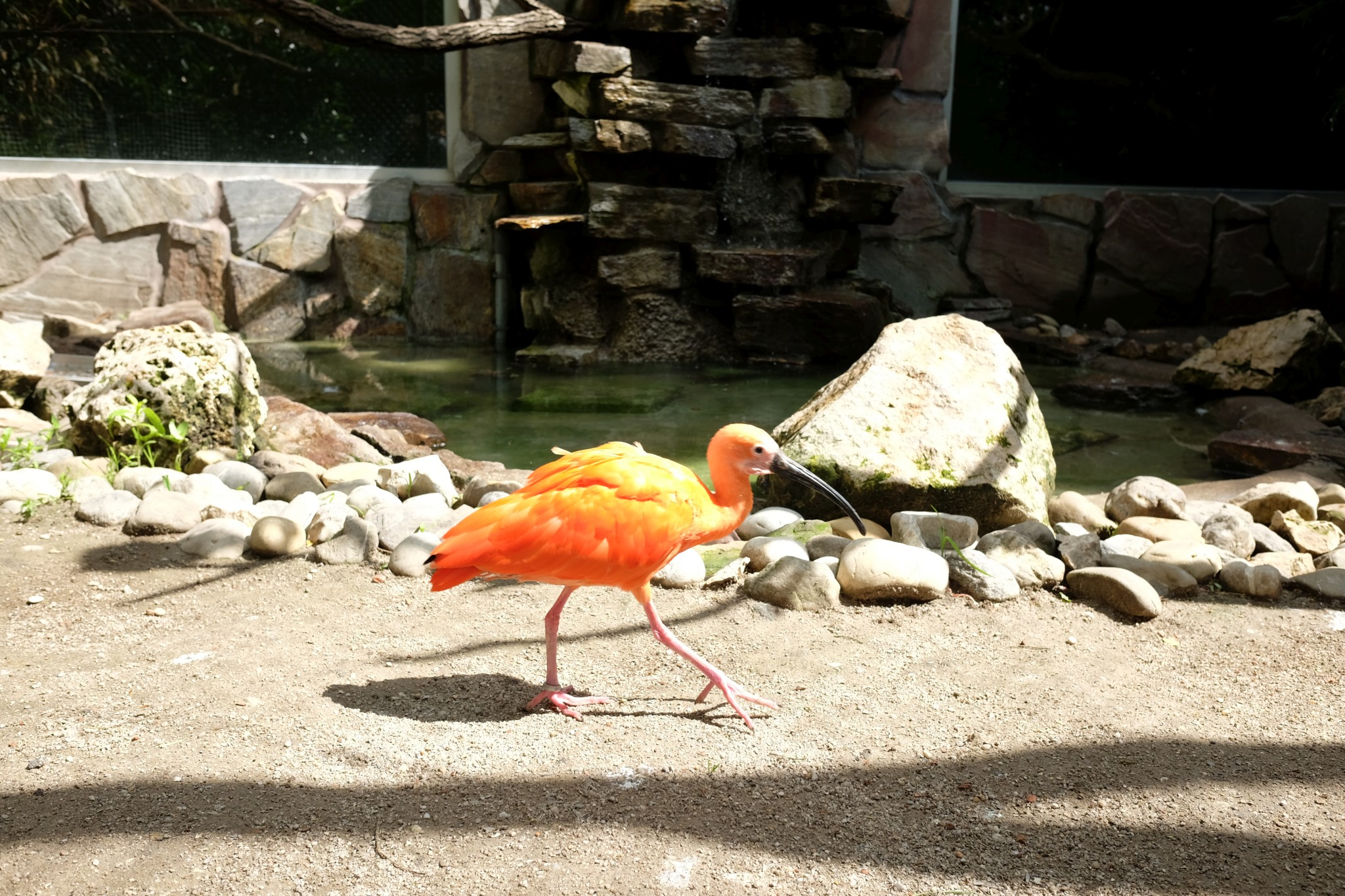
Zoo Augsburg (3)

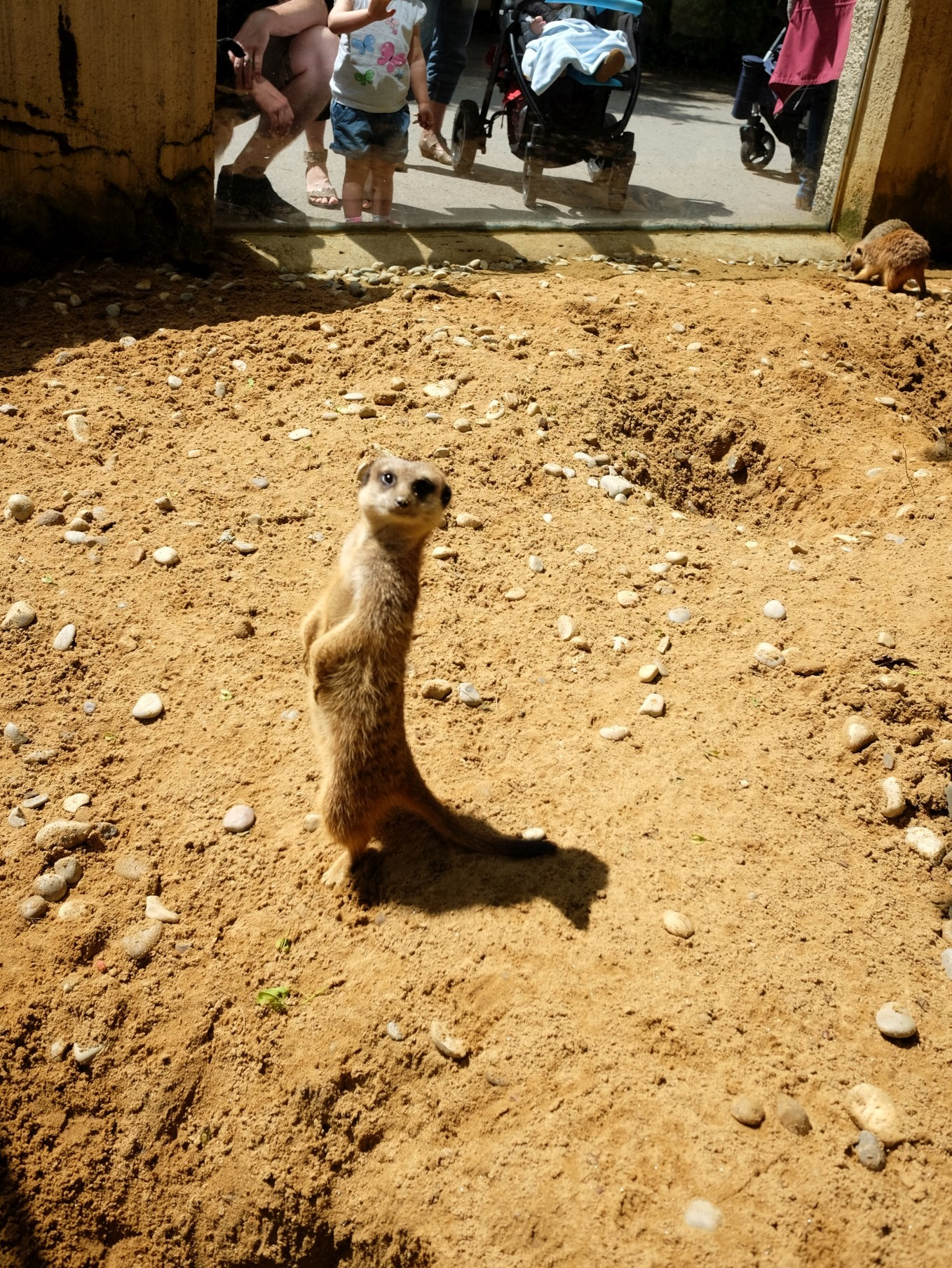
Zoo Augsburg, Erdmännchen 1

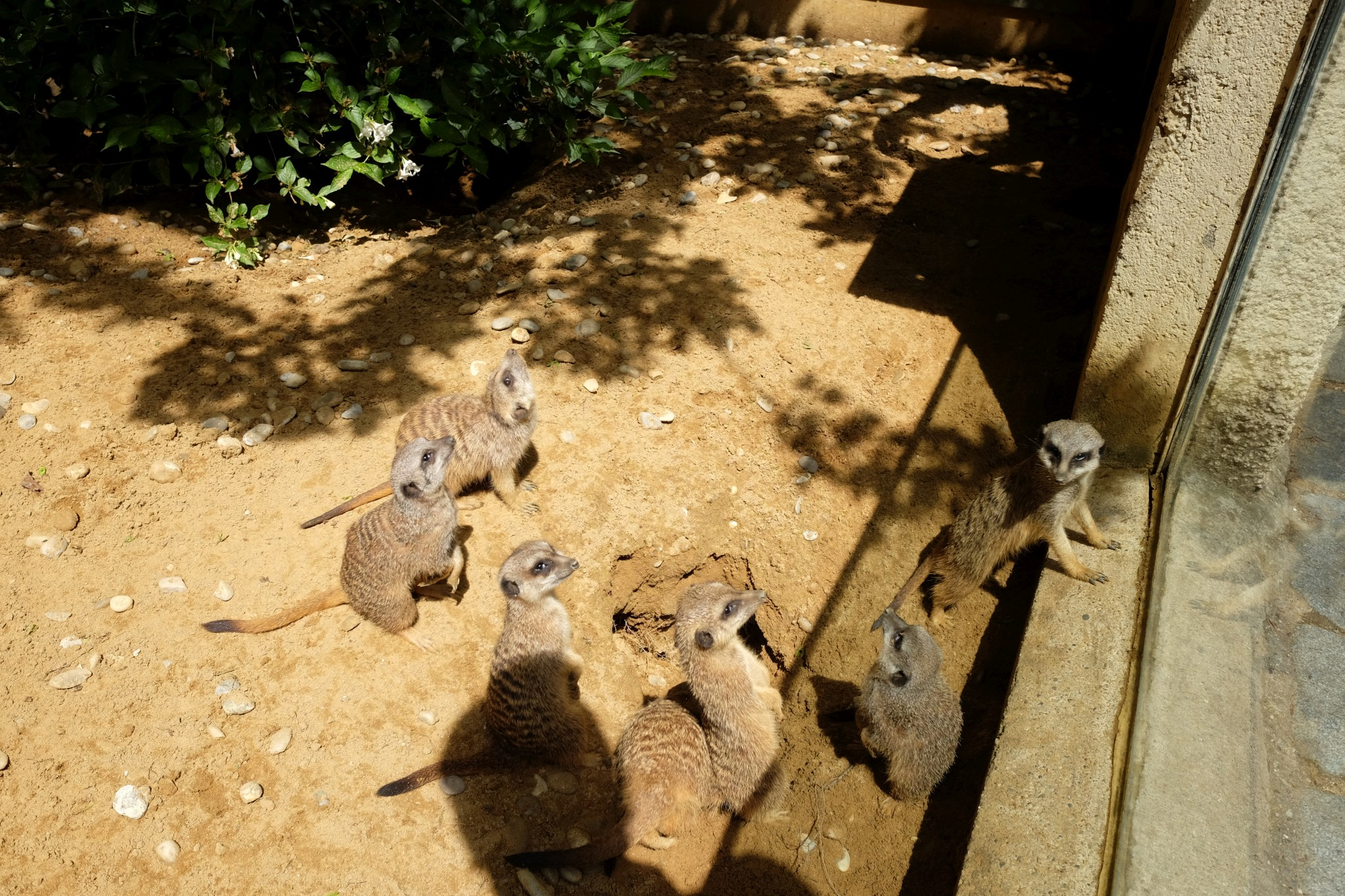
Zoo Augsburg, Erdmännchen 2

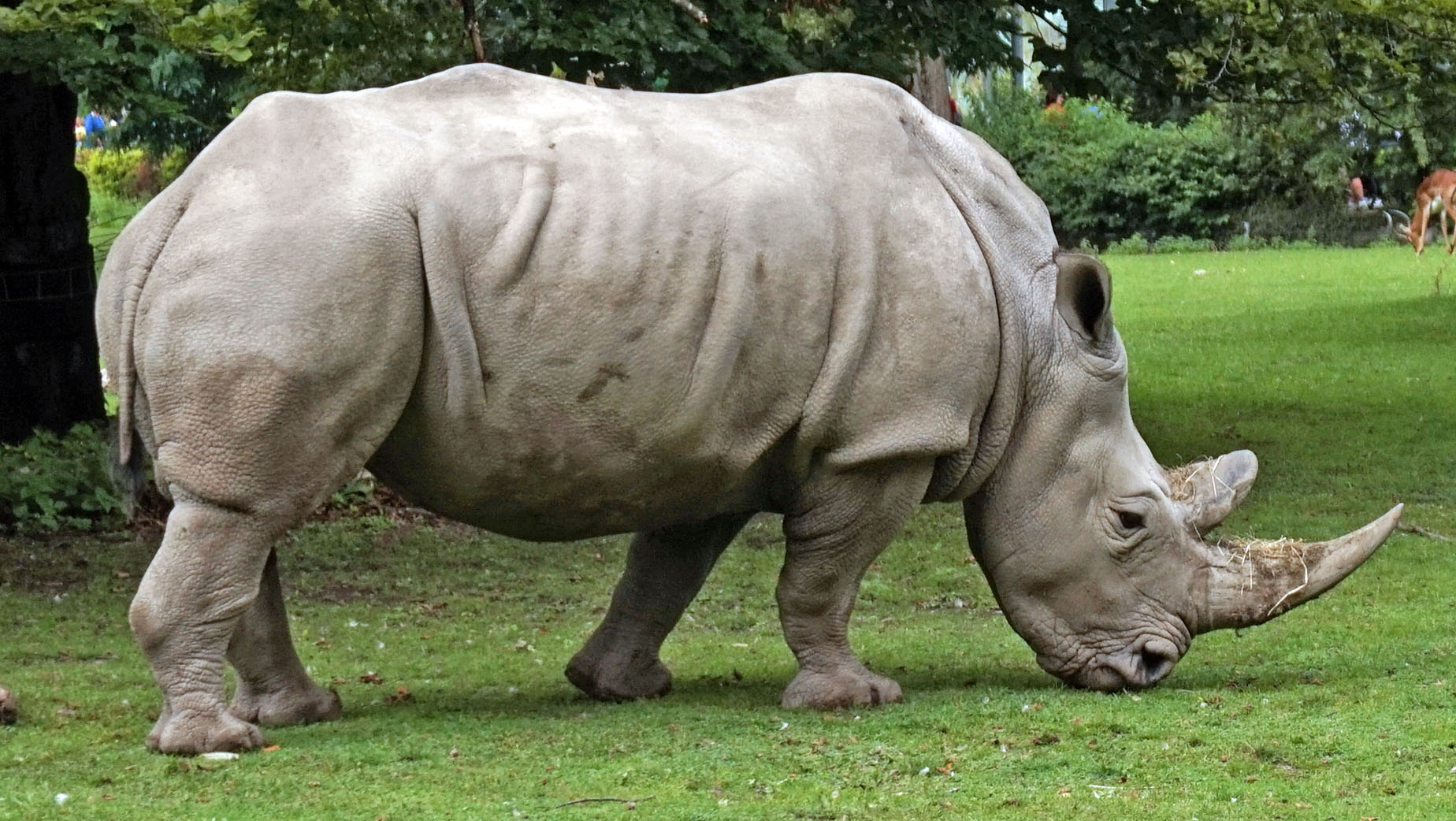
Zoo Augsburg, Nashorn
