= Aachen (disambiguation) =

Aachen is a city in the German state of North Rhine-Westphalia.

Aachen may also refer to:

- Free Imperial City of Aachen (1166–1801), a city of the Holy Roman Empire, formally ruled by the emperor only
- Aachen (district), in the west of North Rhine-Westphalia, Germany
- Aachen (electoral district), an electoral constituency represented in the German Bundestag
- Aachen (meteorite); see meteorite falls
- Hans von Aachen, (1552-1615), German mannerist painter
- Aachen fine cloth
- A family of typefaces designed for Letraset by Colin Brignall

== See also ==
- Aachen Gospels (disambiguation)
- Achen (disambiguation)
