= Kjær & Richter =

Architecture firm in Denmark

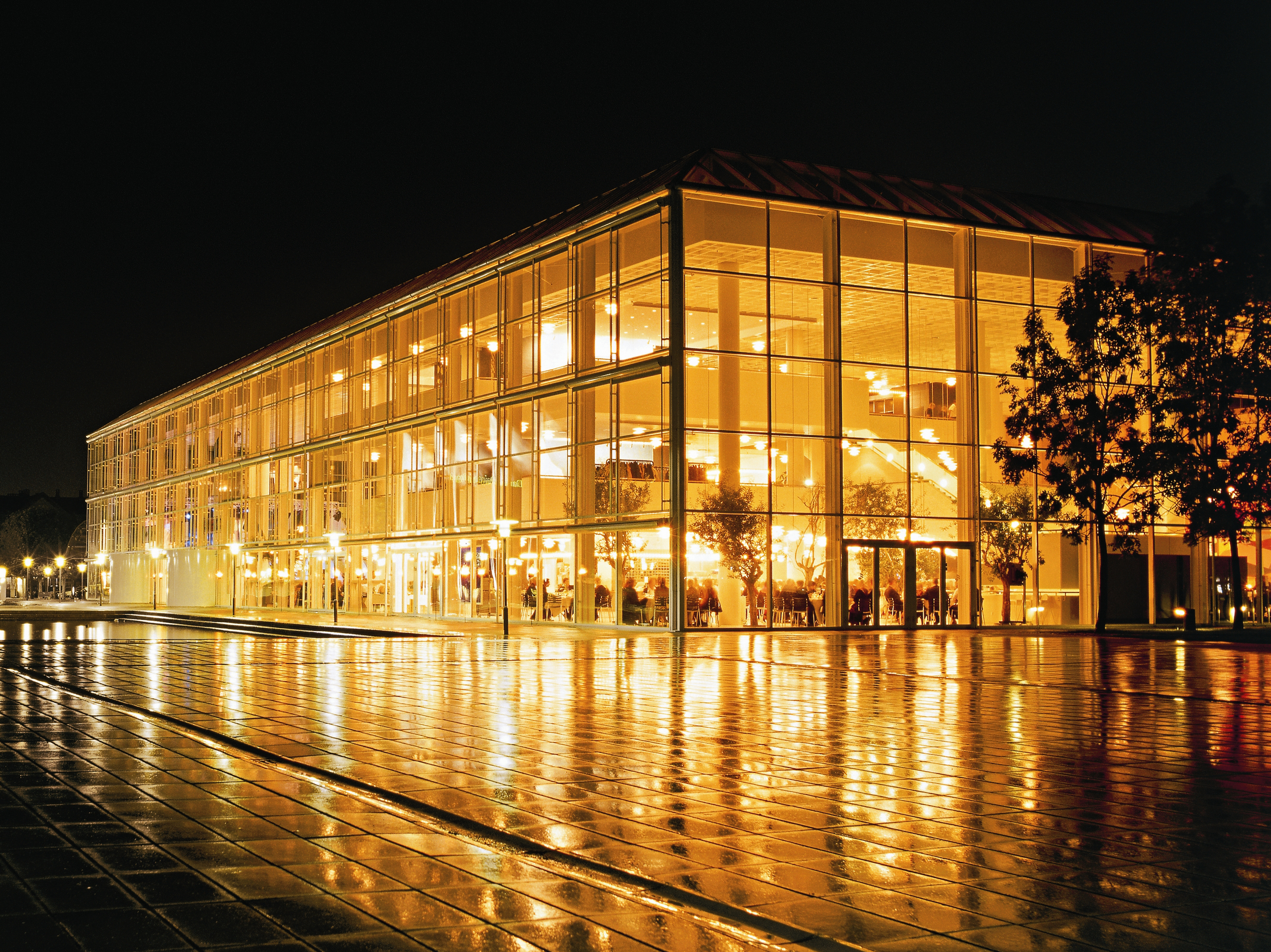
- Aarhus Concert Hall

Practice information
- Founders: Johan Richter; Arne Gravers
- Founded: 1967
- Location: Aarhus

Significant works and honors
- Buildings: Aarhus Concert Hall; Kattegatcentret; Kolding Storcenter

Kjær & Richter is a Danish architectural practice founded in 1967 by Werner Kjær (1924–1998) and Johan Richter (1925–1998). The company is an extension of the practice Richter & Gravers established by Johan Richter and Arne Gravers in 1953.

== Works ==
Kjær & Richter has designed many celebrated buildings across Denmark. A selection of the most notable comprise the following:

Aarhus

- 1959: Århus Statsgymnasium
- 1973: Danish School of Journalism
- 1982: Aarhus Concert Hall
- 1991: Storcenter Nord
- 1992: Business Academy Aarhus, Department in Vejlby, Aarhus
- 1997: Aarhus School of Architecture, extension
- 2014: Navitas Park, education centre at Aarhus Docklands

Grenå

- 1972: Grenaa Gymnasium
- 1992: Kattegatcentret

Vejle

- 1992: Vejle Musikteater
- 2004: Hotel Jacob Gade

Other places

- 1980: Frederiksværk Gymnasium
- 1989: Næstved Storcenter, Næstved
- 1993: Kolding Storcenter, Kolding
- 1997: Kulturhuset, Skanderborg
- 2001: Vestsjællands Kunstmuseum, Sorø
- 2008: University College Vest, Esbjerg
- 2014: PLAZA Design, Aalborg (in collaboration with Kim Utzon)
