= Hotel Royal, Aarhus =

Historic hotel in the heart of Aarhus, Denmark

Hotel Royal
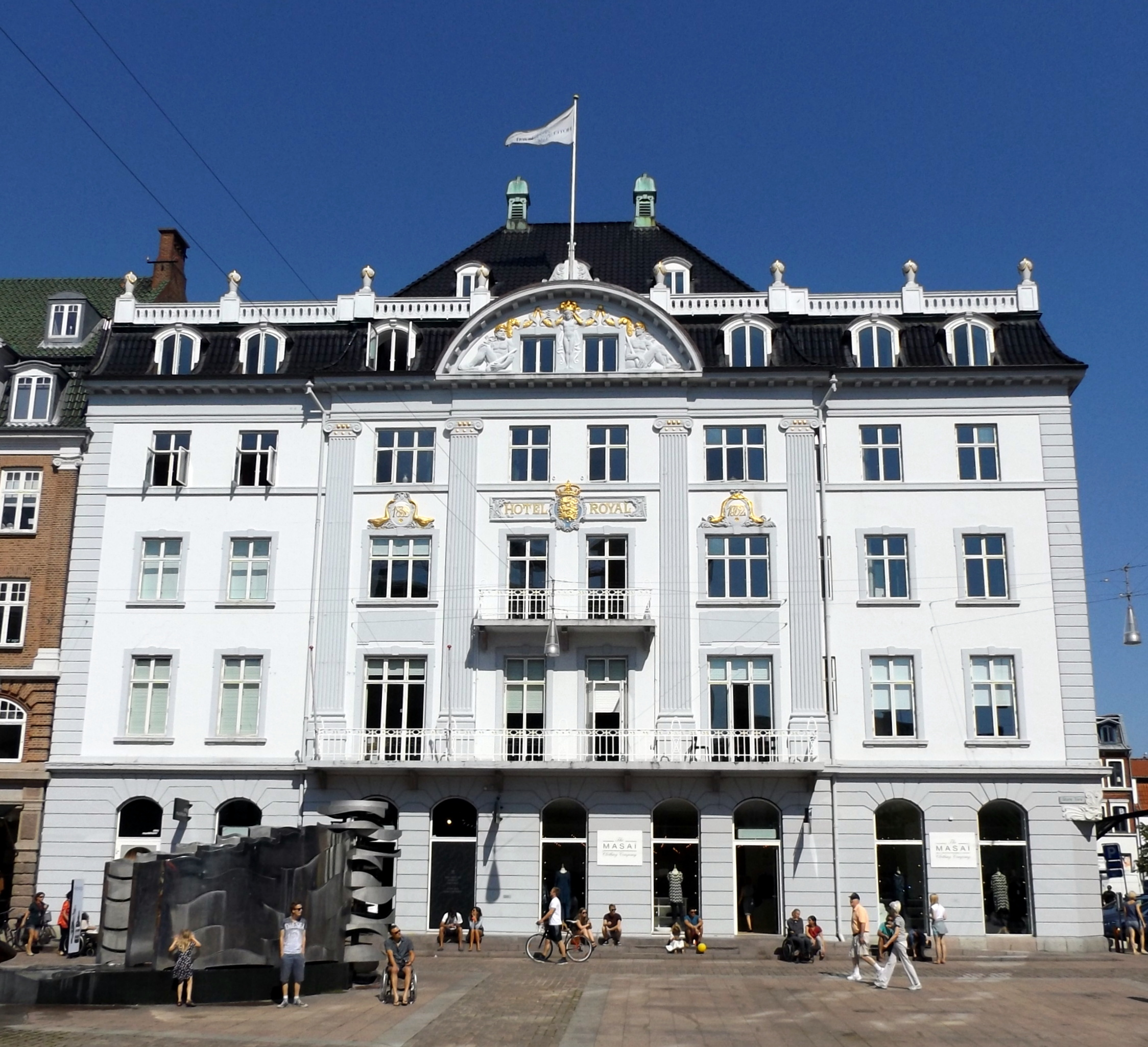
- Front facade of Hotel Royal
- Interactive map of the Hotel Royal area

General information
- Type: Hotel
- Architectural style: Neoclassical
- Location: Aarhus, Denmark
- Coordinates: 56.15747°N 10.20984°E
- Completed: 1901

Technical details
- Material: Brick
- Floor count: 5

Design and construction
- Architects: Thorkel Møller; Eggert Achen

Hotel Royal is a historic hotel in the heart of Aarhus, Denmark, in the central Indre By neighborhood. It overlooks Aarhus Cathedral and the large Store Torv square. The hotel is among the highest ranked hotels in Denmark with a history as the most prestigious in the city.

The hotel, which today has 64 rooms, was founded in 1838 by the innkeeper Niels Larsen from Odense. The new hotel was constructed from two existing buildings overlooking Aarhus' central square. It quickly established a reputation for luxury with clients including royalty, politicians, writers, film stars and singers. It became the foremost hotel in the city and the place for local high society to socialize.

== History ==
The hotel was constructed in 1838 from two existing buildings in Neoclassical style. One of the two buildings was the King's House (Danish: Kongens Gaard) which was the inspiration for the name of the hotel. At the time there was only one other place for lodging in the city and Hotel Royal quickly became a popular destination. In 1881 the hotel was expanded with an extra floor and the facade was renovated in 1865 and 1868. In 1902 a new building was added by designs of Eggert Achen and Thorkel Møller. The new building faces Store Torv and Bispetorv and replaced half of the hotel.

The original owner and founder of the hotel was the innkeeper Niels Larsen from Odense. Niels Larsen died in 1838 and left the hotel to his son Frederik Larsen who managed it until 1873 when he sold it to his brother Carl Larsen and the restaurateur Anders Vincent. In 1876 Carl Larsen became the sole proprietor but in 1894 he sold it to his brother's son Viggo Frederik Sofus Larsen. The hotel stayed in the family another 3 years until it was sold to a commercial entity in 1897.

The hotel catered to the upper-classes and from the beginning offered a number of services. When horses were the preferred means of transportation the hotel had stables, when the first rail connection to Randers was opened in 1862 the hotel acquired a horse drawn bus to shuttle guests between the railway station until 1907. When cars became popular fueling and cleaning services was offered.

In 1913 the Marble Room (Danish: Marmorsalen) was built as a restaurant and it became the social focal point for the upper classes in the city. In 1938 the hotel was renovated again. Through the economic crisis of the 1970s the hotel was threatened by bankruptcy and a number of new activities were attempted. In 1972 the Marble Room briefly became home to the jazz club Royal Birdland which managed to attract international artists such as Count Basie and Duke Ellington. It was a shortlived experiment which ended in 1973 and was replaced by other attempts such as a cinema (1973-1991), steakhouse and discoteque, all which closed again after a few years. In 1983 the hotel changed owners again and was renovated again and the Queens Garden was built and today functions as a restaurant. In 1991 a casino (Casino Royal) opened in the former Marble Room in the basement. The hotel was owned by Jens Richard Pedersen in 2016.

== Architecture ==
The hotel appears as an intricately decorated Neoclassical white structure. In 1991 a casino was established during an extensive renovation by the architects company 3XN. The new establishment was made visible with a new entrance. The design merges past and present with a windbreak of glass with a fan-shaped roof carried by columns and 3 copper caryatids made by local artist Hans Oldau Krull. The design is reminiscent of the art déco entrances of the early 20th century metro stations in Paris.

== Art ==
Hotel Royal has some 300 art works by different artists such as Asger Jorn, Karel Appel, Joan Miró, Wassily Kandinsky and older genre paintings by Wennewald, Høyrup and Friis Hansen, Åge Jensen, Frederik Madsen, Wennermoes, Alex Secher and Adolf Larsen. There are also newer art works by artists who has been good friends of the hotel such as Jørgen Nash, his wife Lis Zwick, Teddy Sørensen, Tine Hind, Margit Enggaard Pedersen, Lene Noer, Axel Lind, Bent Holstein, Karl Johan Sennels, Hans Krull and Per Kramer along with works by multimedia artists such as Johnny Madsen and Peter Viskinde.

The most prolific artist is the Polish painter Andrzej Kowalczyk who has made many of the ceiling paintings and paintings along the main staircase depicting important events in the history of the city such as the inauguration of Aarhus Cathedral, establishment of Aarhus Katedralskole in 1520 and a panorama painting of Aarhus. The walls in the hotel feature paintings of the 53 Danish kings and queens going back to Gorm the Old.
