= Johan Richter (architect) =

- Born: 12 April 1925; Aarhus, Denmark
- Died: 18 April 1998 (aged 73); Aarhus, Denmark
- Education: Royal Danish Academy of Fine Arts
- Occupation: Architect

Johan Vondriak Richter (12 April 1925 – 18 April 1998) was a Danish architect, royal city engineer and professor at the Aarhus School of Architecture.

Richter was originally trained as a carpenter, but in 1947 he became a building constructor. In 1951, he graduated from the Royal Danish Academy of Fine Arts. He was initially employed at C. F. Møller Architects where he worked until 1955. However, while still working for C.F. Møller, he opened the architect's practice Richter & Gravers in 1953 with Arne Gravers. The practice would later be renamed Kjær & Richter, after Gravers left the company and Werner Kjær joined. A major work of the partnership was the Musikhuset Aarhus, also known as the Aarhus Concert Hall. Richter was a professor at the Aarhus School of Architecture from 1965 to 1985, before functioning as the royal city engineer until 1996. He was the architect for Aarhus Cathedral from 1989.

In 1989, Richter was made an Honorary Fellow at the American Institute of Architects.

== Awards ==
- 1965: Danish Wood Award (for Århus Statsgymnasium),
- 1965: Eckersberg Medaillen
- 1988: C.F. Hansen Medaillen
- 1990: Thorsen-Prisen
