= Thorkel Møller =

- Born: 28 July 1868; Sorø, Denmark
- Died: 21 December 1946 (aged 78); Aarhus, Denmark
- Education: Royal Danish Academy of Fine Arts
- Occupation: Architect
- Buildings: Marselisborg Hospital, Aarhus; Hotel Royal, Aarhus

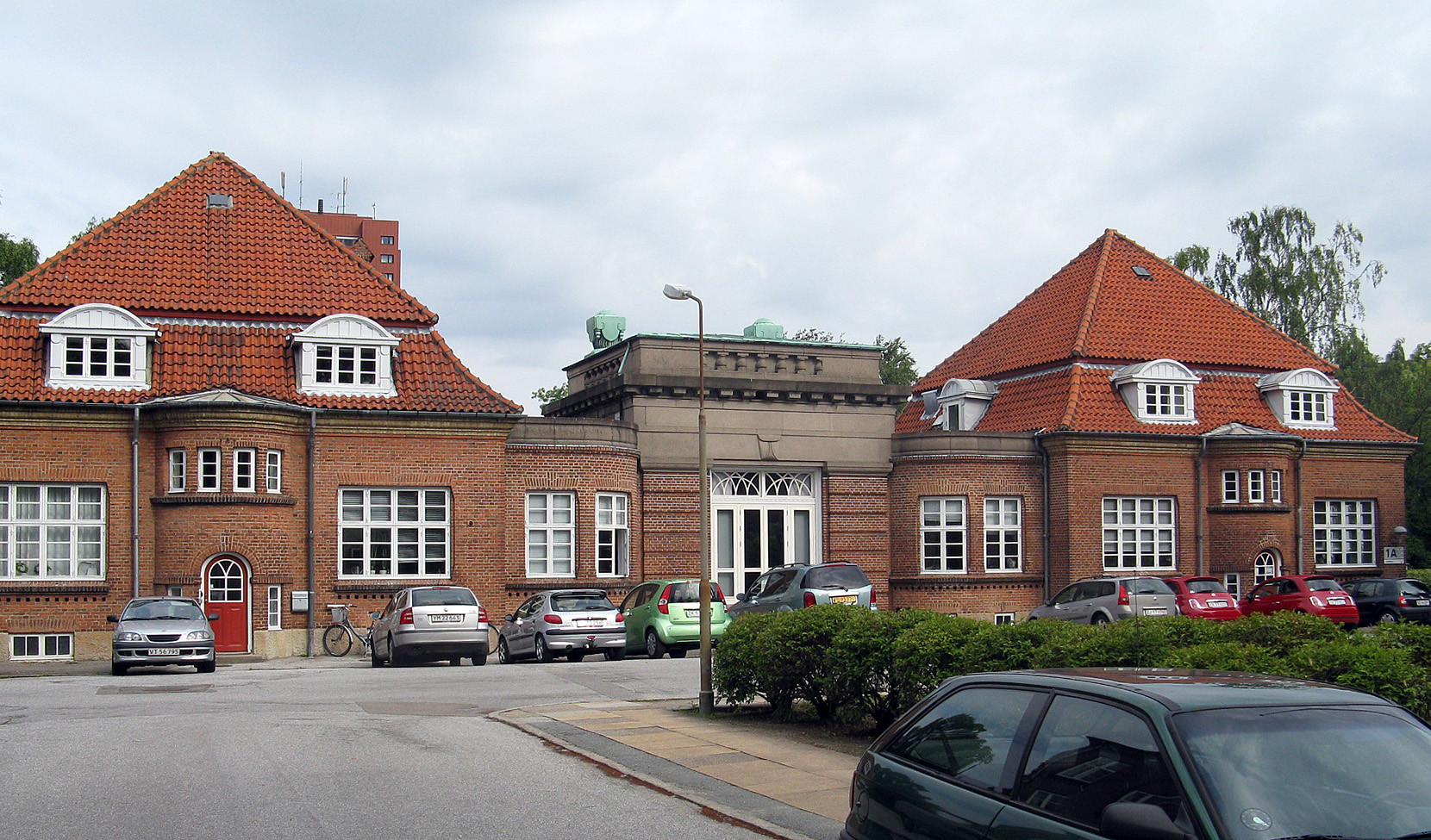
Marselisborg Hospital

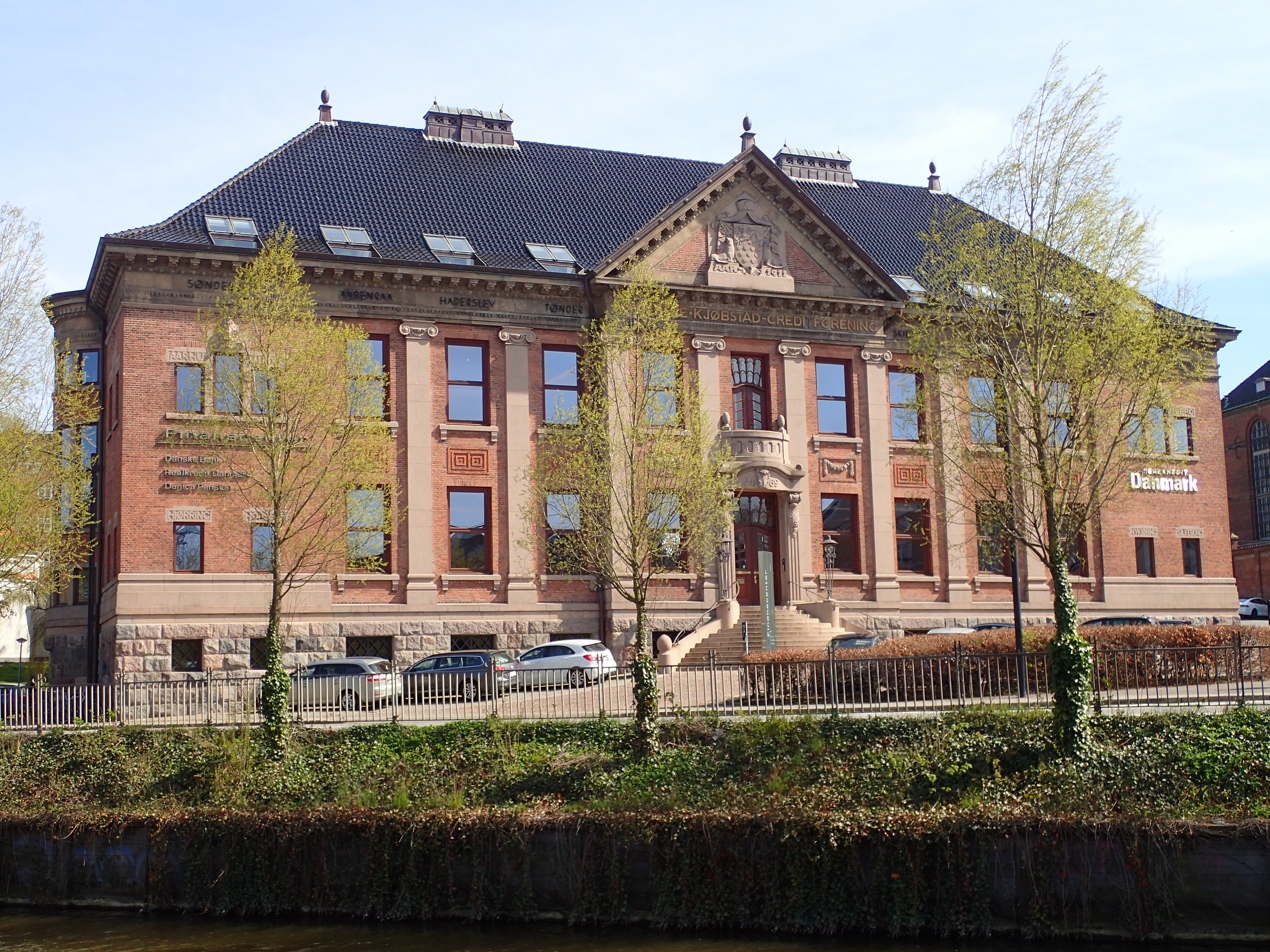
Ny jydske Kjøbstad-Creditforening

Thorkel Luplau Møller (28 July 1868 – 21 December 1946) was a Danish architect who primarily worked in and around Aarhus at the turn of the 20th century. Stylistically he worked in the National Romantic style and later Baroque Revival.

== Biography ==
Thorkel Møller was born in Sorø, Denmark. He was the son of Hans Georg Møller and Julie Augusta Luplau. He moved to Copenhagen where he obtained a degree in architecture from the Royal Danish Academy of Fine Arts, School of Architecture in 1898. He conducted travel studies to Germany and Italy between 1897 and 1900.

He was initially employed by architects Hack Kampmann and Martin Nyrop but in 1900 he was hired by Jydske Landboforeninger in Jutland. In 1902 he exhibited at Charlottenborg Spring Exhibition. Later he established an independent practice. From 1924 until 1946, he was supervisor at the Marselisborg Palace.

Møller died in 1946 at Aarhus.

== Selected works ==
- Hotel Royal (1901, with Eggert Achen)
- Grenaa Handels- og Landbrugsbank (1904)
- Middelfart Rectory (1905)
- St. Joseph's Hospital, Aarhus (1907)
- Ebeltoft Rectory (1908)
- Vejle Rectory (1908)
- Bispehus, corner of Skolegade and Skolegyde (1908)
- Rekreationshjemmet Sixtus, Middelfart (1911)
- Marselisborg Hospital, Aarhus (1911–13)
- Ny jydske Kjøbstad-Creditforening, Emanuel Sejrs Gade, Aarhus (1911–12, with Eggert Achen)
- Sabro Retirement Home (1919)
- Folketeatret, Aarhus (1922)
- Købmands- og Haandværkerbanken, Store Torv 12, Aarhus (1934)
