= Frederiksværk Gymnasium =

Location
- Frederiksværk, Denmark
- Coordinates: 55.6422°N 12.0796°E

Information
- Type: public gymnasium
- Principal: Peter Brink Thomsen
- Enrollment: 475
- Website: Official website

Frederiksværk Gymnasium is a gymnasium (upper secondary school) in central Frederiksværk, Denmark. The building was designed by Kjær & Richter and was inaugurated in 1980.

== Notable alumni ==
- 1990: Tomas Villum Jensen, actor and film director
- 1991: Anders Thomas Jensen, screenwriter and film director
