= Kattegatcentret =

- Interactive map of Kattegatcentret
- 56.4062°N 10.9268°E
- Date opened: 1993
- Location: Grenå, Denmark
- Land area: 5,800 m^{2} (62,000 ft^{2})
- No. of species: 250
- Volume of largest tank: 1,500,000 L (400,000 US gal)
- Annual visitors: 138,072 (2015)
- Memberships: EAZA, DAZA
- Website: Kattegatcentret

Kattegatcentret (The Kattegat Center) is a public aquarium in Grenå, Denmark. Its name refers to the Kattegat sea.

The mission of Kattegatcentret is to mediate knowledge about the sea to the general public, so more people are able to enjoy, understand and guard the seas. Since its opening in 1993, the aquarium has been visited by around 6 million people, with 12,000 schoolchildren and students participating in the centers schoolservice every year. The center was expanded in 2005 and now comprise 5,800 m^{2} (62,000 ft^{2}), with all constructions designed by Kjaer & Richter.

The aquarium is home to more than 250 species from around the world, from the native herring, wolffish and seals (grey and harbour) to tropical lionfish and coral fish and sharks. The animals are on display in large tanks in a variety of engaging ways. The largest tank, Oceanariet, has a volume of 1,500,000 L (400,000 US gal) and shows a native marine scene from the Kattegat itself. It is possible to dive here for visitors. Another large tank is the 550,000-litre (150,000 US gal) tropical shark tank, Hajtanken, which is equipped with a shark tunnel and is home to species such as sand tiger shark, whitetip reef shark, nurse shark and stingrays. The smallest aquaria at the Kattegatcenter contain 250 L (66 US gal).

The Kattegatcenter cooperates on a broad scale with politicians, businesspeople, scientists, institutions and organizations from all over the world. The center is a member of both EAZA and DAZA, two important zoo and aquarium organizations, and are currently working towards being self-sustaining with animals. They have a large breeding program with both native and tropical species.

In cooperation with Danish Technological Institute (DTI) and Aarhus University, The Kattegatcenter created AlgeCenter Danmark in 2011. It is a Danish center for research, innovation and mediation of information about algae. AlgeCenter Danmark has a growing facility for kelp right next to The Kattegatcenter. Every year, the international Nordic Seaweed Conference are held here.
