= Århus Statsgymnasium =

Danish secondary school

Coordinates: 56.94350°N 10.101550°E

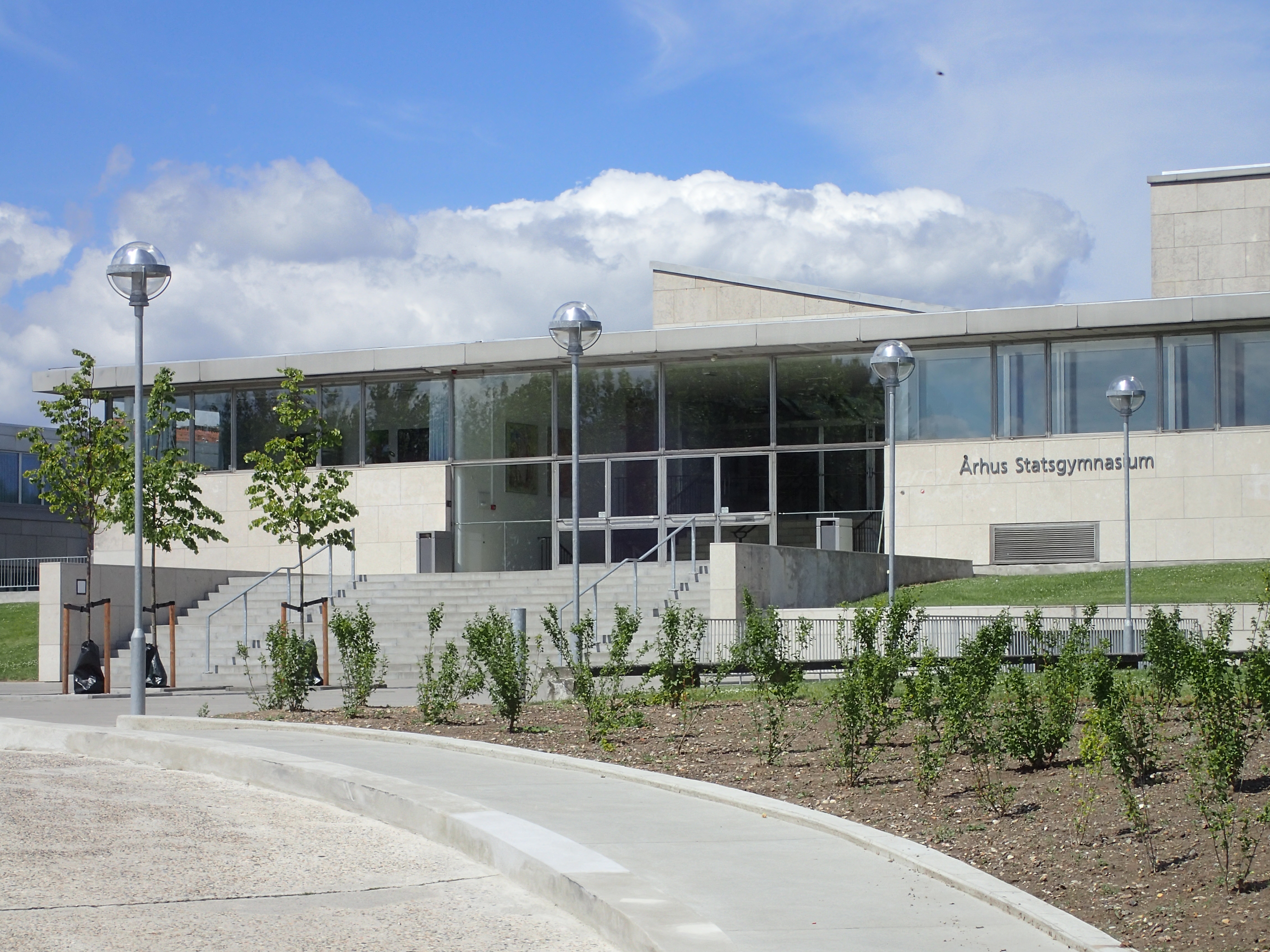
- Århus Statsgymnasium
- Type: Secondary education
- Established: 1953
- Rector: Dorte Fristrup (2015)
- Academic staff: 80
- Administrative staff: 6
- Students: 810 (2014)
- Location: Aarhus, Denmark
- Website: http://www.aasg.dk/

Århus Statsgymnasium is a secondary school and Danish gymnasium in the neighborhood Hasle in Aarhus, Denmark. The school offers the 3 year Matriculation examination (STX) programme. It was the third gymnasium to be built in or around Aarhus and the 38th state gymnasium in the country. The school is an independent self-owning institution under the Danish state with about 800 students divided across 30 classes.

Aarhus Municipality and a number of surrounding municipalities took initiative to build the school in the 1950s. In 1958 a group of students from Marselisborg Gymnasium were transferred and the first classes began August 1958, in rented localities until Juni 1959, when construction on the school had completed. The school was managed by the Danish state until 1986 when supervision was handed over to Aarhus County. In 2007 the Danish counties were disbanded and the school has, like most other Danish educational institutions, been self-owning and independent under the state since then. In 1971 Århus Statsgymnasium started a Higher Preparatory Examination (HF) programme which lasted until 1992.

== Building ==
The building of Aarhus Statsgymnasium is a listed structure. It was the first State Gymnasium to be built as a result of an architectural competition. Only architects from Aarhus County could participate and some 55 submissions entered the contest, eventually won by Johan Richter with a submission incorporating 1950s modernity with elements of 1920s classicism and 1930s functionalism. The Danish state art institution Statens Kunstfond initiated an art project which resulted in a large ceramic installation by Asger Jorn in the foyer.

== Programmes ==
The Matriculation examination (STX) programme is divided into four programmes; natural sciences, political sciences, linguistics and art each composed of a range of elective choices. The school offers the common languages typically seen in Danish high schools including English, German, French and Spanish.

== Notable alumni ==
- 1972: Anne Linnet
- 1979: Elsebeth Egholm
- 1983: Henrik Qvortrup
- 1993: Cindy Lynn Brown
- 1994: Niels Brinck
- 1997: Tina Dickow
- 1998: Asbjørn Sennels
- 2008: Frederik Krabbe
