= St. Joseph's Hospital (Aarhus) =

Former hospital in Aarhus, Denmark

Coordinates: 56°08′40.5″N 10°12′07.1″E

- Sankt Josephs Hospital
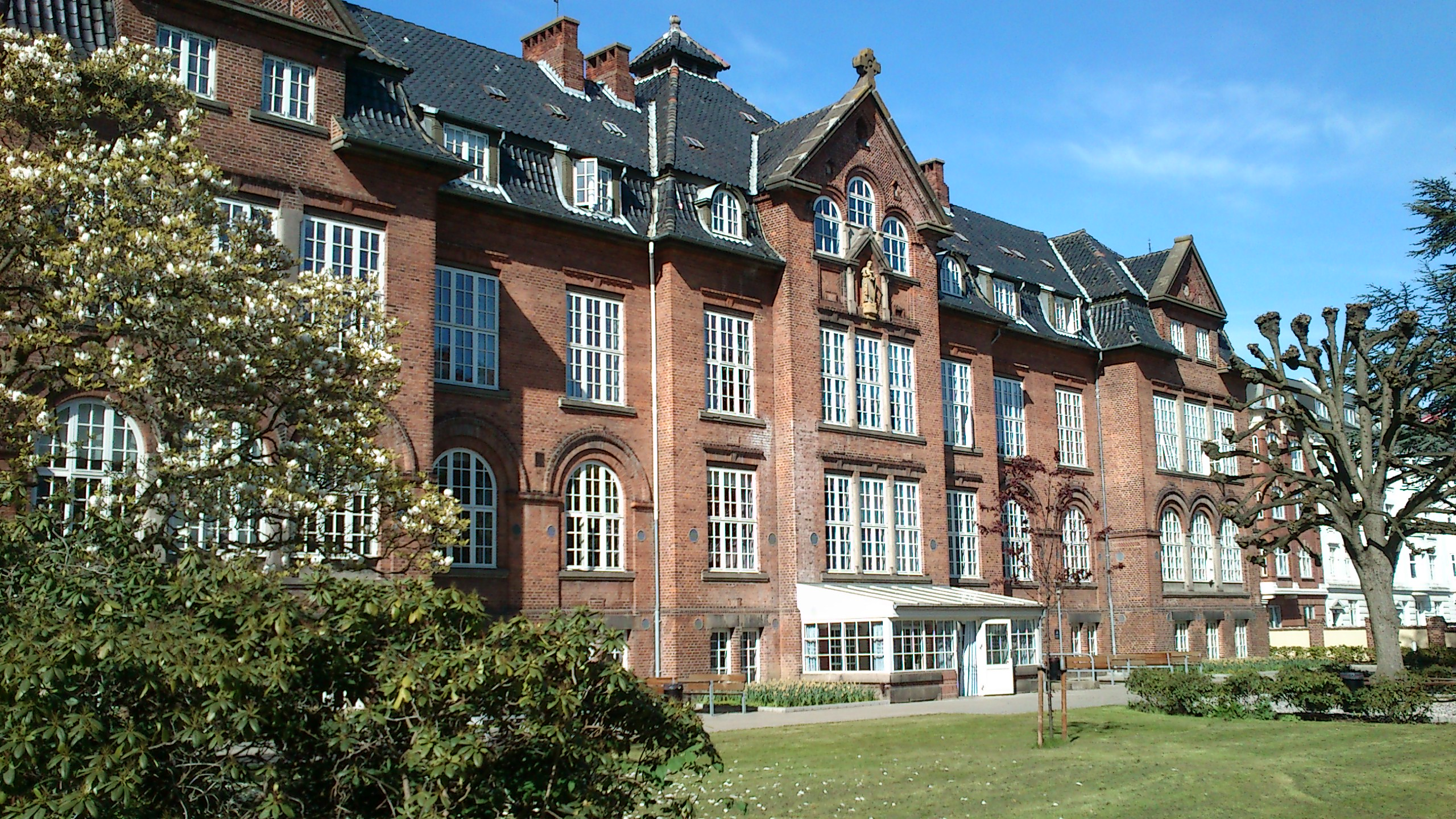
- St. Joseph's Hospital, backside viewed from the garden
- Interactive map of the St. Joseph's Hospital area

General information
- Architectural style: Baroque Revival
- Location: Midtown, Aarhus, Denmark
- Completed: 1907
- Client: Sisters of St. Joseph
- Owner: Kiloo

Design and construction
- Architect: Thorkel Møller

St. Joseph's Hospital (Danish: Sankt Josephs Hospital) is a building and former hospital in Aarhus, Denmark that was built and inaugurated in 1907. It was built for the Sisters of St. Joseph to function as a hospital in the city of Aarhus as a supplement to the public hospitals. It was designed by the architect Thorkel Møller in baroque revival style. The Sisters of St. Joseph operated St. Joseph's Hospital for 64 years until it sold the building to Aarhus County in 1971. It has since housed VUC Aarhus for a number of years and as of 2015 Kiloo owned the building and was planning to make it their headquarters.

== History ==
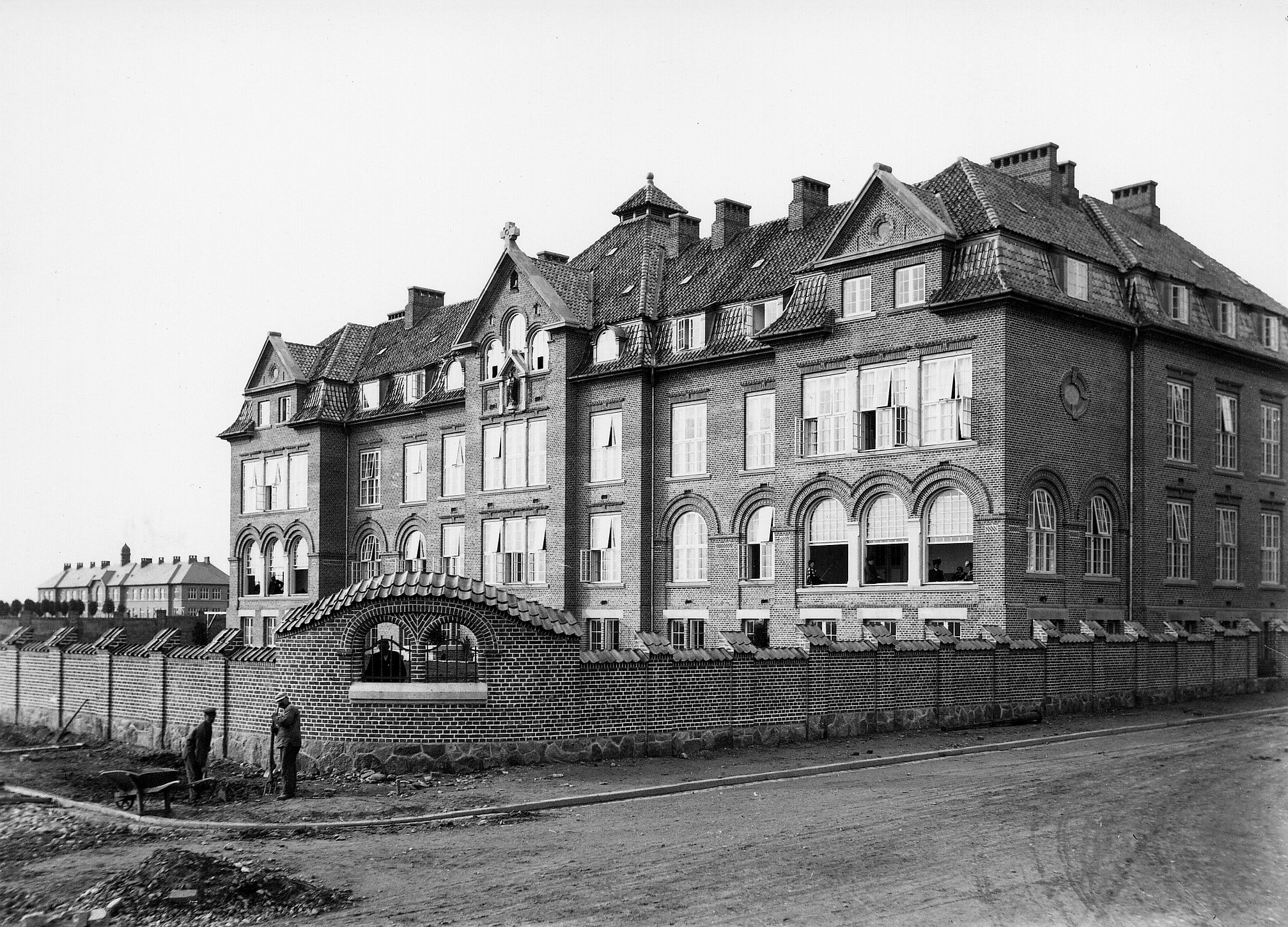
St. Joseph's Hospital in 1907

In the late 1800s the first Catholic nuns since the Reformation arrived in Denmark. Initially, just a few members of the Sisters of St. Joseph who settled in Copenhagen where, in 1875, they opened St. Joseph's Hospital. In Aarhus they established themselves in Ryesgade where they taught girls in the catholic St. Knud's School. It was however through care for the sick that the nuns primarily became known. In the first years, the nuns treated patients of any faith in private homes. In December 1900 the municipal doctor on behalf of the sisters requested support from the city council for a polyclinic with 20 beds for the poor and needy. The nuns worked fast and the clinic was opened shortly before the end of year 1900.

It was however not without controversy since a local protestant organization had also offered to open a polyclinic. The city council opted to support the catholic sisters and this offended the local protestant priests. The controversy never escalated beyond strongly-worded letters in Århus Stiftstidende and other Danish papers, but it became a public spectacle involving priests and public servants. It was also symptomatic of the relationship between Catholics and Protestants in the years after reformation. In spite of the controversy the sisters' polyclinic became a success and after a few years it moved to larger rooms in Østergade. This proved to be a temporary solution and in April 1902 the nuns asked to buy a parcel of land from the city. The negotiations took almost 2 years until February 1904 when a deal was reached for the sisters' to buy a property on Frederiksbjerg by Tietgens Plads. The hospital was built with patient rooms, laboratories, nurseries, operating rooms and a bath house. The upper floor was reserved as the sisters' living quarters while the polyclinic moved into the basement. The hospital was run jointly with municipal hospitals and management of St. Josephs Hospital was done in close cooperation with other hospitals in the city.

Initially, St. Joseph's Hospital was divided in departments with each one chief physician. The first departments were the departments of medicine, neurology, ears, orthopedic and tuberculosis. Over time the departments were moved out of St. Joseph's and into the hospitals in the city. St. Josephs became a hospital for people with long-term illnesses or who needed rehabilitation. In addition, the hospital had a large number of private care patients. In 1957 18 nuns trained as nurses lived in the hospital. Over time the number of nuns fell and in 1970 the Sisters of St. Joseph had to sell the building to Århus County. The last nuns were allowed to stay but in 1976 the last of them left. At the time St. Josephs had gotten the reputation as a hospice. The County continued to run St. Josephs's but in 1986 the last 18 patients were moved to Marselisborg Hospital. The building continued to house facilities for a center for treatment of psycho-physical disorders and a center for treatment for hearing- and speech.

VUC Aarhus used the building as a school from 1987 to 2013 when Mogens de Linde bought it. In 2015, the computer games development company Kiloo bought the buildings, which underwent a lengthy renovation before being made their new headquarters in January 2018.

== Architecture ==
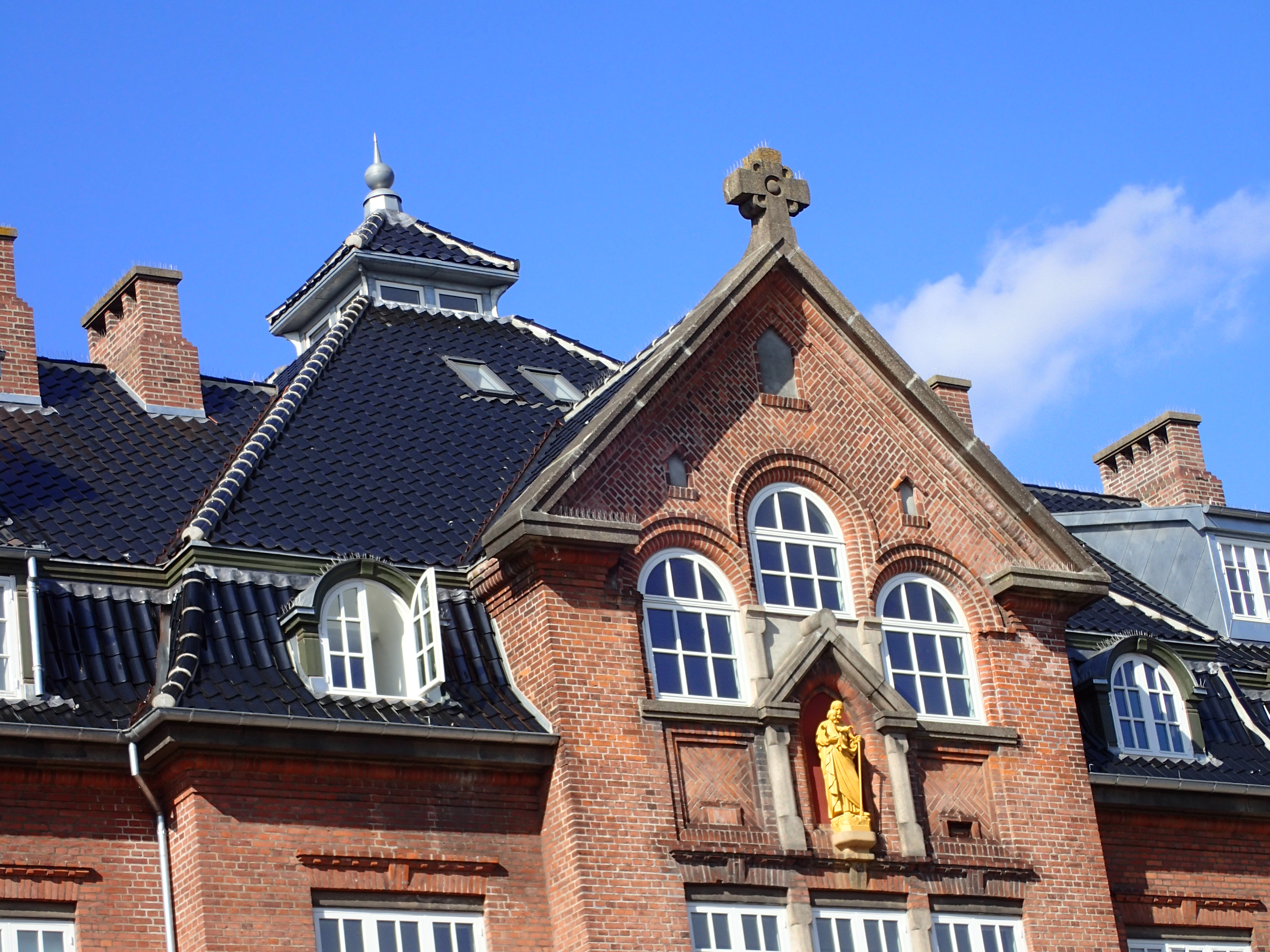
Detail showing the mansard roof among other elements

St. Josephs Hospital was designed by the architect Thorkel Møller in baroque revival style. The building is constructed of red brick in two and half floors capped with a mansard roof. The upper floor under the mansard was designed for the nuns with homes and prayer room. South of the main building lies a small garden, surrounded by a brick wall capped with glazed black bricks.

== See also ==
- Architecture of Aarhus
