= Varna Palæet =

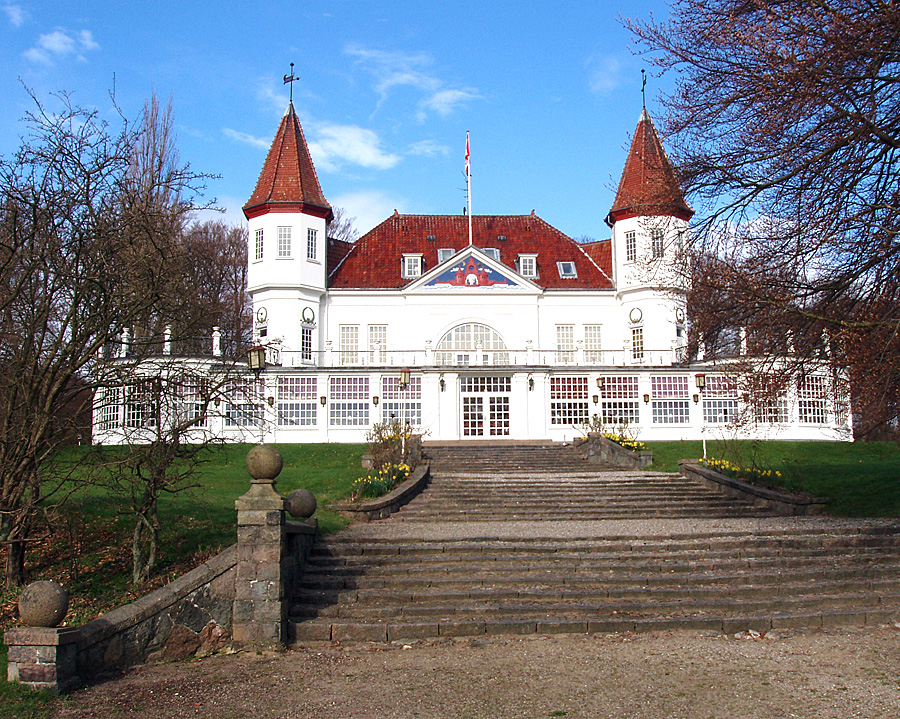
- Front facade of Varna Palæet
- Interactive map of the Varna Palæet area
- Alternative names: Varna Pavillionen

General information
- Type: Restaurant
- Architectural style: Neoclassical
- Location: Aarhus, Denmark, Ørneredevej 3, 8000 Aarhus C
- Coordinates: 56.1248°N 10.2162°E
- Named for: Bulgarian city of Varna
- Completed: 1908

Design and construction
- Architect: Eggert Achen

Varna Palæet (Lit.: Varna Palace) or Odd Fellow Palæet Varna (Odd Fellow Palace Varna) is a building in Aarhus, Denmark situated in the Marselisborg Forests on Ørneredevej. Varna Palæet was built in 1908 by designs of the Danish architect Eggert Achen in Neoclassical style for the Danish National Exhibition of 1909. Today the building is owned by the Odd Fellows society which use it for activities within the organization. The building houses a restaurant on a lease basis and it is a well-known landmark in Aarhus and its southern forests.

== History ==
The name of the building can be traced back to 1829 when the owner of a mill on the site advertised for "Varna Mill" (Varna Mølle) in Århus Stiftstidende. The name was given to the mill by Christian A. Gersdorff, the Baron of Marselisborg Manor, who had served as a general in the army of the Russian Tsar on the Black Sea coast. He encountered the names Varna and Silistria there and named two mills on his property after them. Both names refer to cities in modern northeastern Bulgaria, then under Ottoman rule, that were subjected to prolonged Russian sieges during the Russo-Turkish War of 1828–29. In 1877 the mills were abandoned.

In 1909 Aarhus was the host of the Danish National Exhibition of 1909 and it was decided to build a number of restaurants in the Marselisborg Forests to the south of the city to host some of the many guests. Varna Palæet is a result of this decision and it was completed in time for the exhibition along with another pavilion, Ørnereden (English: Eagles Nest). Onlye Varna Palæet remains today as Ørnereden burnt down in 1980.

The first host of Varna Palæet was S.P. Nielsen who put a lot of focus on entertainment in order to lure people away from the established entertainment venues in the city. In the first years the Varna Soiré (Varna-Soiréen) started in 1913 was the best known tradition featuring known actors, musicians, cabaret- and opera singers and poetry recitals. Excursions to Varna quickly became popular partly because the Marselisborg Forests already was a popular destination. In 1913 12.000 people traveled on the two boats "Turisten" and "Marselisborg" from the Custom House to Varna and Ørnereden.

In 1919 S.P. Nielsen was superseded by Adolf Kragh-Hansen as the host of Varna where he remained for 23 years. The venue continued being popular and in 1936 some 20.000 people attended the summer "solstice" celebrations with entertainment by orchestras, tango-contests, gypsies and operetta. In 1942 Kragh-Hansen retired and Marinus Nielsen took over the venue. Until 1970 Varna Palæet was owned by Aarhus Municipality but with the advent of television in the 1960s entertainment changed and venues such as Varna became less popular. Varna was hit especially hard since its success was premised on its ability to attract visitors for entertainment and exhibitions. The pavilion became increasingly costly to run and in 1970 it was sold to the Odd Fellows which renamed it to Odd Fellow Palæet Varna.

In 1971, the pavilion was extensively renovated and the 1st floor made into meeting rooms for the society. Verner Panton was tasked with decorating the ground floor which continued as a public restaurant. The classical decorations were removed in favor of psychedelic patterns in aubergine, orange, red and purple and furniture in steel and plastic. The new design lasted five years until the walls were painted white again in 1976. The restaurant has since been leased by various restaurateurs. In 1984 and 2010 Varna Palæet was renovated again.

== Architecture ==
The building was designed by the architect Eggert Achen who also designed Ørnereden, the other pavilion in the Marselisborg Forests. The initial plans spanned a small, simple bar to a large hotel and resort. The final plans were accepted by the city council on 16 January 1908 and Eggert Achen quickly began construction so the building could be completed for the opening of the National Exhibition in May 1909. The pavilion is in two floors and has two characteristic octagonal towers. The towers are inspired by the Coat of arms of Aarhus but were initially criticized for being too pompous and a bad fit for the surrounding nature. The pavilion is predominantly of wood and designed in Neoclassical style.

In 1915 Varna Palæet had a pavilion of glass added to better serve outdoor during the summer. In 1916 Aarhus Municipality added electrical lighting and in 1930 central heating which expanded the season with a few months.
