= Aachen Gospels =

The Aachen Gospels may refer to either of two illuminated manuscript gospel books:

- The Aachen Gospels (Ada School), a masterpiece of Carolingian art made in the 9th-century
- The Liuthar Gospels, a masterpiece of Ottonian art made about 973 at Reichenau
