= Sven Tito Achen =

Argentine-Danish writer and author on heraldry (1922–1986)

Sven Tito Achen (born 29 July 1922 in Buenos Aires, Argentina; died 14 November 1986) was an Argentine-Danish writer and author on heraldry, co-founder of the Scandinavian Society of Heraldry (Societas Heraldica Scandinavica) and the first editor of the Scandinavian Heraldisk Tidsskrift (Heraldry Journal) published in Denmark.
