= Georg Achen =

Danish painter

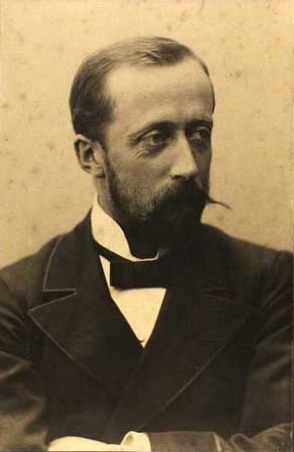
Georg Achen

Georg Nicolai Achen (23 July 1860 – 6 January 1912) was a Danish painter. One of the more accomplished Naturalists of his generation, from the 1890s he specialized in portraits.

== Biography ==
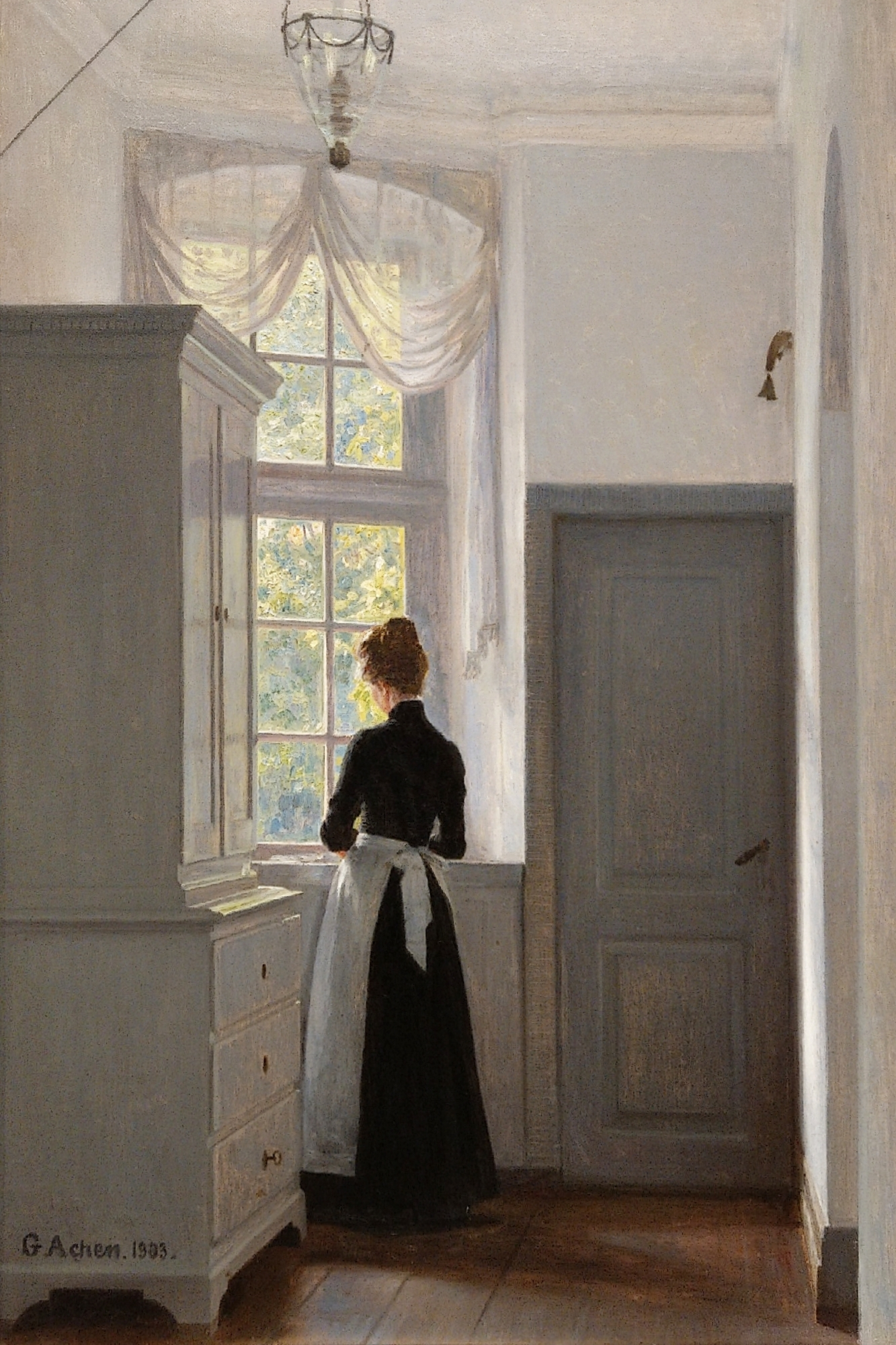
Georg Achen: Drømmevinduet (1903)

Born in Frederikssund and moved with his family to Copenhagen in 1871, he was the younger brother of the architect Eggert Achen. Achen first studied painting under Vilhelm Kyhn before attending the Royal Danish Academy of Fine Arts from 1877 to 1883. Thereafter he studied under P.S. Krøyer at Kunstnernes Frie Studieskoler. He first exhibited at Charlottenborg in 1883 and at Den Frie in 1896.

In the 1880s, he painted mainly landscapes but from the 1890s, he became one of Denmark's most popular portraitists, creating especially artistic paintings of members of his family. Under the influence of Vilhelm Hammershøi, his interiors with a dark female figure in pink, grey and brownish hues testify to his simple, aesthetic approach. One of his most appreciated works is Drømmevinduet (The Dream Window), an oil painting of a maid peering out of one of the windows in Liselund Slot, painted in 1903.

Georg Achen died in Frederiksberg on 6 January 1912.

== Awards ==
In 1890, Aachen was awarded the Thorvaldsen Medal for Min Moders Portræt, a portrait of his mother .

== Literature ==
- Georg Achen: maler og samler. Randers kunstmuseum. 1987. ISBN 978-87-88075-22-9.
