= Cindy Lynn Brown =

Danish-American poet

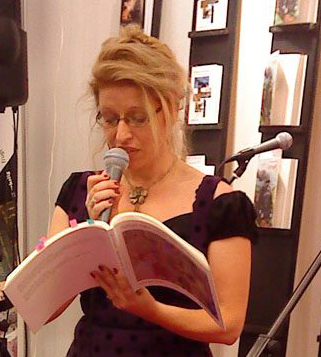
- Born: 1973 (age 52–53)
- Education: University of Southern Denmark; Université de Nancy II
- Writing career
- Genre: poetry
- Website: cindylynnbrown.com

Cindy Lynn Brown (born 1973) is a Danish-American poet. In 2013, she received the Danish Agricultural cultural foundation poetry award.

== Biography ==
Brown was born in Aarhus and is of Jewish descent. She grew up in Denmark, the US and UK and later on also lived and studied in France. She has a degree in literature and creative writing from University of Southern Denmark and Université de Nancy II.

Brown has published six collections of poetry and one novel and she is translated into French, Italian, Bengali, Slovene, Chinese, Korean and Croatian. She has also contributed poems and short stories to various magazines, reviews and anthologies. Brown is the organizer of the International poetry festival Odense Lyrik which takes place every year in March. The festival has existed since 2007.

== Awards ==
- Danish Agricultural cultural foundation poetry award, 2013

== Bibliography ==
- A til B Z til Fisk, 2019 (poems)
- Dealbreaker, 2017 (poems)
- Ingen kan se os bagfra, 2016 (poems)
- The lungs are strangers inside, 2015 (poems)
- Din lille darling, 2014 (poems/short prose)
- Game, 2014 (poems)
- Mute, 2013 (novel)
- Rigtige børn vokser - ikke op i forbifarten, Spring Publications, 2011
- Ildebefindende, Spring publications, 2010
- Korrektur, Spring Publications, 2009
