= Musikhuset Aarhus =

Concert hall in Aarhus, Denmark

Coordinates: 56°09′10″N 10°11′59″E

- Musikhuset
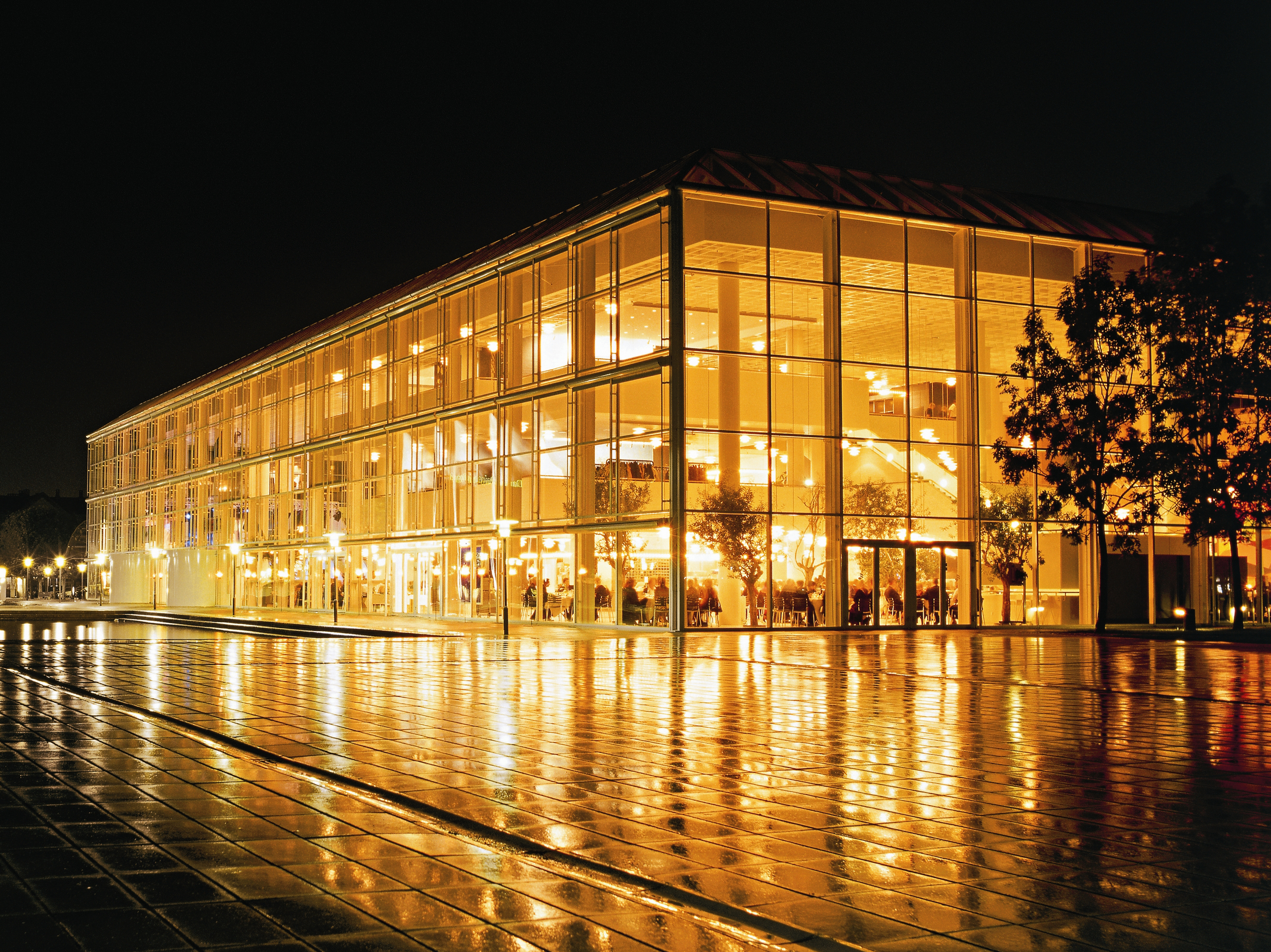
- Musikhuset Aarhus by night
- Interactive map of Musikhuset Aarhus
- Address: Thomas Jensens Allé; Aarhus; Denmark
- Capacity: 1,572 (Large Hall)
- Type: Concert hall

Construction
- Opened: 1982
- Rebuilt: 2005–2008
- Architects: Kjær & Richter, C. F. Møller Architects

Website
- Musikhuset Aarhus

Musikhuset Aarhus (Aarhus Concert Hall) is a large concert hall complex in Aarhus, Denmark. Located in the city centre, Musikhuset is Aarhus' main venue for music and with seating for more than 3,600 people in total, it is the largest concert hall in Scandinavia. Musikhuset Aarhus was designed by Kjær & Richter and built in 1979–1982, commissioned by Aarhus Municipality.

The surroundings are designed by landscape architect Sven Hansen. In front of the main glass foyer is the Concert Hall Park (Musikhusparken), a sculpture and parterre garden of boxwood with flowers, fountains and small seclusive corners with benches. A recreational lawn connects the park area with the City Hall Park. Between the concert halls and the adjacent ARoS art museum is a cobblestone amphitheatre hosting outdoor events and gatherings throughout the year.

== The building complex ==
All in all, Musikhuset comprise six concert halls, nine stages and hosts more than 1,500 events every year for an audience close to half a million people. Musikhuset is built and equipped to also allow cultural experiences of a high quality for wheelchair users, the blind and people with hearing or vision impairments.

A lofty 2,000 m^{2} foyer with glass facades on three sides, leads into an anteroom and then into the main auditorium of Store Sal (Large Hall). The foyer occasionally hosts shows, concerts, exhibitions and business arrangements and can house up to 1,000 standing guest or 700 seated. It is home to café and restaurant "johan r.", named after Johan Richter, the concert halls original architect. The restaurant has a small scene of its own, arranging about 300 free concerts annually. With its fully equipped stage, the main auditorium is designed for concerts, opera, ballet and musicals, but also large assemblies and meetings are held here and has seating for nearly 1,600 people. In 2011, Danish artist Mogens Gissel redecorated it in "wine red, curry yellow, mouse grey, nut brown, azure blue and pitch black". In an expansion project in 2005–2008, another large concert hall known as Symfonisk Sal (Symphonic Hall) was added, with seating for around 1,200 people, specifically built to host symphonic orchestral music concerts. Based on the proportions of the Great Hall of the Musikverein in Vienna, the Symphonic Hall allows adjustments of the walls, carpeting and acoustic panels in order to ensure the very best delivery of symphonic music.

Musikhuset has four smaller halls, each individually built and equipped to host various genres. The smaller auditorium known as Lille Sal (Small Hall), has seating for 319 people and was originally designed for chamber music specifically. It has been updated with new technology and now also hosts theatre, rhythmic music concerts, conferences and cinema events. Rytmisk Sal (Rhythmic Hall) has seating for 465 people, but can accommodate up to 1,000 standing guests due to a changeable telescopic scene. The hall is known as the Rock 'n' Roll hall of Musikhuset, designed for rhythmic music specifically. Kammermusiksalen (The Chamber Music Hall) is constructed for chamber music, with wooden floors, light colours and a wall-sized window section for sunlight. With seating for 100 guests this hall is also used for meetings, lectures and warm-up events of various kinds. Both the Rhythmic Hall and The Chamber Music Hall are located in the new associated academy building, constructed during the 2005-2008 expansion project.

The building complex is home to Den Jyske Opera (sometimes referred to as the Danish National Opera), Aarhus Symfoniorkester (Aarhus Symphony Orchestra), Teatret Filuren (a child theatre project) and Comedy ZOO Aarhus (an organisation for Danish stand-up comedy). With passageways of glass, steel and copper, the original concert hall building connects to the adjacent Royal Academy of Music built in 2007. The academy is also in yellow brick, but includes copper and has a somewhat different architectural design overall, designed by C. F. Møller Architects. Musikhuset hosts free concerts performed by the music academy students every week.

== Events ==
The fourth edition of the Scandinavian children's song contest MGP Nordic was held at the Large Hall on November 29, 2008.

== Gallery ==
The building

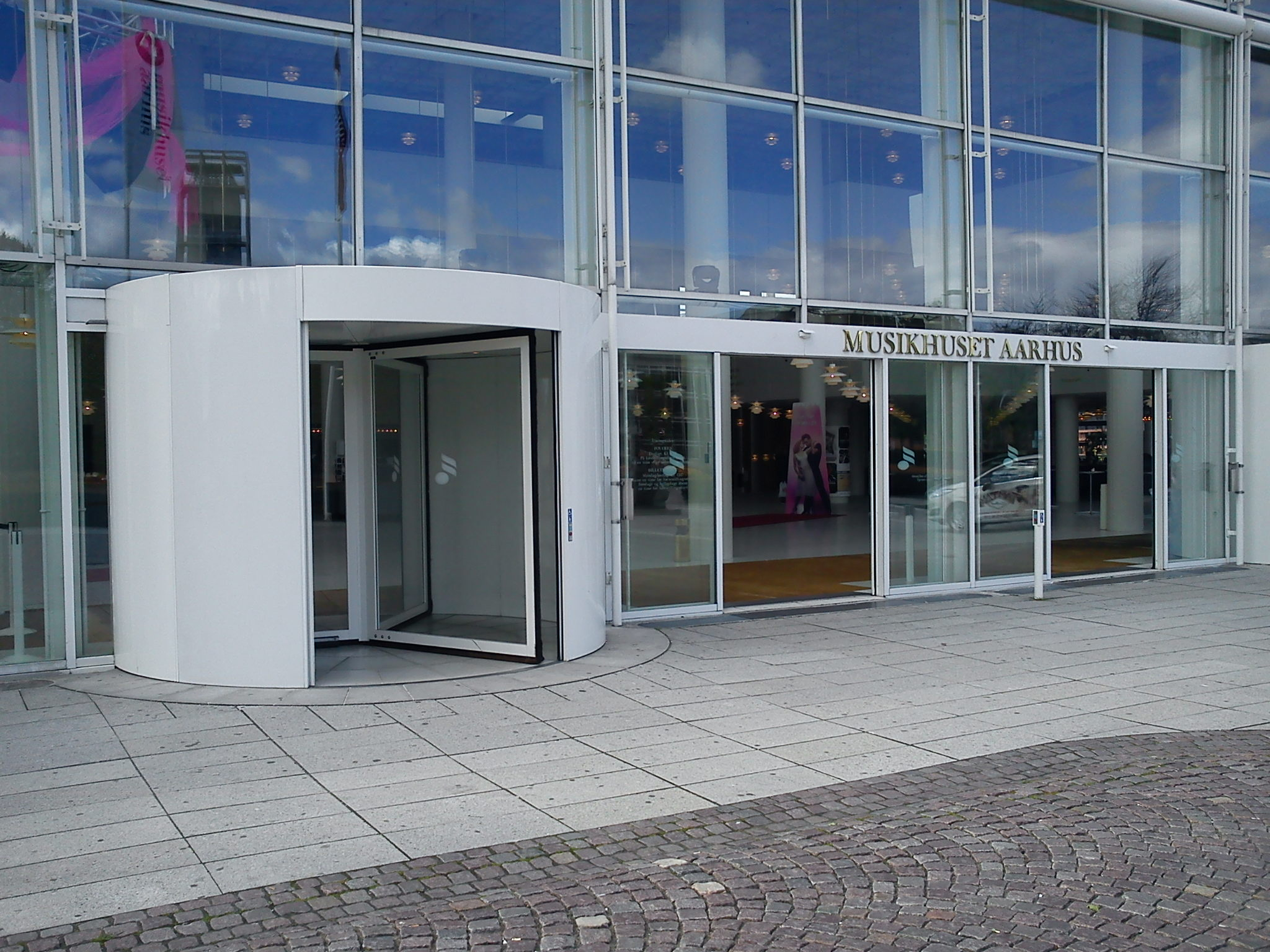
Main entrances up close.

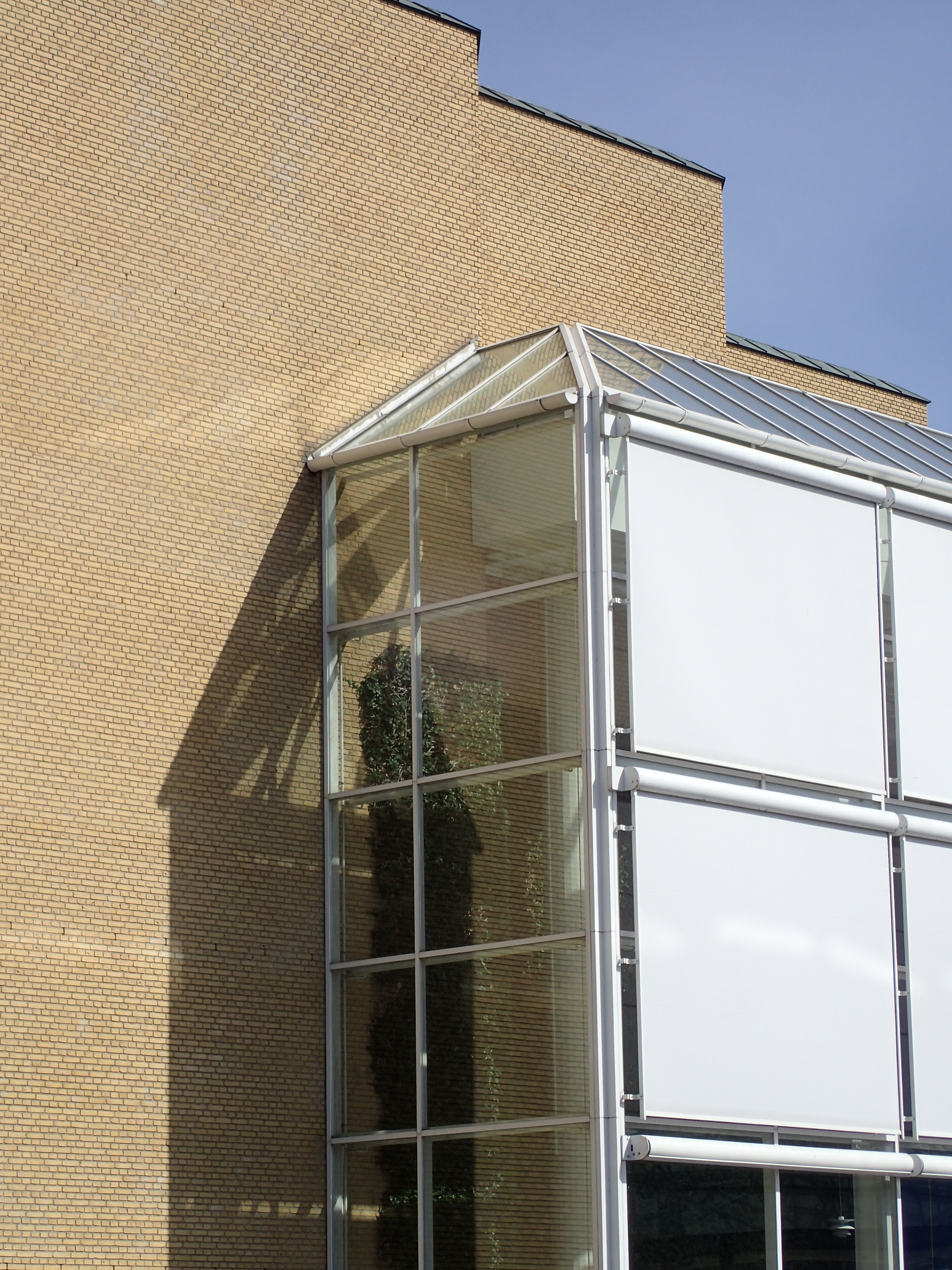
Glass and brick

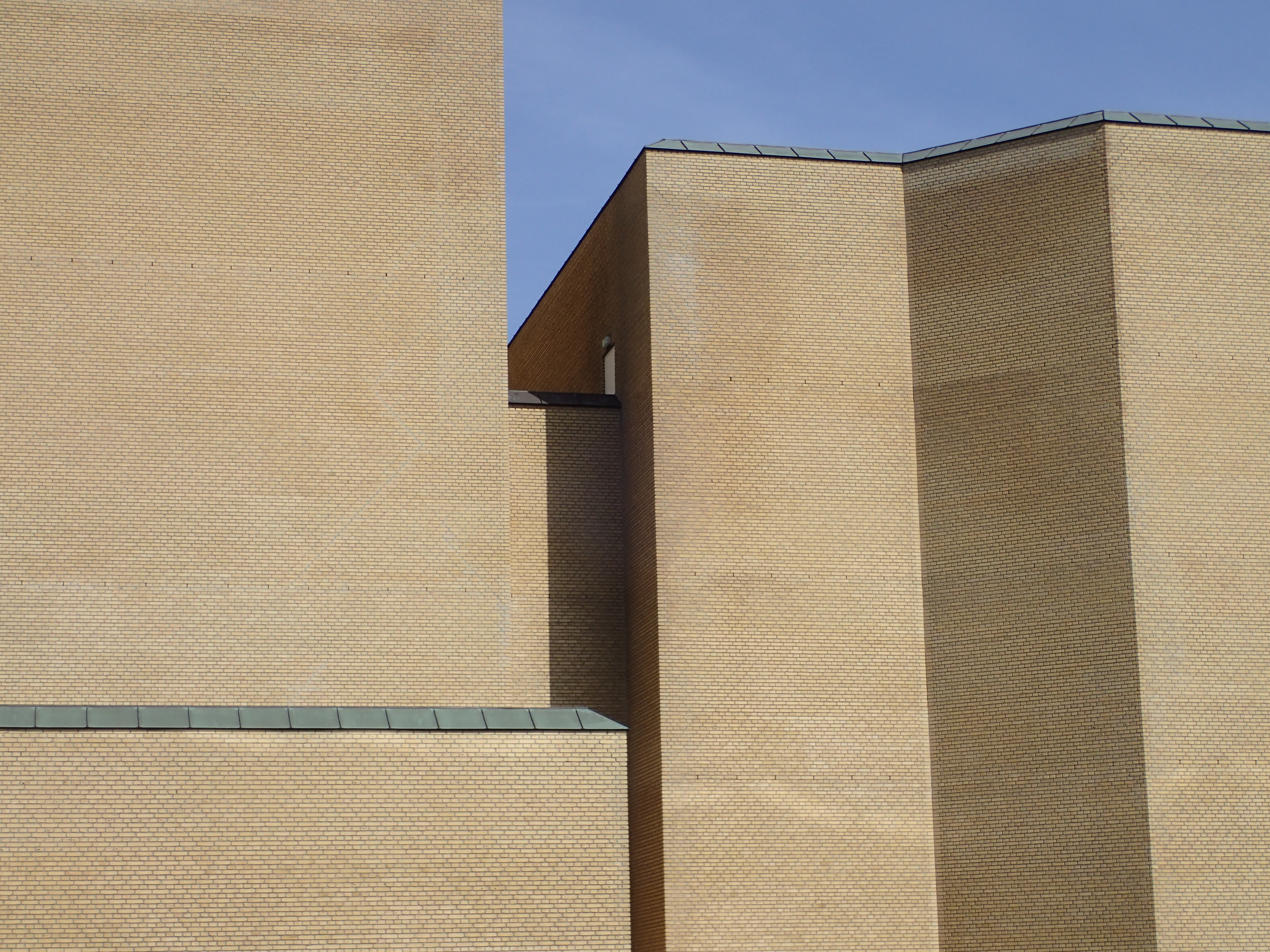
Cubist yellow brick facades lined with weathered copper plating

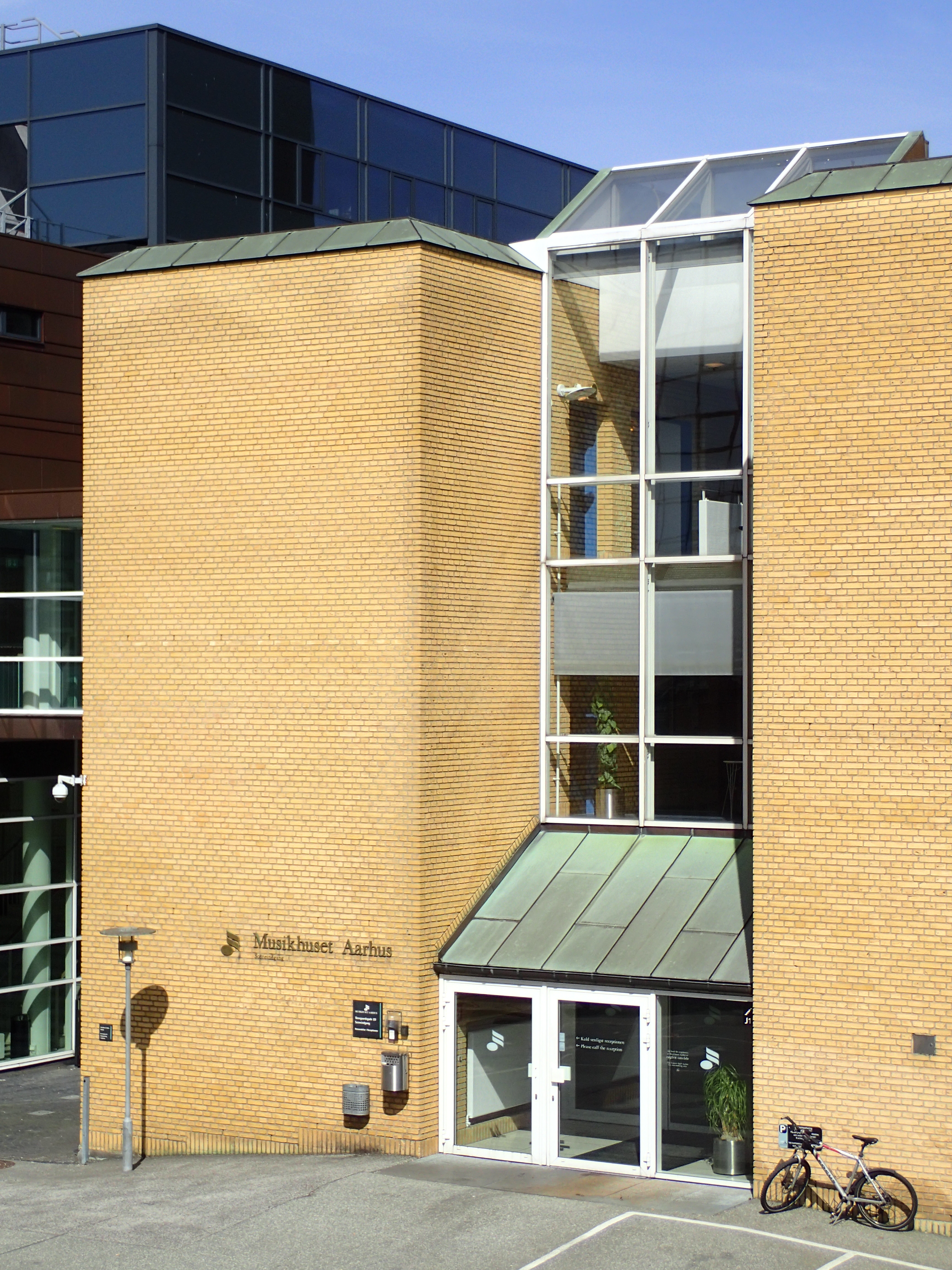
A back entry

Surroundings

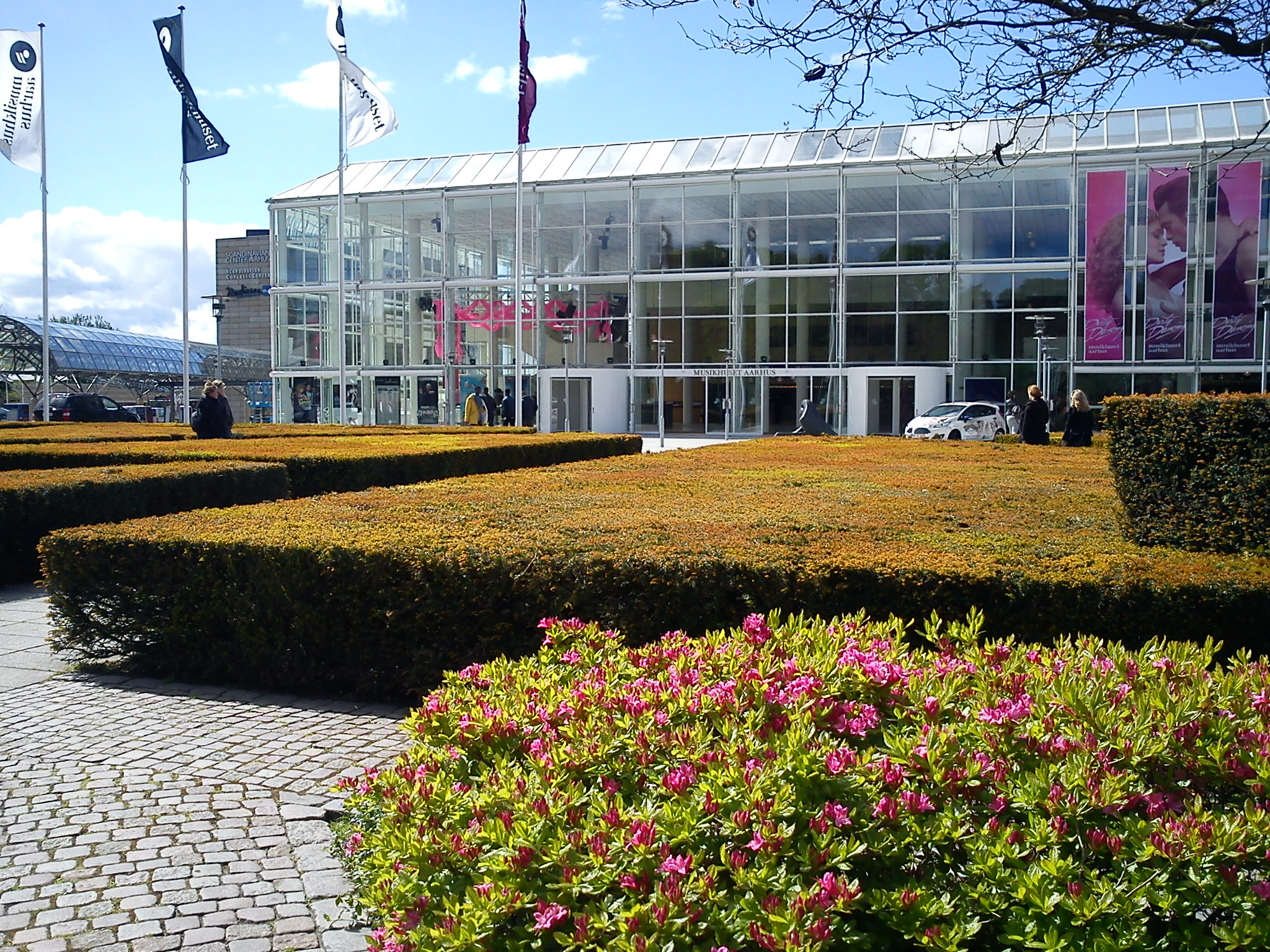
Concert Hall Park

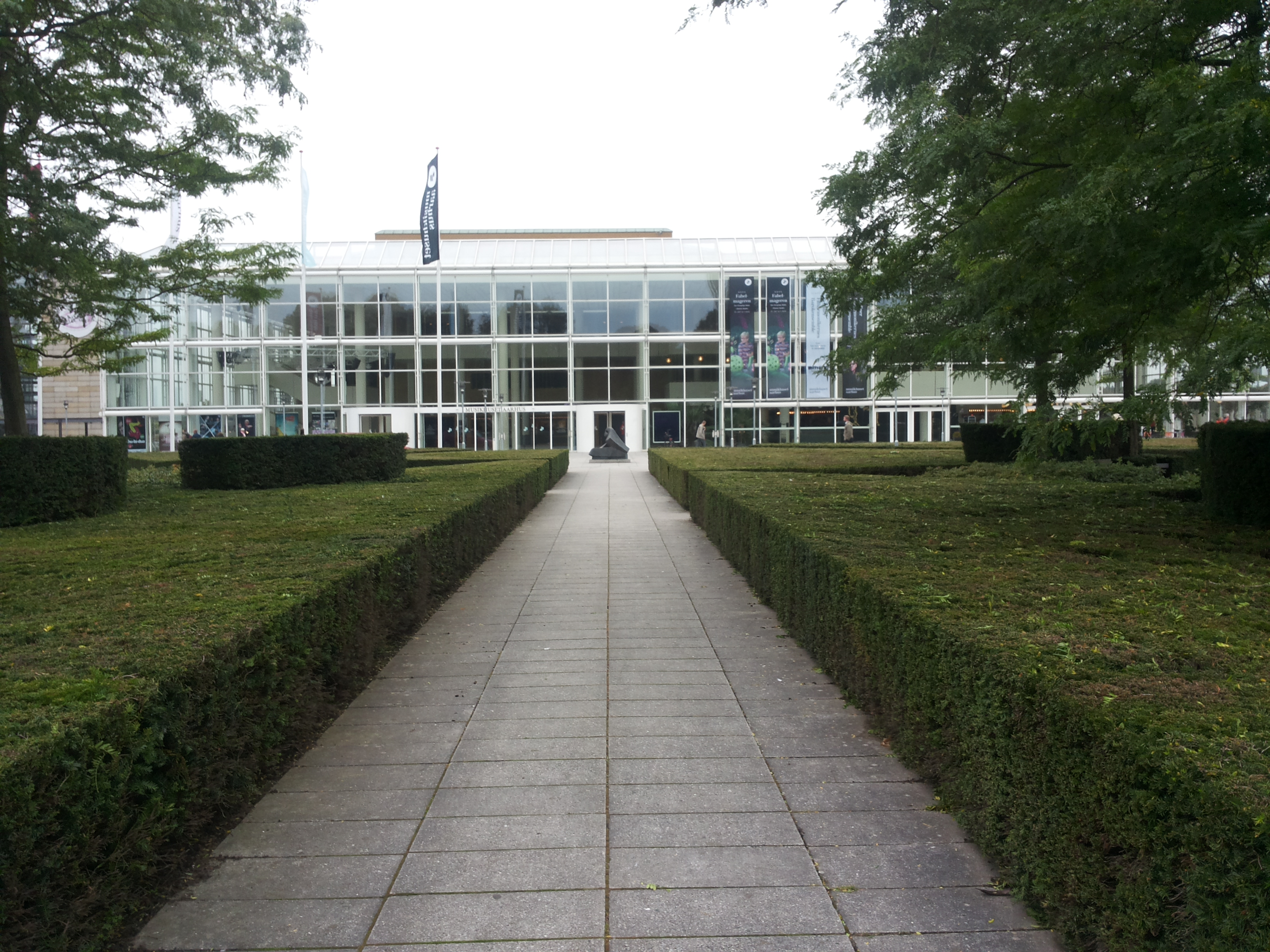
Entrypath

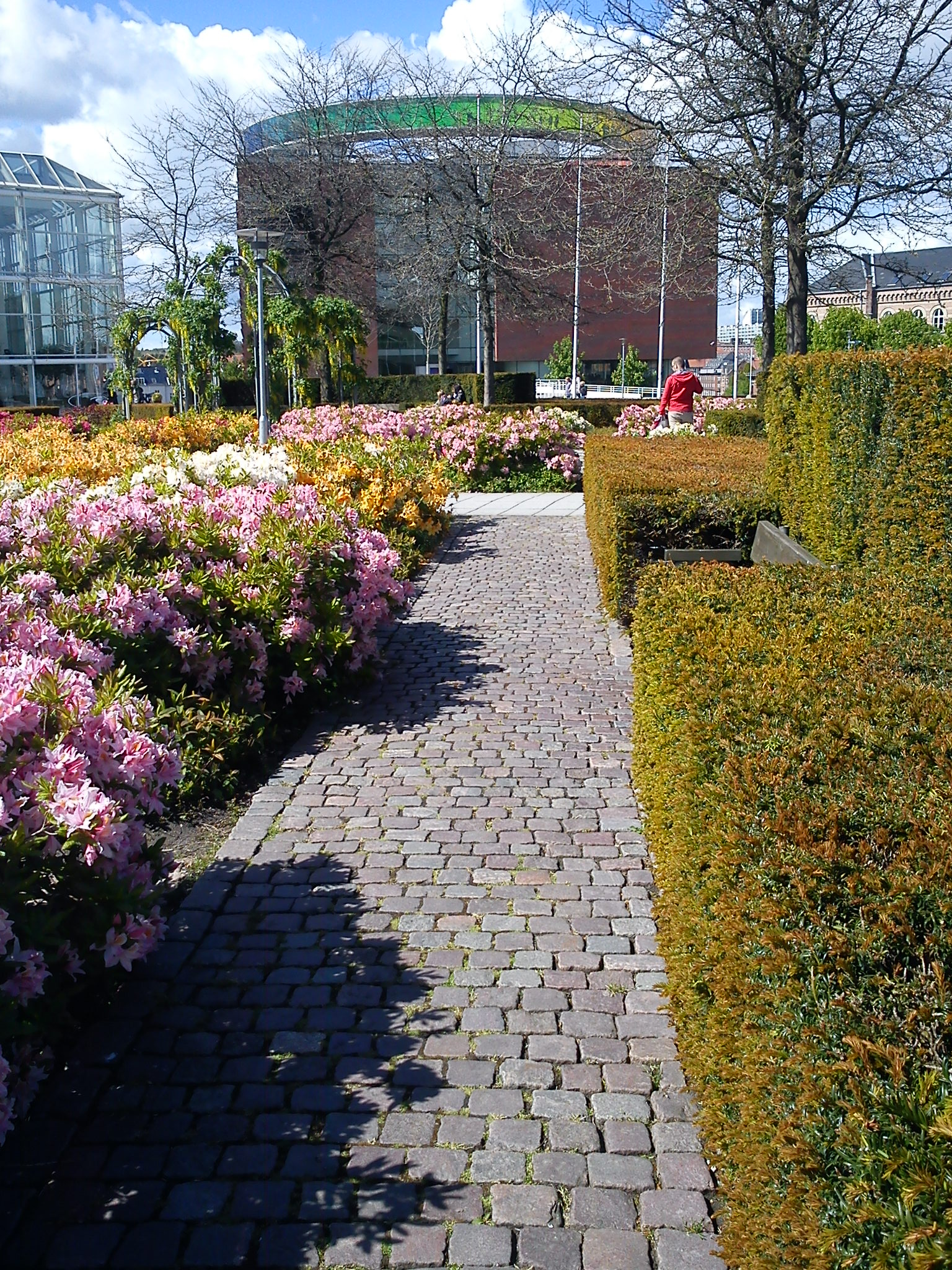
Flowers, boxwood and benches

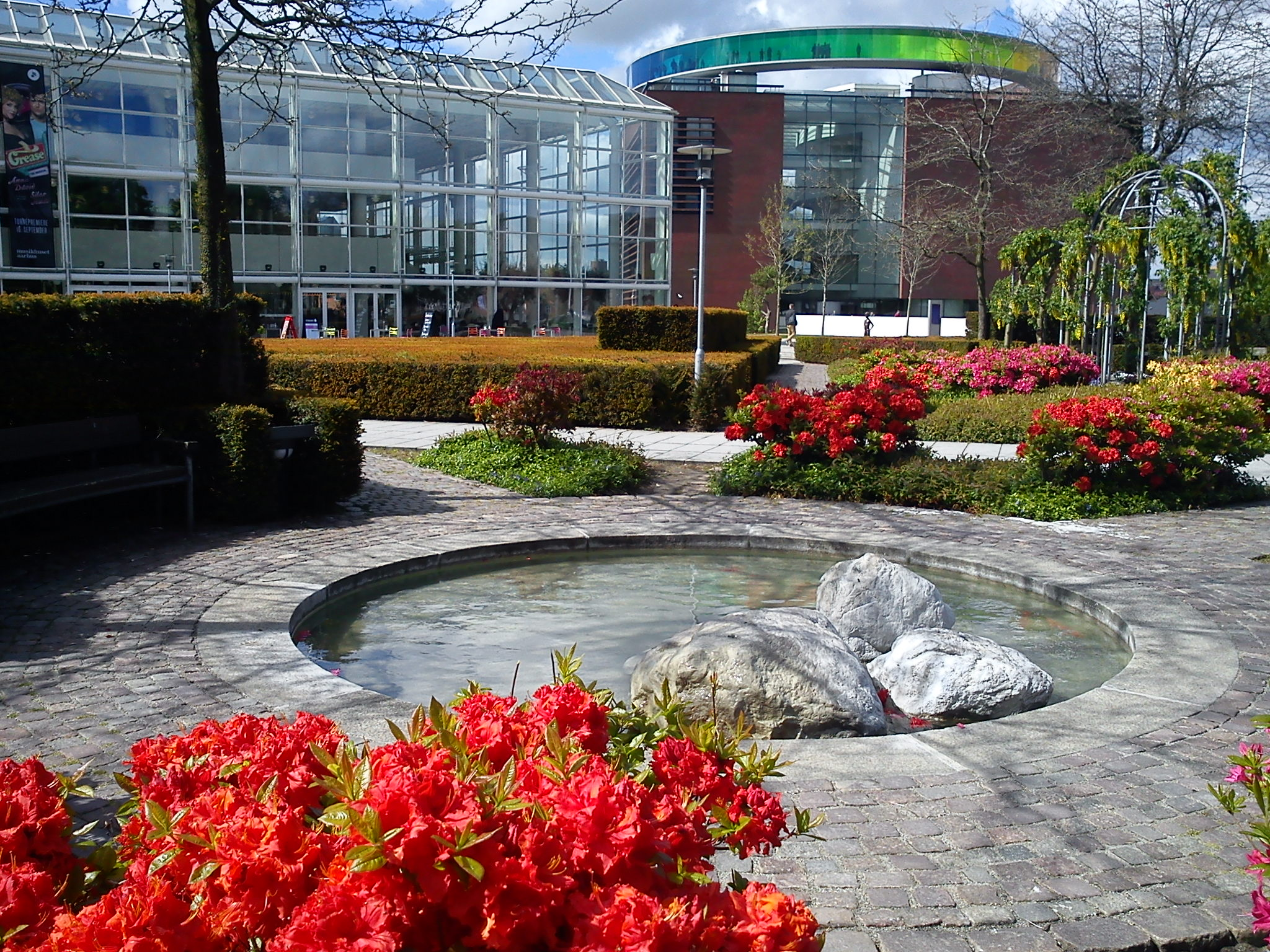
Fountains and flowers

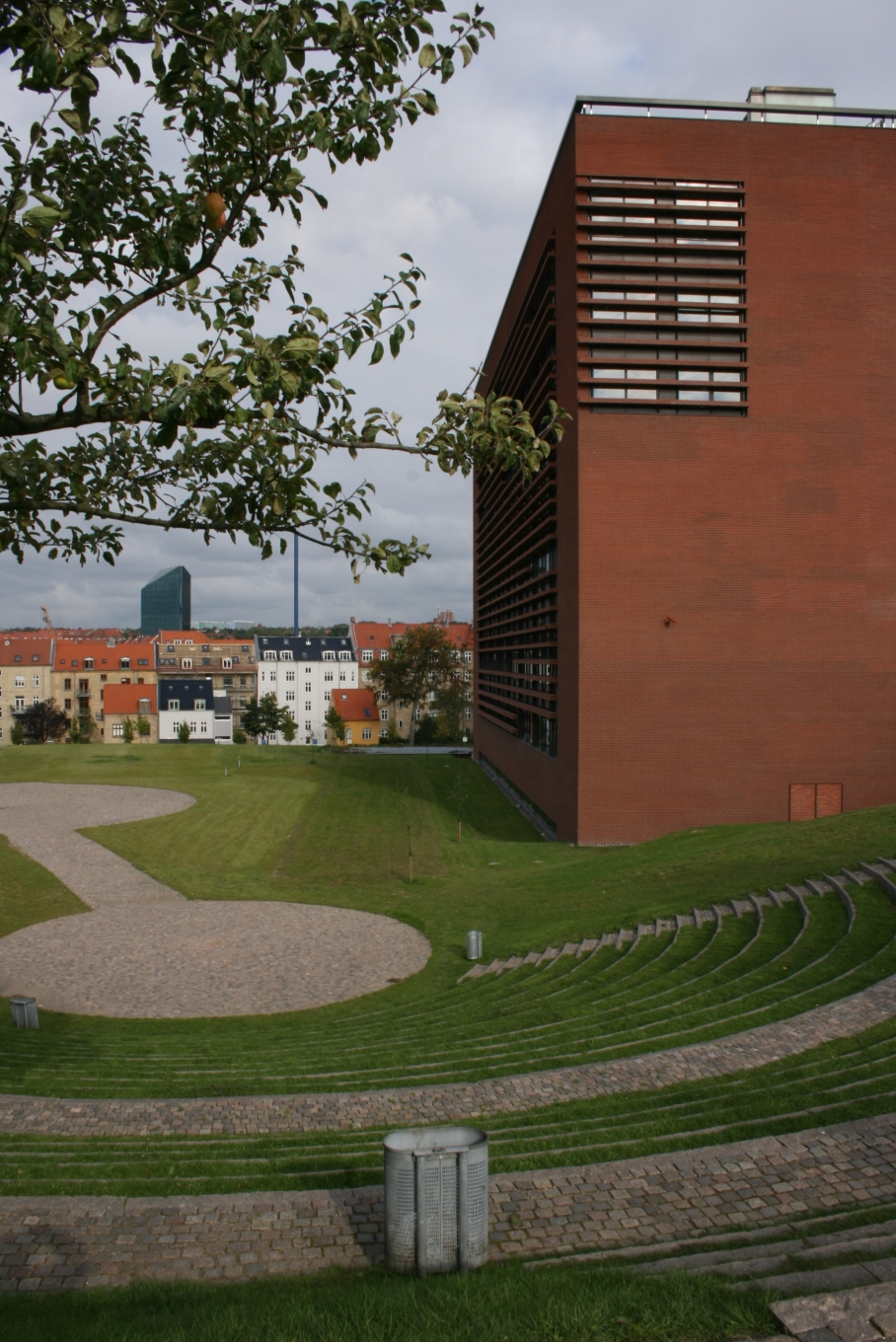
The amphitheatre.
