= Kolding Storcenter =

Shopping mall in Kolding, Denmark

Coordinates: 55°30′50.1″N 9°27′36.2″E

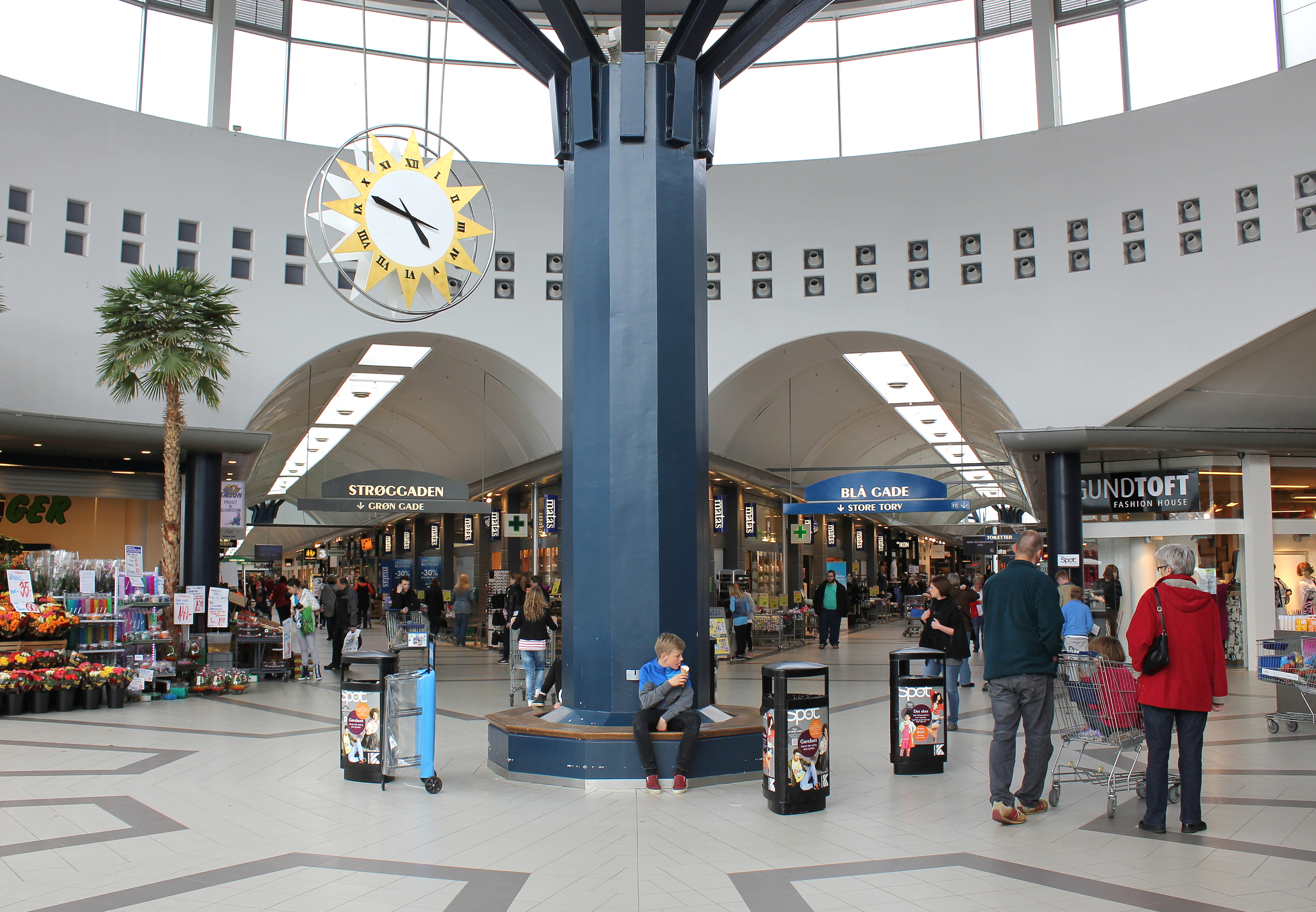
Kolding Storcenter

Kolding Storcenter is a shopping mall in the town of Kolding in Southern Denmark. It is the largest shopping mall in Jutland and one of the largest in Denmark. It covers 62.000m² and has over 120 shops and restaurants. It also has a Søstrene Grene, Bilka hypermarket and a BioCenter cinema with 6 screens.

Kolding Storcenter was built in 1993 and expanded in 1999.

It was named Denmark's best shopping mall from 2001 to 2003.

The centre, like most shopping malls in Denmark, is run by Steen & Strøm Denmark A/S.
