= Achen Pass =

Mountain pass

Achen Pass German: Achenpass
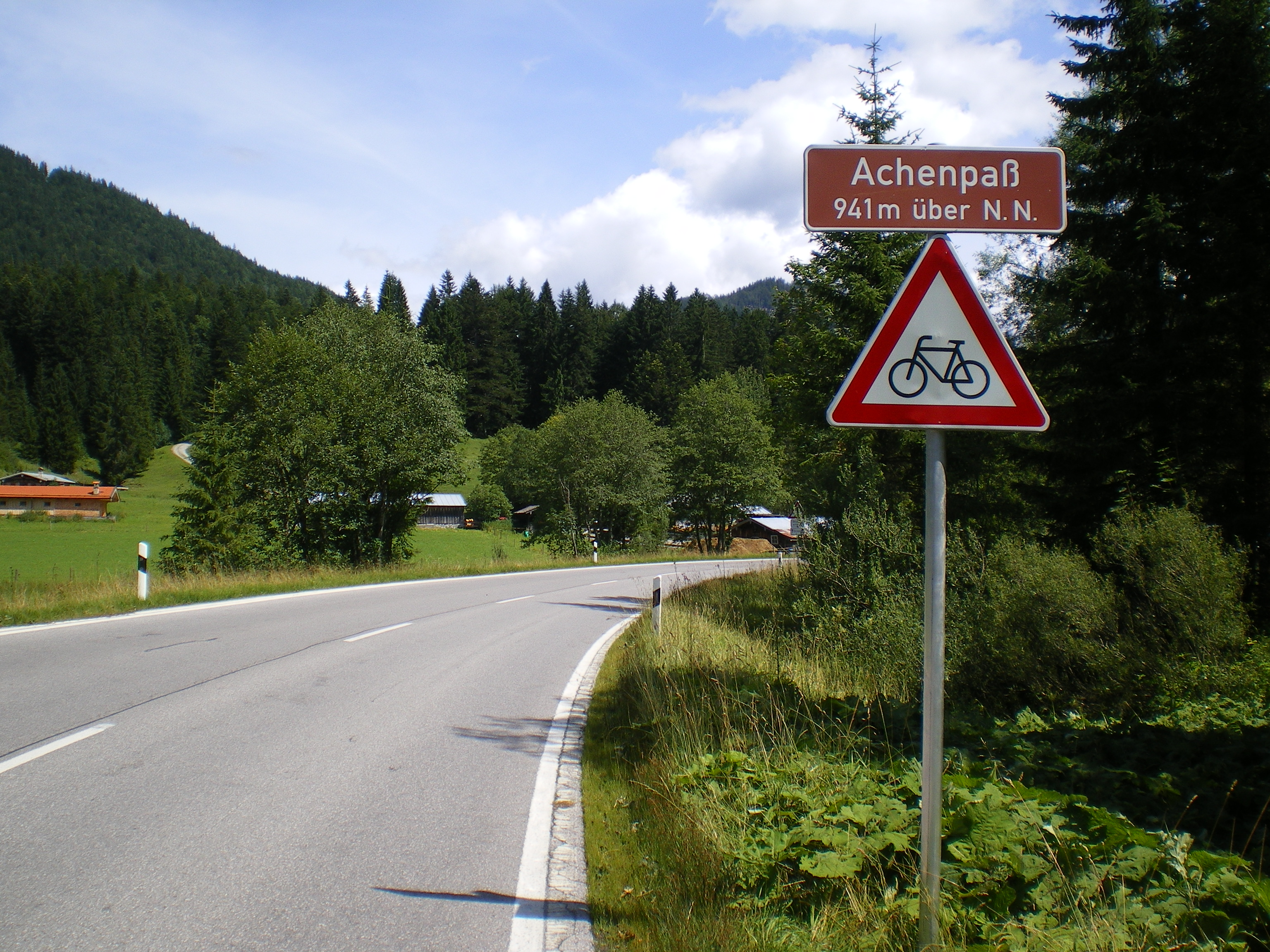
- Interactive map of Achen Pass; German: Achenpass
- Elevation: 941 metres (3,087 ft)

Third Approach
- Location: Miesbach district, Bavaria, Germany
- Range: Alps
- Coordinates: 47°36′12″N 11°38′8″E

Achen Pass (el. 941 n.) is a mountain pass in the Alps in the state of Bavaria in Germany.

The pass is located in the southwest corner of the Miesbach district, about 1 km north of the border with Austria in the south of Bavaria. It connects the valley of the Tegernsee in the north with the valley Achental in Tyrol in the south. It forms a watershed between the basins of the Weißach and the Walchen.

As early as 1495, the pass road was an important commercial route for bringing salt to Munich. It was also an important route for the Bavarian Army, which controlled Tyrol at the time of Napoleon. In the 19th century, it lost its commercial importance, but gained an important role in the tourist industry.

== See also ==
- List of highest paved roads in Europe
- List of mountain passes in Europe
