= Eggert Achen =

Danish architect (1853–1913)

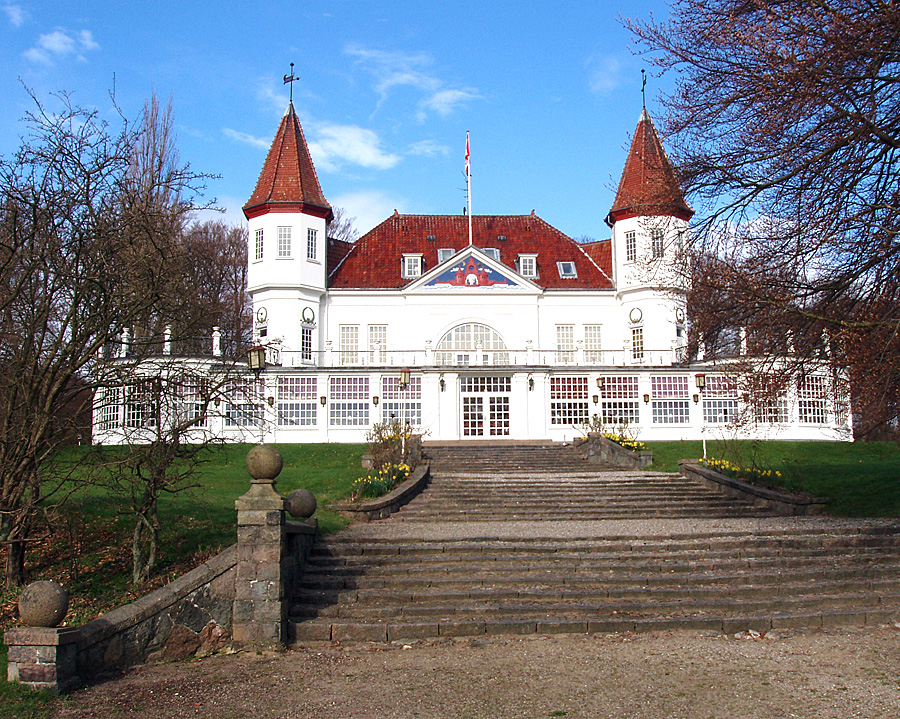
Varna Palæet

Eggert Achen (30 November 1853 – 20 December 1913) was a Danish architect.

== Biography ==
Eggert Christoffer Achen was born in the parish of Kvislemark in Næstved Municipality. Denmark. He was the son of Hillerød Eggert Christoffer Achen and Johanne Georgine Wilhelmine Cecilie Tryde. He was the brother of the painter Georg Achen (1860-1912).

He attended the Copenhagen Technical College and was admitted to the Royal Danish Academy of Fine Arts in January 1872. Around 1877, Achen settled in Randers.

Chairman of the Architects' Association of Denmark between 1910 and 1914, he was a Freemason and member of the Danish Masonic Order. He designed several lodges for the Freemasons including one in Randers in 1881, together with Frits Uldall, and in Aarhus in 1908. He collaborated frequently with the Aarhus architect Thorkel Møller, mainly in Central and South Jutland in the restorations of manors and hotel conversions. Varna Palæet, a restaurant, and the Technical School in Hobro can also be counted amongst his works. Achen moved to Aarhus ca. 1895 where he died in 1913.

== See also ==
- List of Danish architects
