= Rådhusparken =

Public park in Aarhus, Denmark

Coordinates: 56.151735°N 10.201824°E

- Rådhusparken
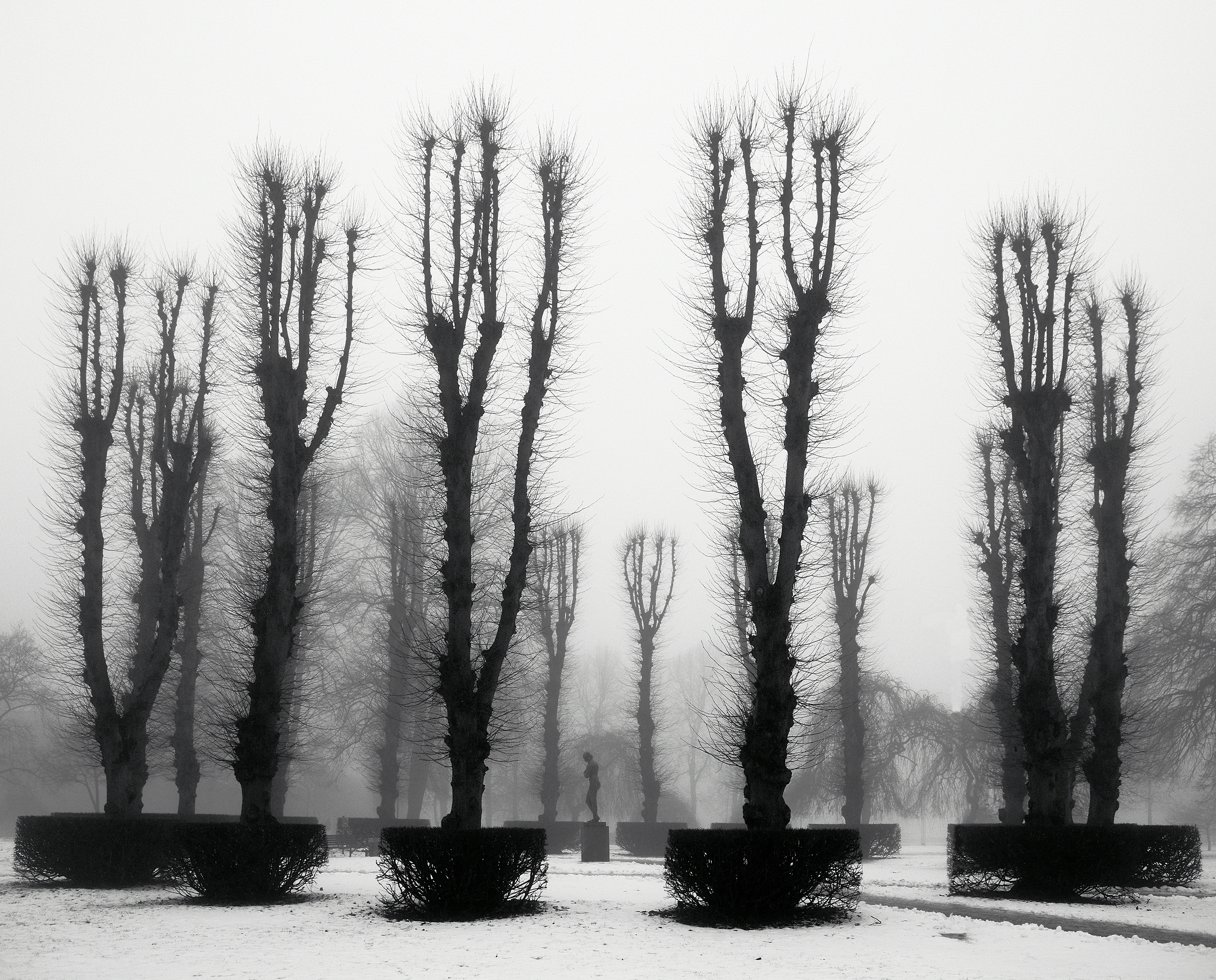
- Interactive map of Rådhusparken
- Type: Urban park
- Location: Aarhus, Denmark
- Area: 9,000 m2
- Created: 1941
- Owner: Aarhus Municipality

Rådhusparken (lit. The City Hall Park) is a public park in central Aarhus, Denmark. The park is situated by the City Hall in the Indre By neighborhood of Midtbyen, between the streets Frederiks Allé to the west and Park Allé to the east. The park lies within a scenic semi-circle of some of the more important cultural and political institutions in the city; the Concert Hall, the ARoS Art Museum, Vester Allés Kaserne and the city hall. The City Hall Park was listed along with the adjacent city hall on 10 March 1995.

== Outline ==
The park is characterized by a large entry section in the southeast, towards the central station; the main entrance of the city. This section consists of a small plaza with a broad cobbled staircase and tunnel with a cobblestoned linden tree avenue, leading through the park, all the way to the city hall square. There are other pathways in the park, one of which leads to a paved rotunda of tall pollarded linden trees in the park center.

The majority of the City Hall Park comprise an open lawn with large old trees scattered throughout, primarily south beech and magnolia. Apart from the grass, the lawn is also planted with several species of flowers, including crocus and daffodils, each flowering at separate times to keep the park more interesting throughout the year. Next to the city hall building in the east, there is a small secluded garden area with benches. The garden is lined with rhododendron and consists of flowerbeds of perennial plants and scallions. The ideal of the garden is the forest and leaves, and flowers are with a few exceptions kept in the colors of green, white and yellow.

The trafficated road of Frederiks Allé separates the City Hall Park from the adjacent newer Concert Hall Park (Musikhusparken).

== Sculptures ==
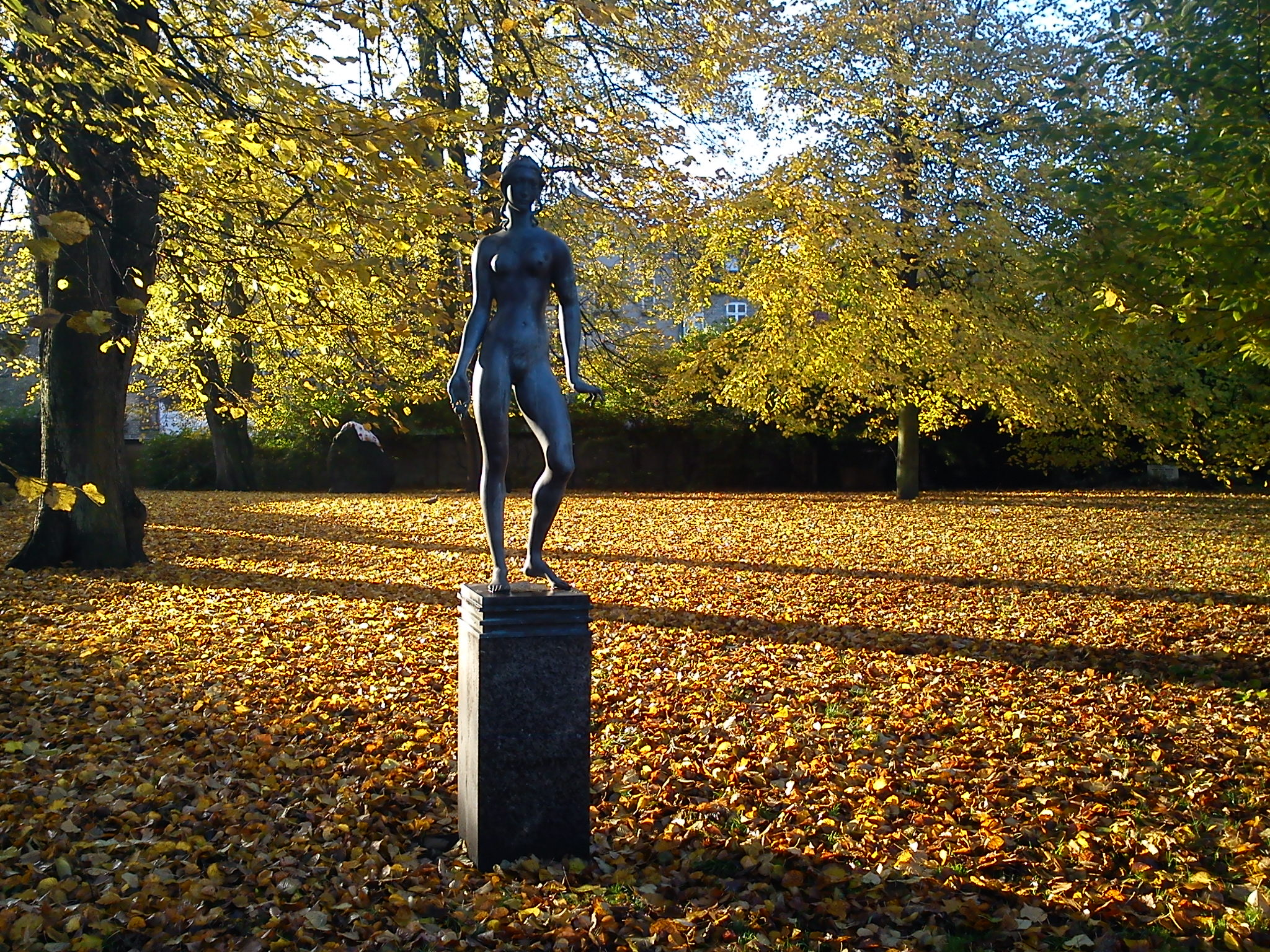
Sculptures adorn the City Hall Park.

The City Hall Park has four sculptures, all of women figures; Pigen af 1940 (Girl of 1940), Vågnende Kvinde (Waking Woman), Den Svangre (The Fated) and Atalante (Atalanta).

"The Fated" was produced by sculptor Johannes C. Bjerg in black, finely sanded, granite from Bornholm. It stands in the center of the tree rotunda where it was placed on 26 May 1955 after it was donated to the city. "Waking Woman" is a bronze sculpture modelled by Kai Nielsen in 1920, depicting a young women waking from a sleep, or alternatively, symbolizing the woman waking in the girl. The statue originally stood in front of Atletion but after a fire in 1943 it was moved and placed here in the park in 1948. "Girl of 1940" is a life-size bronze sculpture made by Svend Rathsack and placed in the park by Aarhus Municipality in 1941. The aerial bombardments during the Second World War inspired the statue, depicting a young woman defensively holding her arms above herself. "Atalanta", another bronze sculpture, depicts Atalanta from Greek mythology and is placed in the southern section of the park. It was made by sculptor and professor Einar Utzon-Frank in 1919.

== History ==
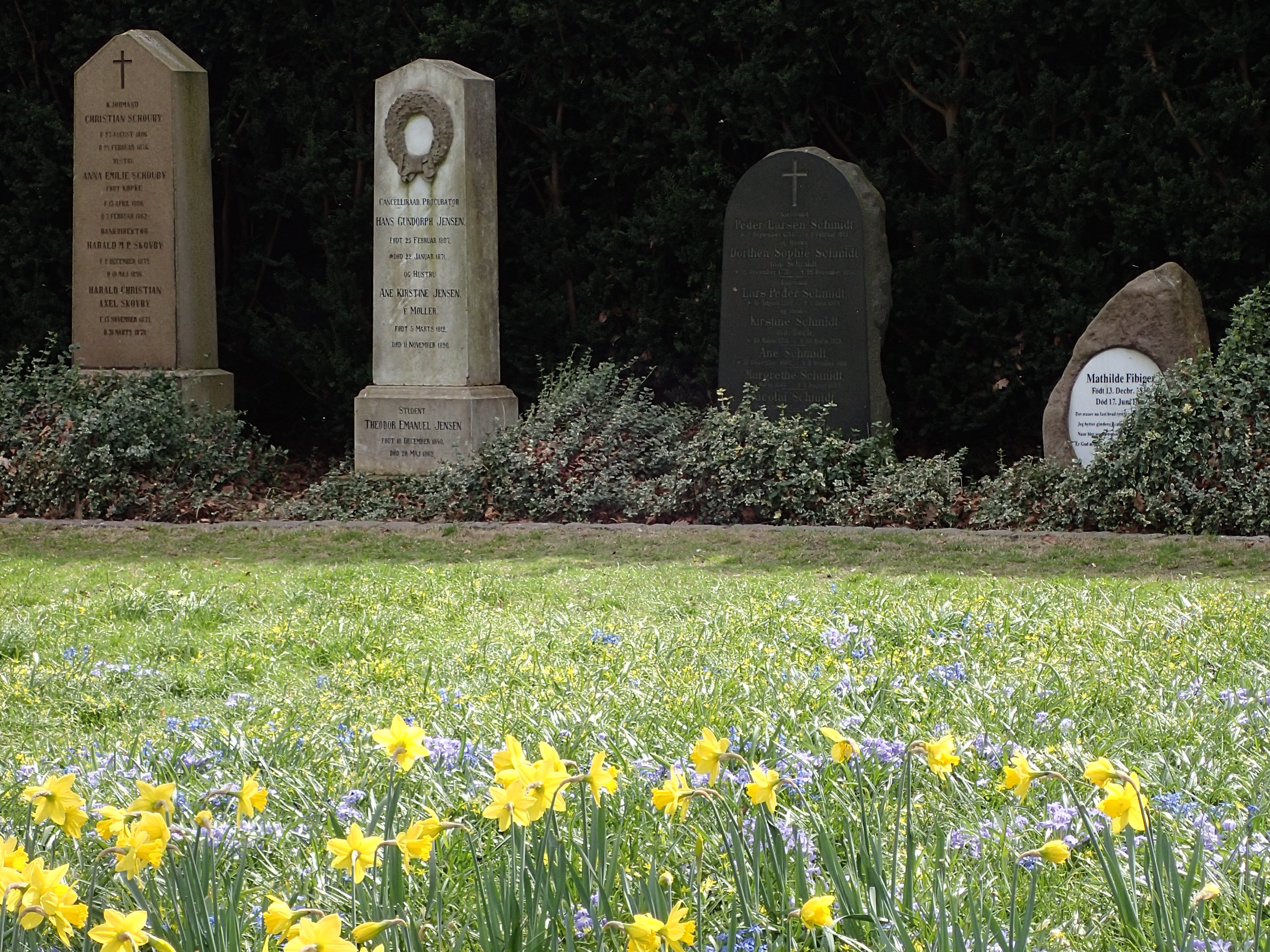
Remnants of the former Søndre Kirkegård cemetery

The area of the City Hall Park was previously the cemetery Søndre Kirkegård, since 1818. The park was established in connection with the construction of the city hall in 1941 but already in 1912 the city council had made the decision to redevelop the cemetery into a recreational area within 25 years. The selling of graves was suspended with the last burial taking place in 1926. The later decision to build a new city hall meant that only part of the cemetery could be turned into a park but the architects ultimately made the park a part of their overall plans.

The linden-rotunda is placed where the former cemetery chapel stood. The southern park section bordering the Scandic Plaza Hotel, used to have two partially covered bomb shelters, constructed during the Second World War. The area functioned as a playground for children in the neighborhood, through the 50s and 60s. The park itself, was originally a closed area forbidden for use by the public, with uniformed guards to enforce the rules. In 1995, the park was listed along with the city hall, but in 1999, the garden was redeveloped and all lower-growth plants replaced, although the overall shape and path-structure remains as they were originally in the 1940s. In 2008-2009, the park was again renewed and the playground was removed in favor of more open spaces.

== Lapidarium ==
The former cemetery still has a presence in the park, as some headstones has been preserved for historical and aesthetic reasons. 35 of the original stones has been kept, but all have been relocated to a wall along the far southern end.

The original 35 stones

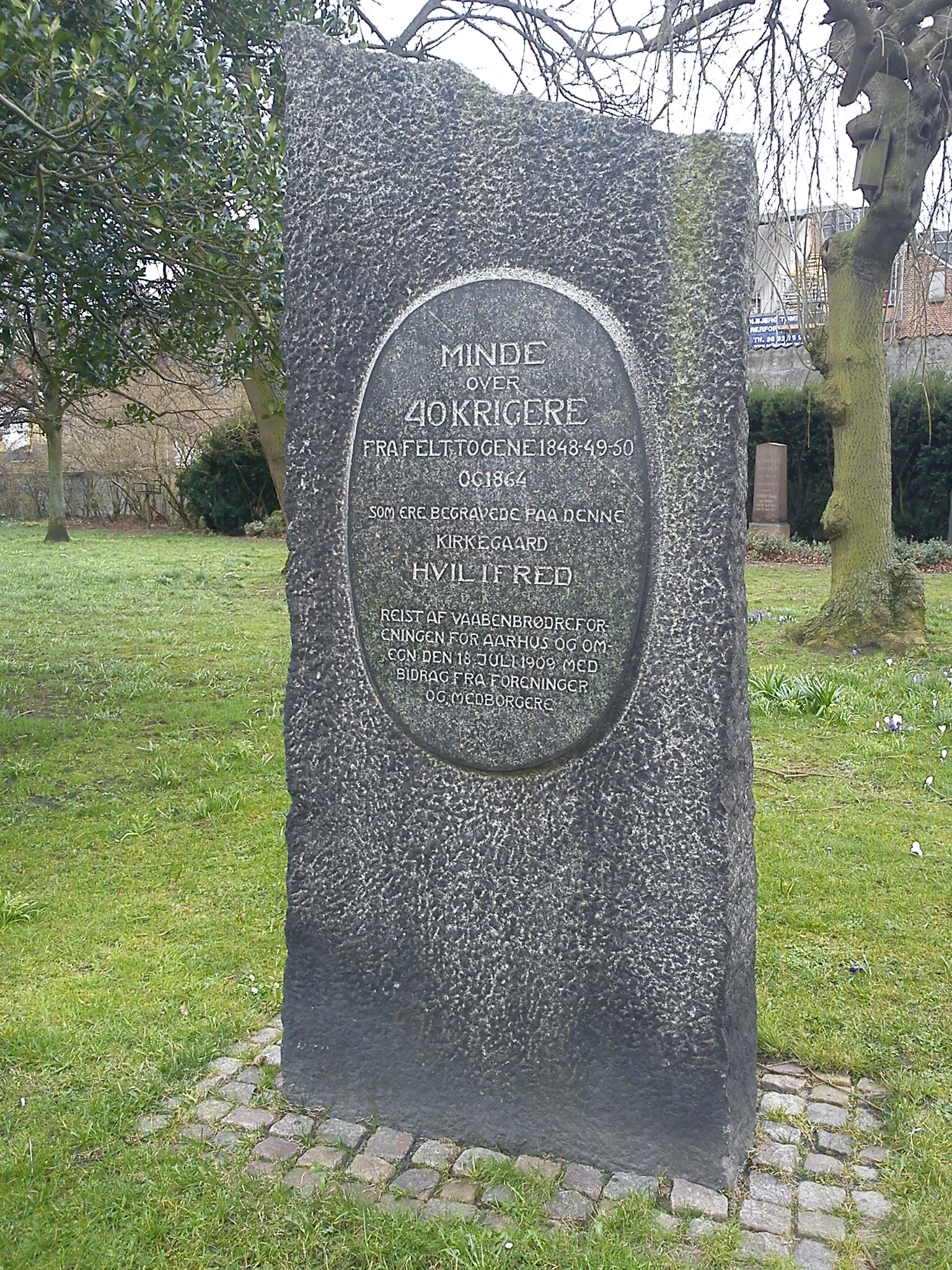
Memorial for 40 dead Danish soldiers in the First and Second Schleswig War.

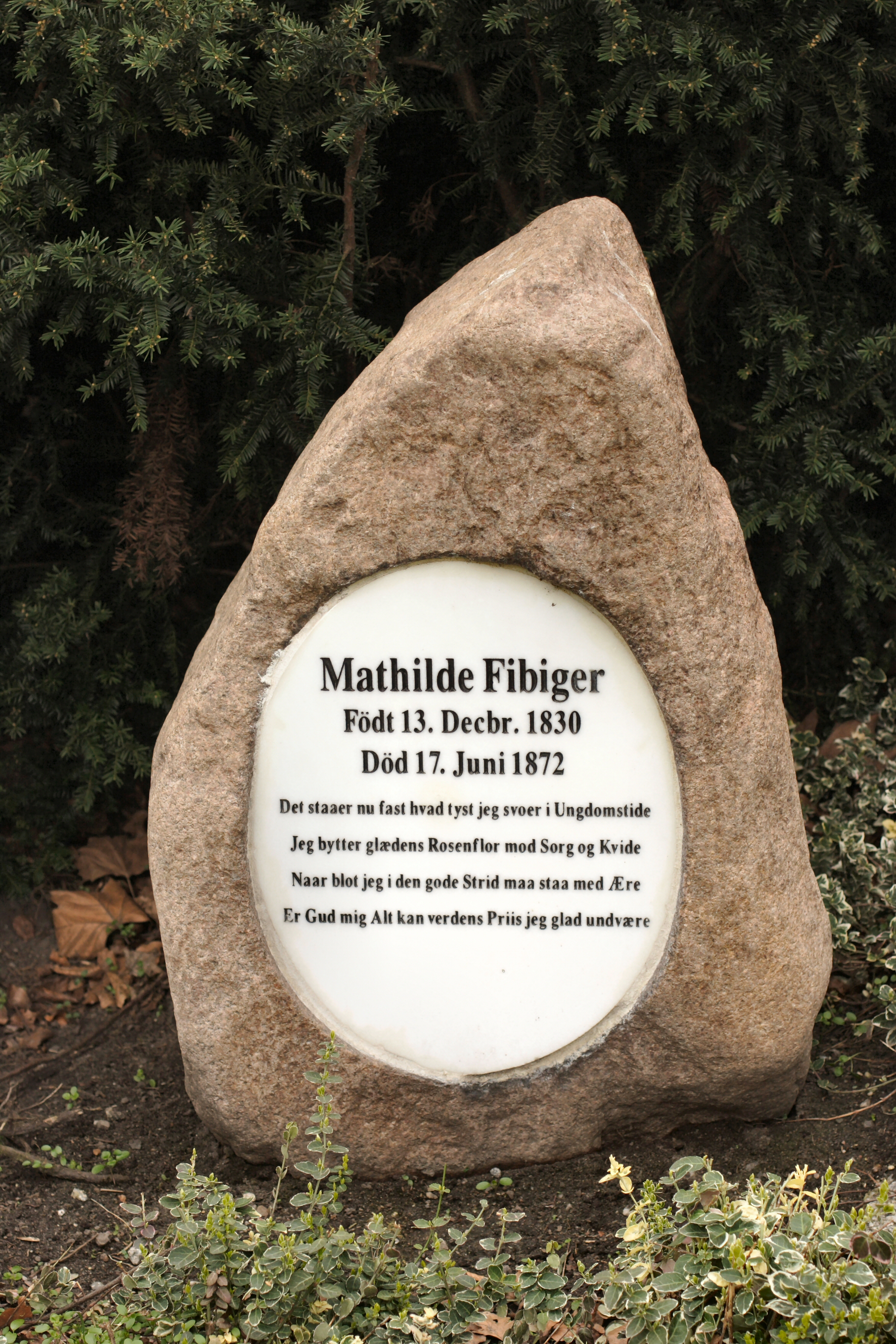
Headstone for Mathilde Fibirger.

| 1 | Title | Name | Notes |
| 1 | Bishop | Peter Hans Mønster | |
| 2 | Book binder | Adolph Theodor Svendsen | |
| 3 | Merchant | Harboe Meulengracht | |
| 4 | Merchant | Rasmus Nielsen Malling | |
| 5 | | Anne Kirstine Mørch | |
| 6 | Merchant | Johan Frederik Kuur | |
| 7 | Oil miller | Christian Bang | |
| 8 | Painter | Christian David Gebauer | Held in The Old Town |
| 9 | Birch judge | Christen Rasmussen | |
| 10 | Proprietor | Otto August la Cour | |
| 11 | | Koch | Family grave, removed in 1949 due to disintegrating marble |
| 12 | General major | Frederik Gotthold v. Müller | |
| 13 | Merchant | Søren Jensen Søegaard | |
| 14 | Chancellery council | Otto Henrik Nors | |
| 15 | Merchant | Christian Skovby | |
| 16 | Chancellery council | Hans Gundorph Jensen | |
| 17 | Merchant | Peder Larsen Schmidt | |
| 18 | | Mathilde Fibiger | |
| 19 | General lieutenant | Johan Johnsen Honnes | |
| 20 | Merchant | Christian Albert Bünger | |
| 21 | Premier lieutenant | Frederik Wilhelm Meulengracht | |
| 22 | Tanner | Carl Flach | |
| 23 | Merchant | Malthe Conrad Lottrup | |
| 24 | Bishop | Jens Paludan-Müller | |
| 25 | | Adolph Frederik Elmquist | |
| 26 | Merchant | Lars Ammitsbøll Marcussen | |
| 27 | Tanner | Christian Frederik Wissing | |
| 28 | Senior teacher | Harald Regnar Nielsen | |
| 29 | Bailiff | Jørgen Nielsen | |
| 30 | Organist | Johannes Kabell | |
| 31 | Merchant | Peder Funder | Held in The Old Town |
| 32 | Skipper | John Gaarn | |
| 33 | Colonel | Julius Høegh-Guldberg | Family grave for the Høegh-Guldberg family |
| 34 | Bank president | Jens Christian Seidelin | |

The 35th stone is for 40 soldiers that fell during the First and Second Schleswig War with Germany in 1848-1850 and 1864.

== Gallery ==
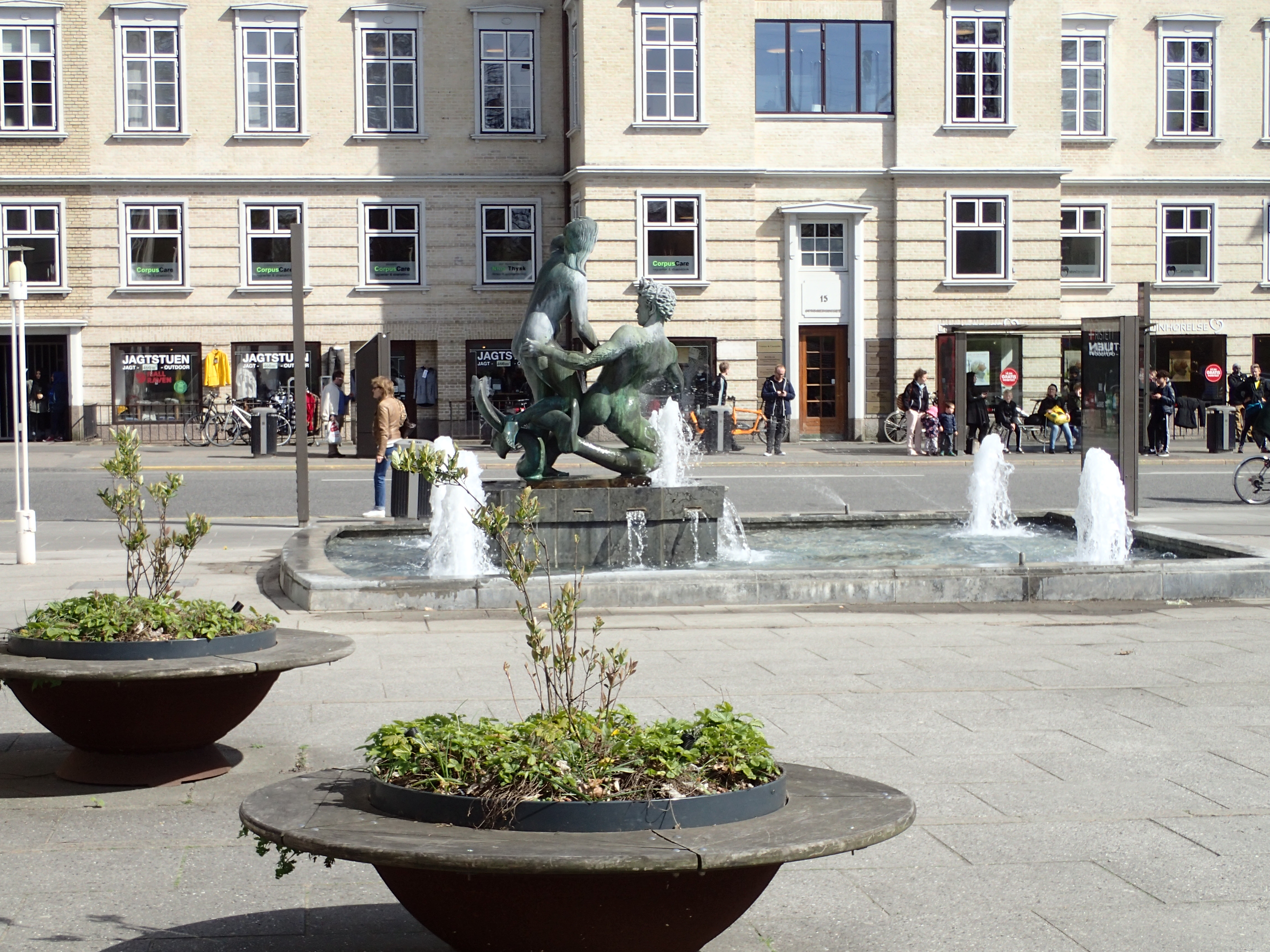
Byporten town plaza

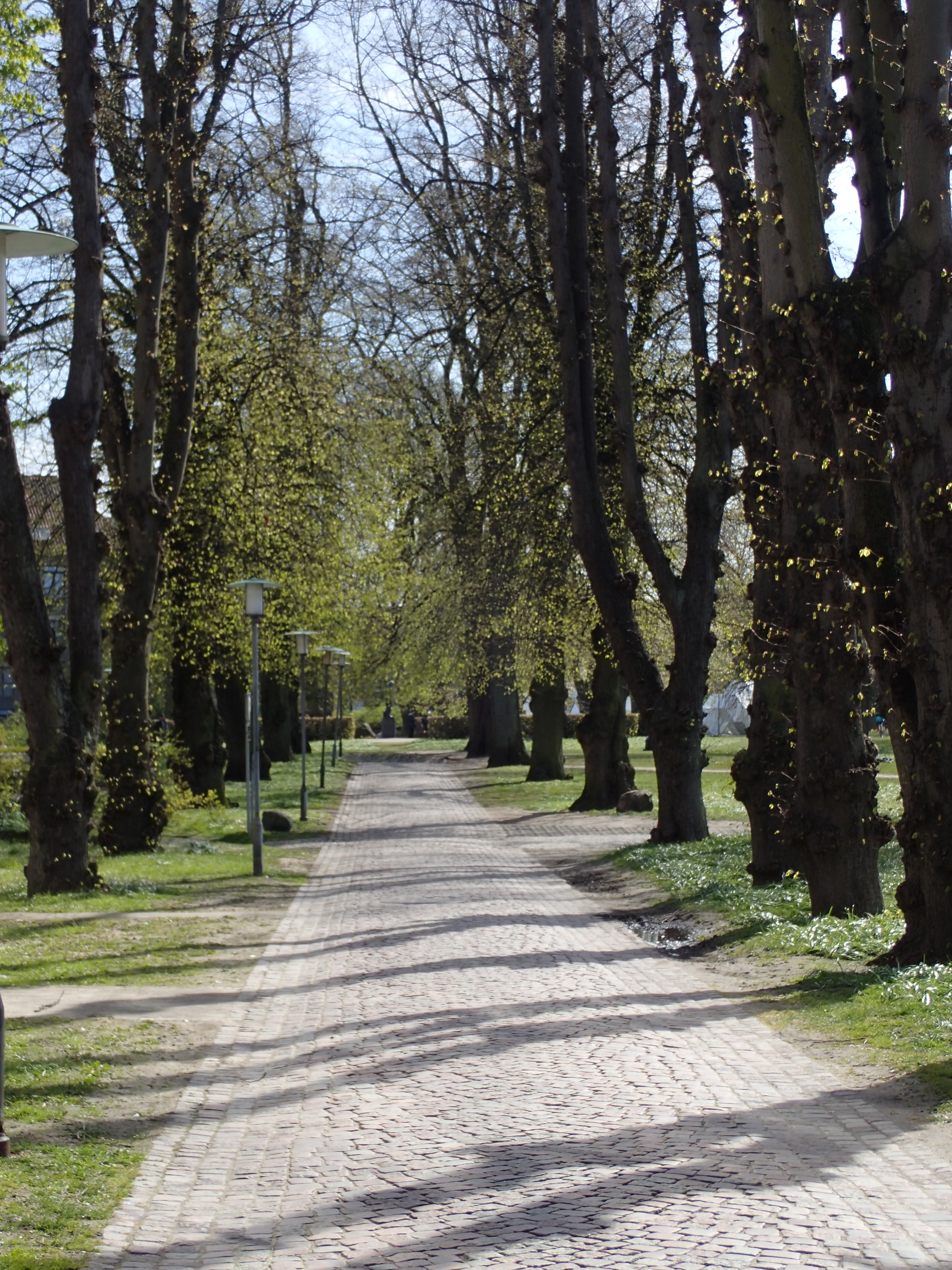
Linden tree avenue

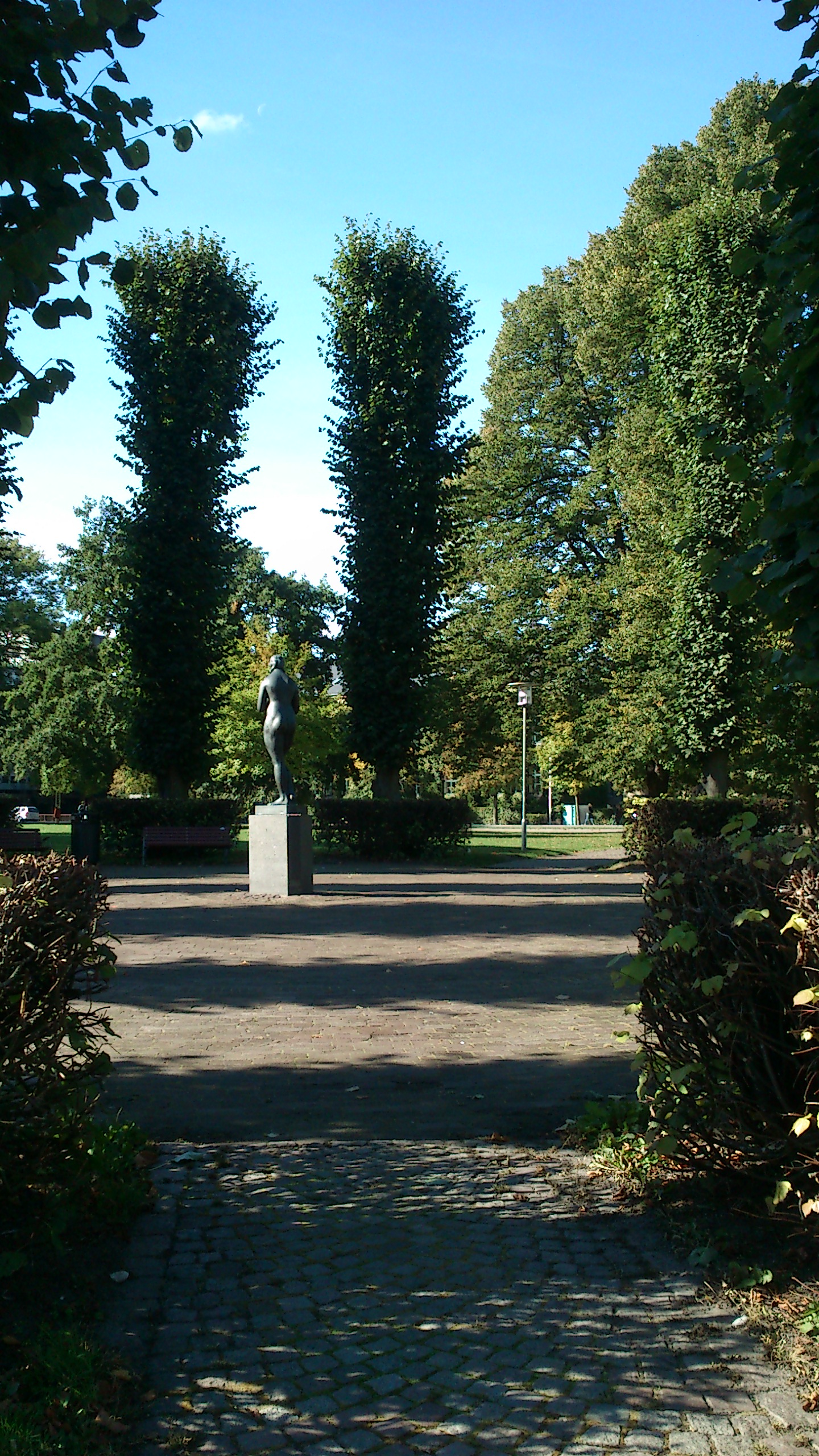
The paved rotunda

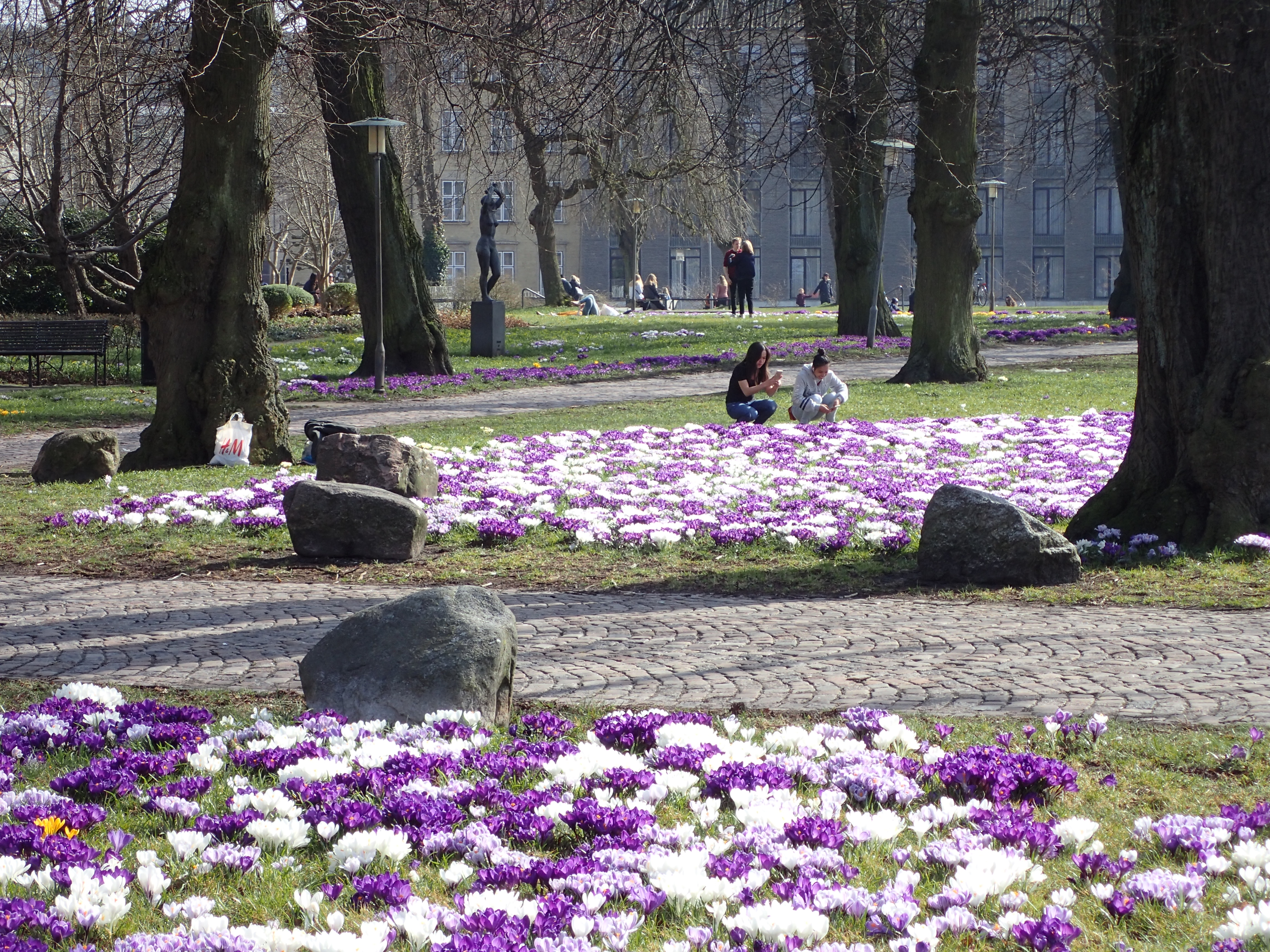
Crocus in early spring (usually March)

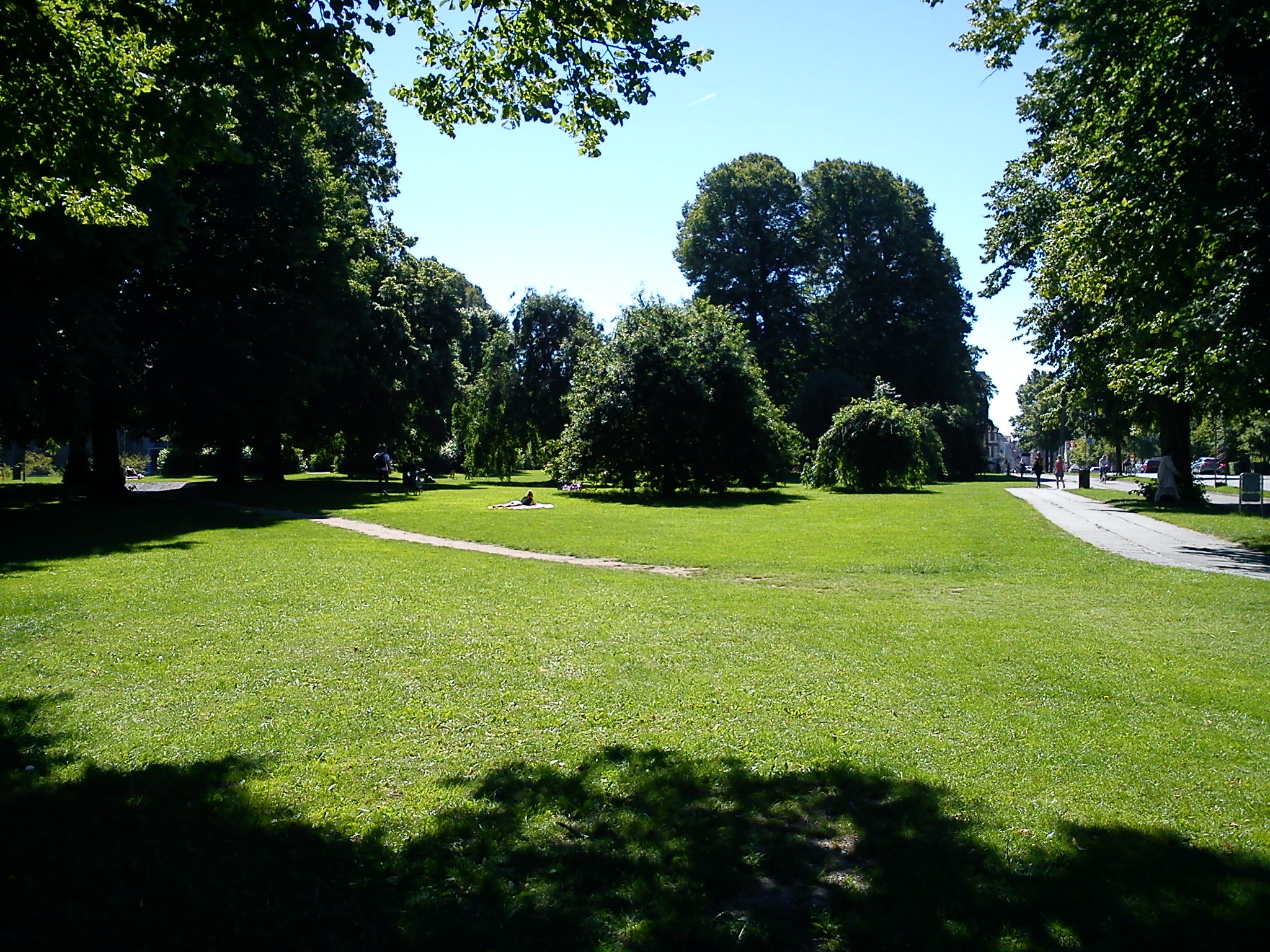
The lawn

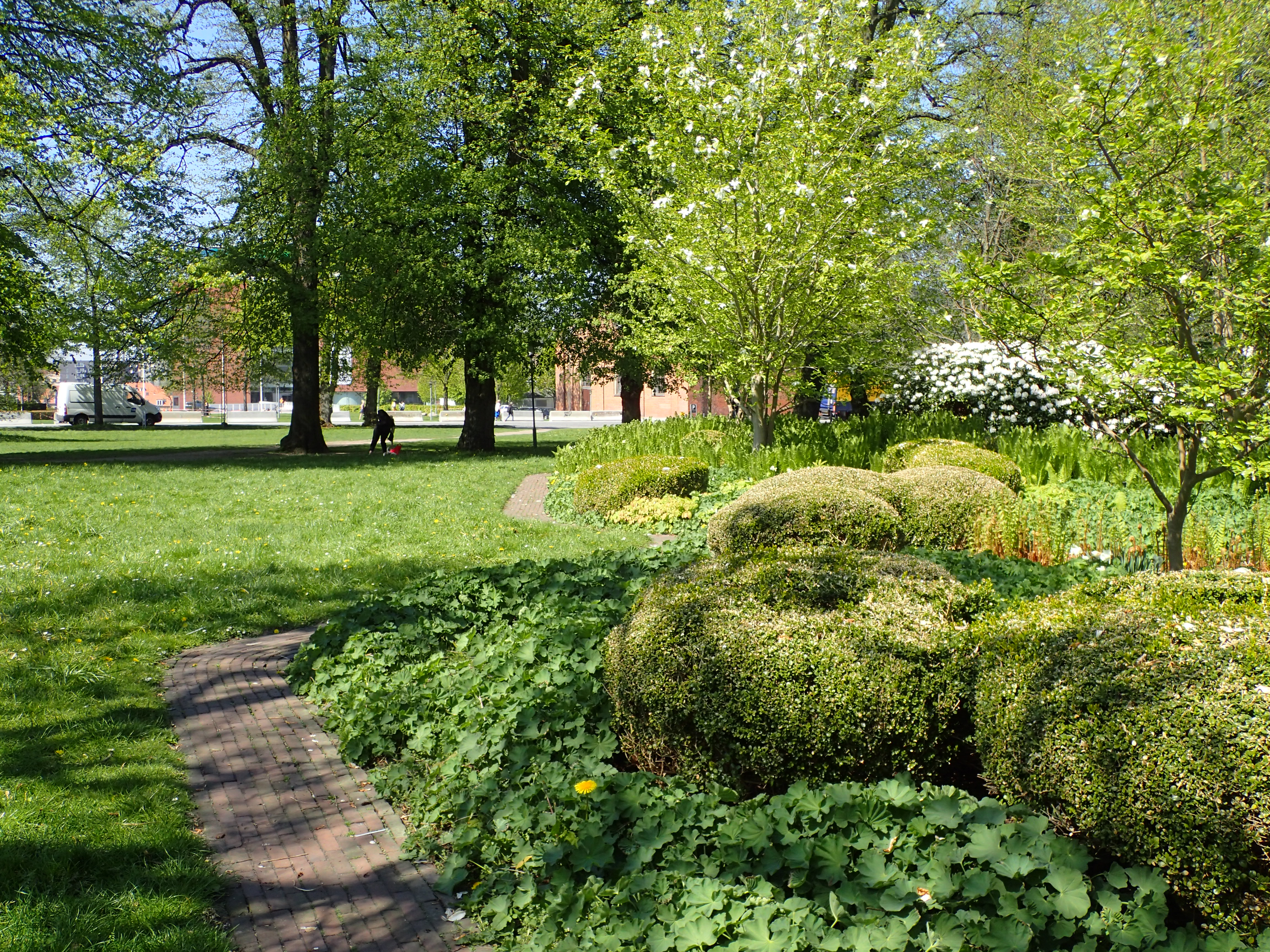
Secluded garden area

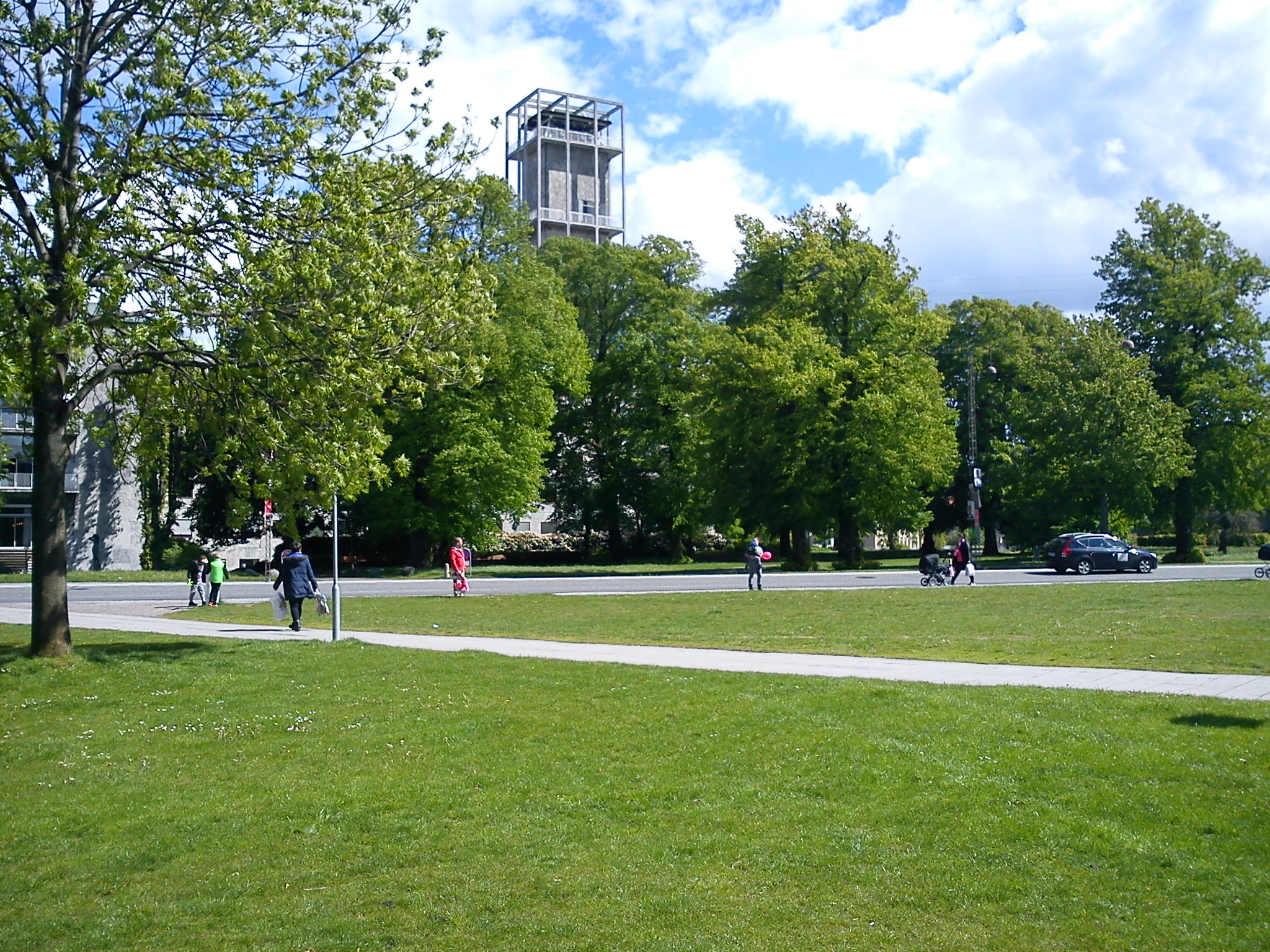
The park area viewed from Musikhusparken

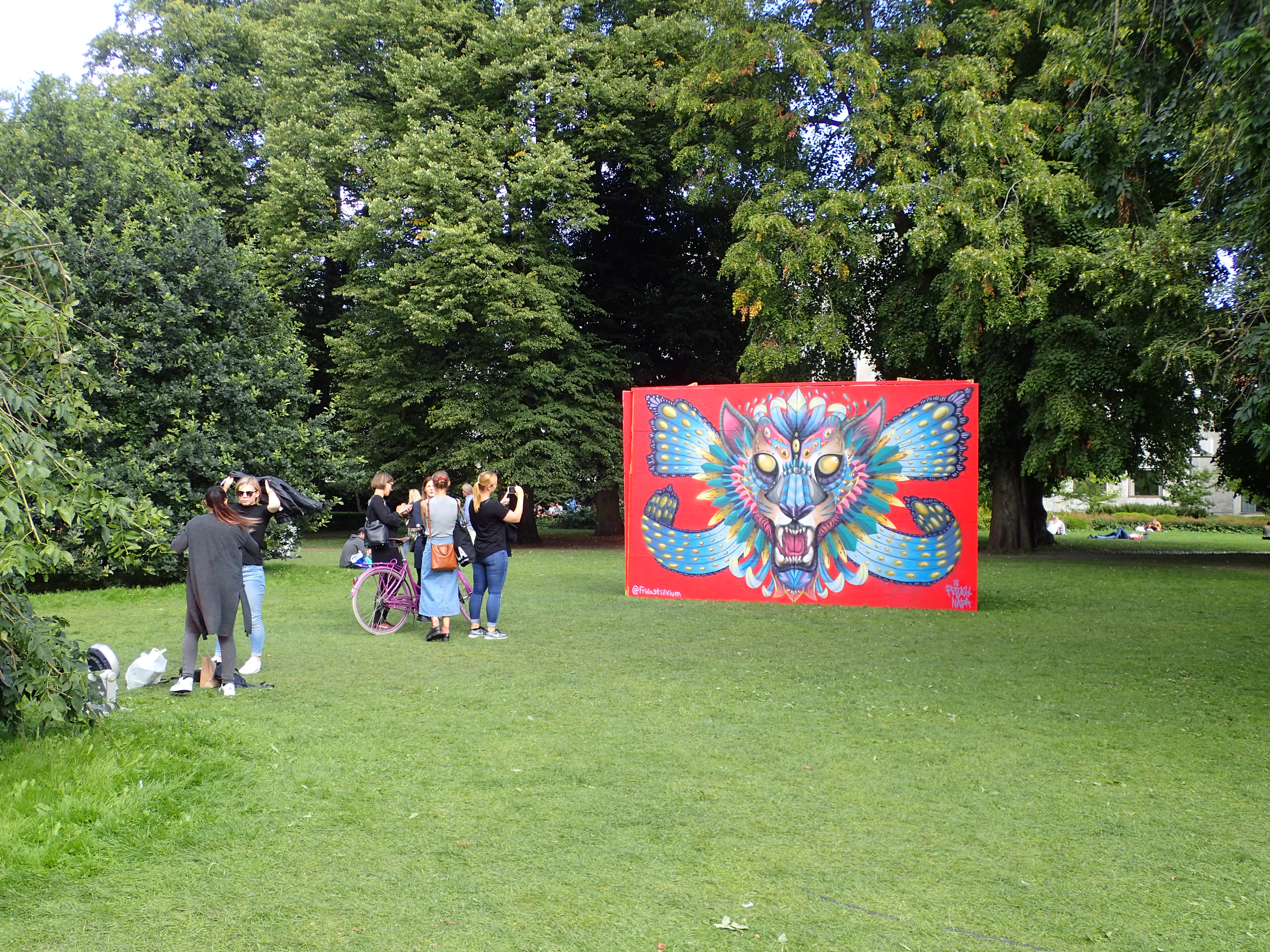
Cultural events during the annual Aarhus Festuge
