= Concert Hall Park, Aarhus =

Public park in Aarhus, Denmark

Coordinates: 56.1526°N 10.2003°E

Concert Hall Park
- Musikhusparken
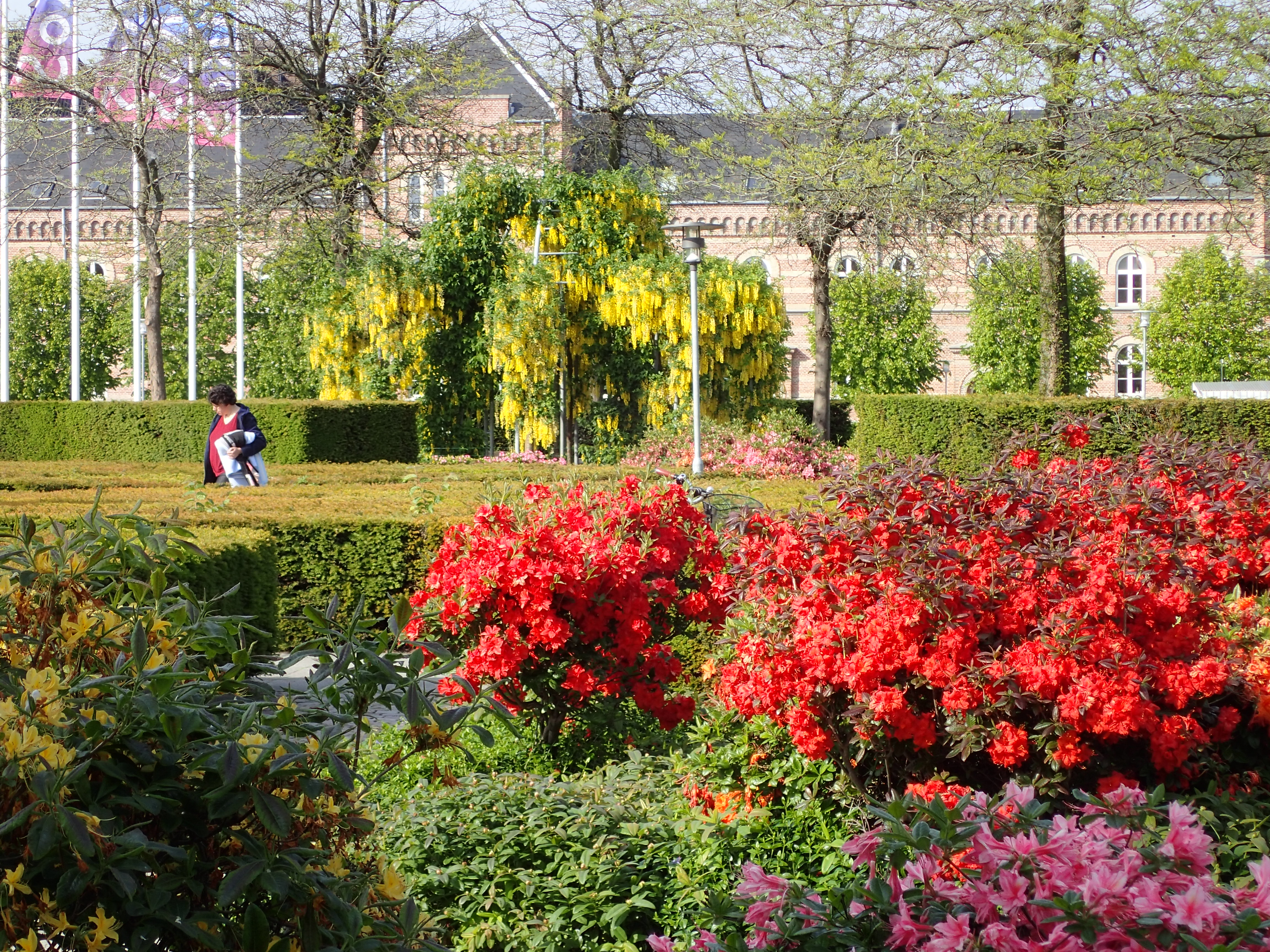
- The Concert Hall Park
- Interactive map of Concert Hall Park
- Type: Urban park
- Location: Aarhus, Denmark
- Area: 17.500 m^{2} (188.37 sq ft)
- Created: 1982
- Owner: Aarhus Municipality

The Concert Hall Park (Danish: Musikhusparken or Musikhushaven) is a public park in central Aarhus, Denmark. Following a complete redesign and reconstruction completed in 2025, the park was officially renamed "Thorkild Simonsens Park" on 4 September 2026, though it is still widely known by its former name Musikhusparken.The park is laid out in front of the Aarhus Concert Hall main entrances in the Indre By neighborhood of the inner city. It is bordered by the street Frederiks Allé to the east, Thomas Jensen's Allé to the south and Vester Allé to the north, behind the historic buildings of the former Vester Allés Barracks. The park is named after the Aarhus Concert Hall which is situated prominently immediately west of the park. The Concert Hall Park forms a center-point between some of the most prominent buildings in the city, the ARoS Aarhus Art Museum, Vester Allé Barracks, the concert halls, and Aarhus City Hall in view behind the City Hall Park across Frederiks Allé. The Concert Hall Park was designed by the landscape architect Sven Hansen as a parterre garden, and it was established in the 1980s.

The Concert Hall Park is divided geographically in two separate sections. The main section between Frederiks Allé and the Concert Hall entrances is designed as a parterre garden. The more secluded northward section is fit in between the concert halls and the ARoS art museum on a steep slope, and includes an amphitheatre and outdoor stage. The Concert Hall Park and the adjacent City Hall Park is separated by the Frederiks Allé road and have very different designs. Whereas the City Hall Park has winding paths, dense growth and an organic, sort of haphazard, design, the Concert Hall Park has an ordered, tight expression with straight paths, cropped hedges and diagonal axis' mirroring planning and order. In the central areas where paths join there are a number of fountains and benches.

The amphitheatre and outdoor stage of the Concert Hall Park is used for various events and concerts, including the SPoT Festival and Aarhus Festuge. It can accommodate 5-6000 people, depending on the setup.

== 2025 Redesign ==
The Concert Hall Park was completely rebuilt and redesigned between 2021 and 2025, opening to the public on 27 June 2025. The redesign project included closing a section of Frederiks Allé between the Concert Hall Park and the City Hall Park to car traffic, with the aim of better integrating the two parks. The project had a total construction budget of approximately 53 million Danish kroner, funded by contributions from Salling Fondene (20 million kroner), Realdania and Aarhus Municipality (each contributing 16.275 million kroner), and NRGi (approximately 950,000 kroner). More than 10,000 residents of Aarhus contributed ideas and preferences to the park’s design through public consultation.

The redesigned park was created by the Aarhus-based landscape architecture firm Schønherr in collaboration with HABITATS, Artelia, and sculptor Morten Stræde. Construction was carried out by OKNygaard.

The heart of the new park is a feature called Ringen (The Ring), an ellipse-shaped path of cobblestones enclosing a large green lawn. The park also contains the ARoS Skyspace artwork As Seen Below The Dome, a Skyspace by American artist James Turrell, a grass-covered dome structure 40 metres in diameter and 15 metres tall, open to the sky through a circular aperture at the top. A playground named Paris was designed by artist FOS along the facade of the ARoS museum. The former amphitheatre area has been replaced by a landscaped serpentine walkway called Serpentinerstien. Water art by sculptor Morten Stræde, consisting of two reflecting basins in front of the concert hall, was also incorporated into the new design.

In September 2026, the park was renamed Thorkild Simonsens Park after Thorkild Simonsen, who served as mayor of Aarhus from 1982 to 1997 and who presided over the opening of Musikhuset Aarhus in 1982. Simonsen died on 4 September 2022, the renaming ceremony took place on 4 September 2026, the fourth anniversary of his death.

== Sculptures ==
The Concert Hall Park has a number of sculptures. The best known may be "Hvalikopteren" (The Whalechopper) which Margrethe II of Denmark dubbed "Humpback Gunship" when she saw it for the first time. The sculpture is formed as a metal whale with a helicopter rotor, designed by the Australian artist Benjamin Gilberts for the Danish version of Sculpture by the Sea.

The Danish sculptor Gudrun Steen-Andersen is represented with the bronze sculpture Vokseværk (Growth Pains) from 1989. It is a naturalistic interpretation of young boy placed by the large mirror-pool in front of the concert hall. Gudrun Steen-Andersen's own son modeled for the sculpture and today he teaches at the Royal Academy of Music, Aarhus/Aalborg inside the concert hall. Ejler Bille created the abstract sculpture Saurion which is placed in front of the main entrance to the concert hall. Erik Varming designed and donated an abstract sculpture carved from granite, situated behind the amphitheatre. Anker Hoffman created l'etude or "sitting girl in bronze" which was donated by the bank Sparekassen SDS to the mayor of Aarhus, Orla Hyllested.

== Gallery ==
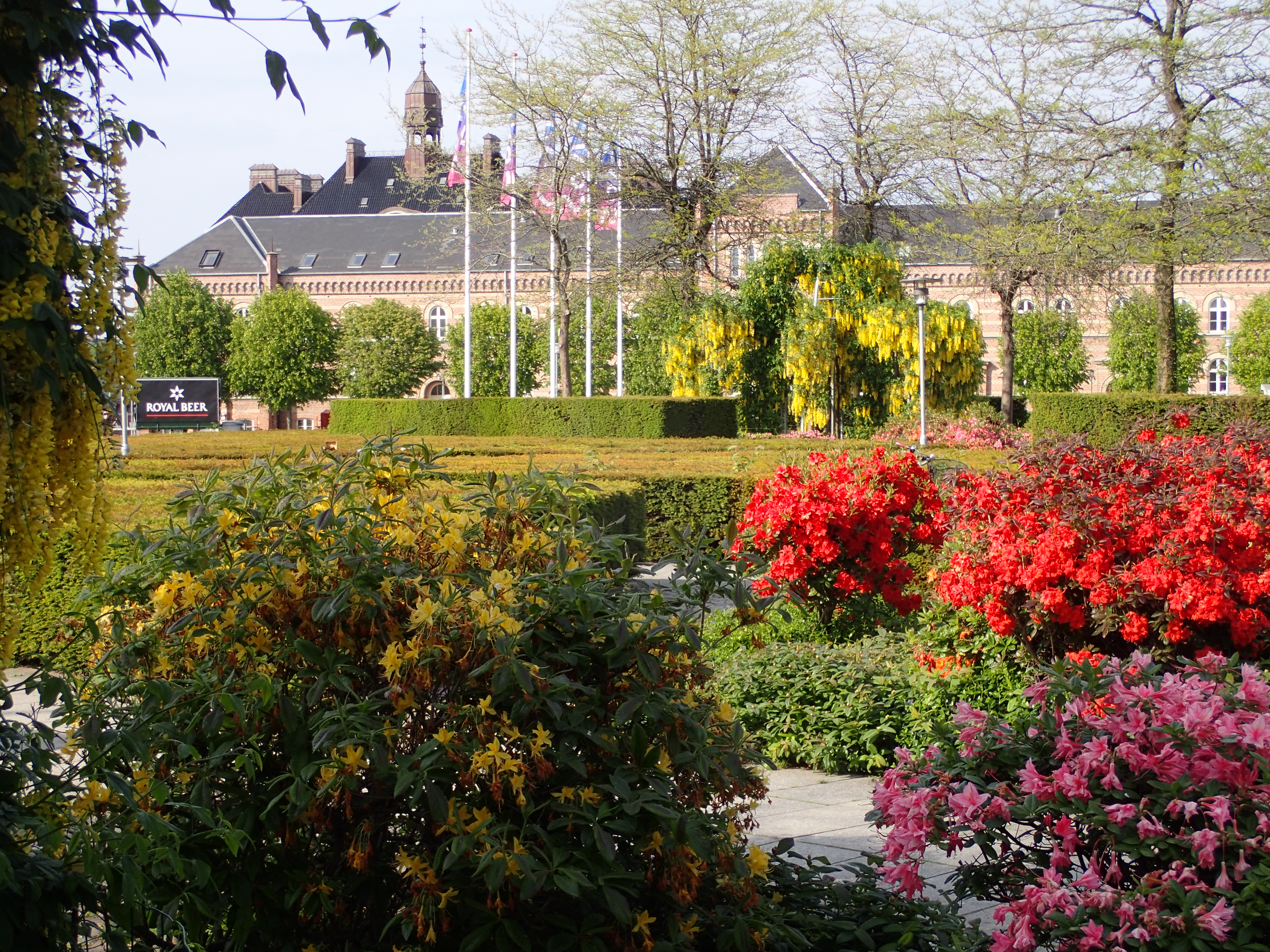

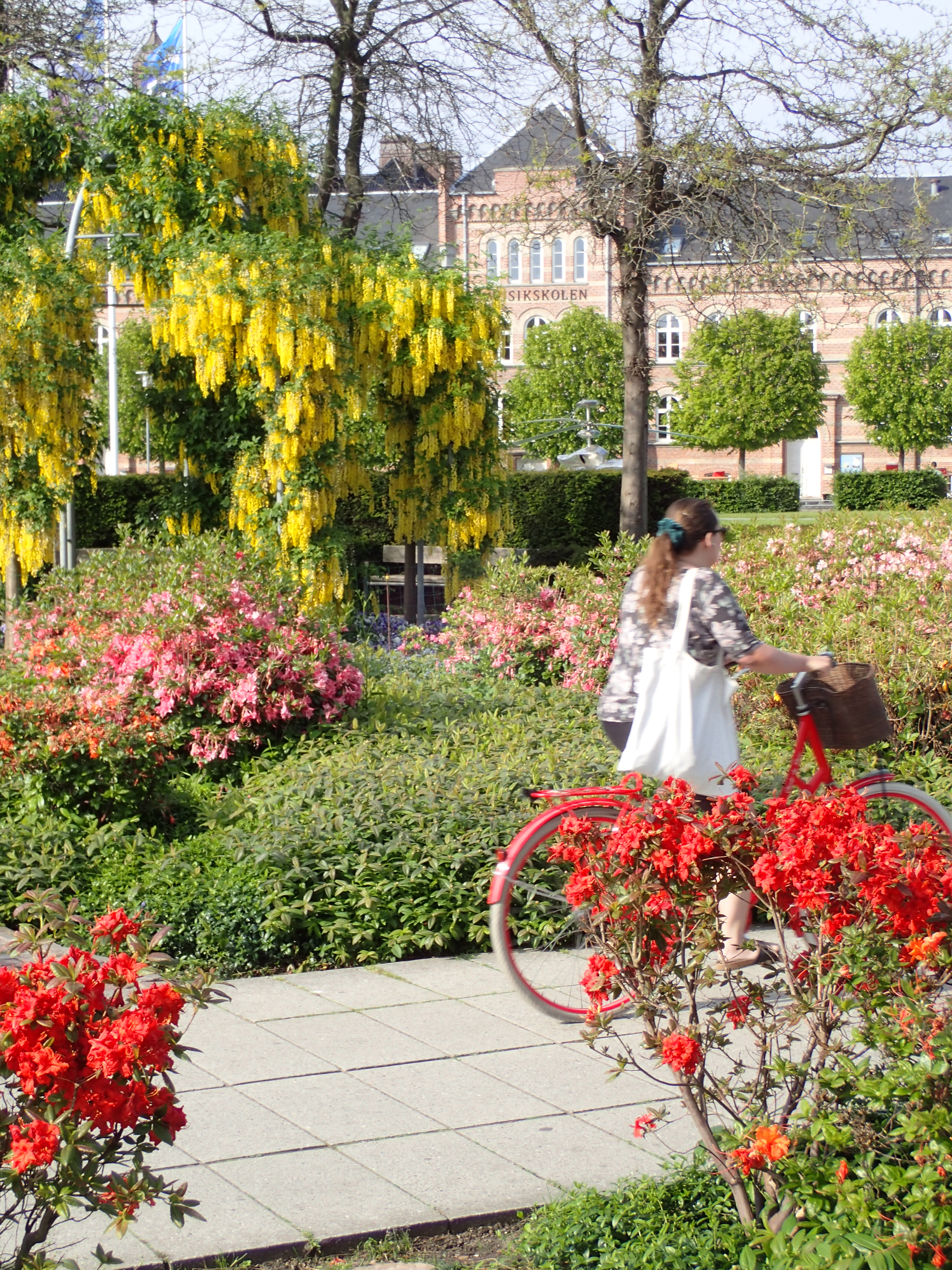

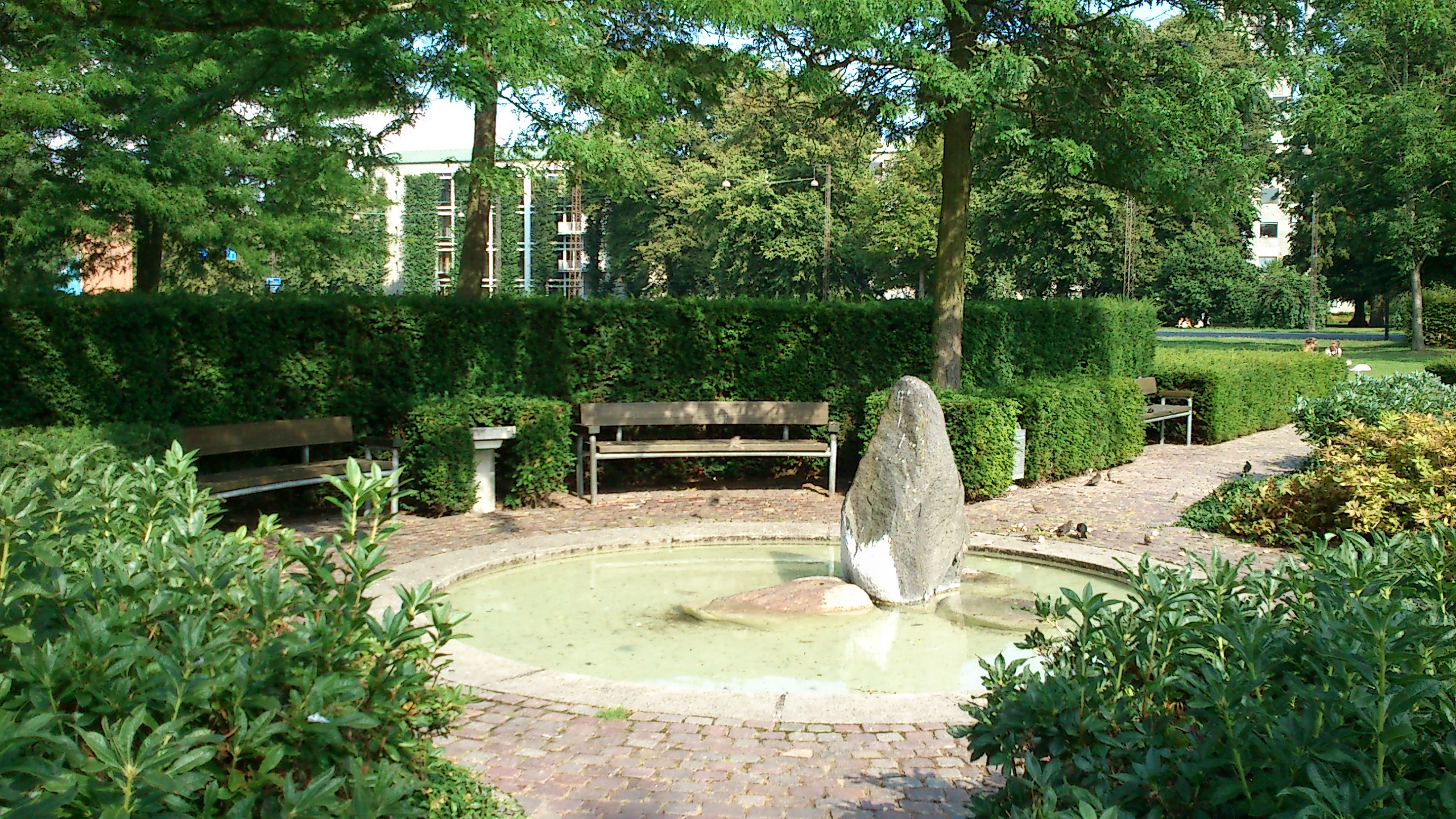

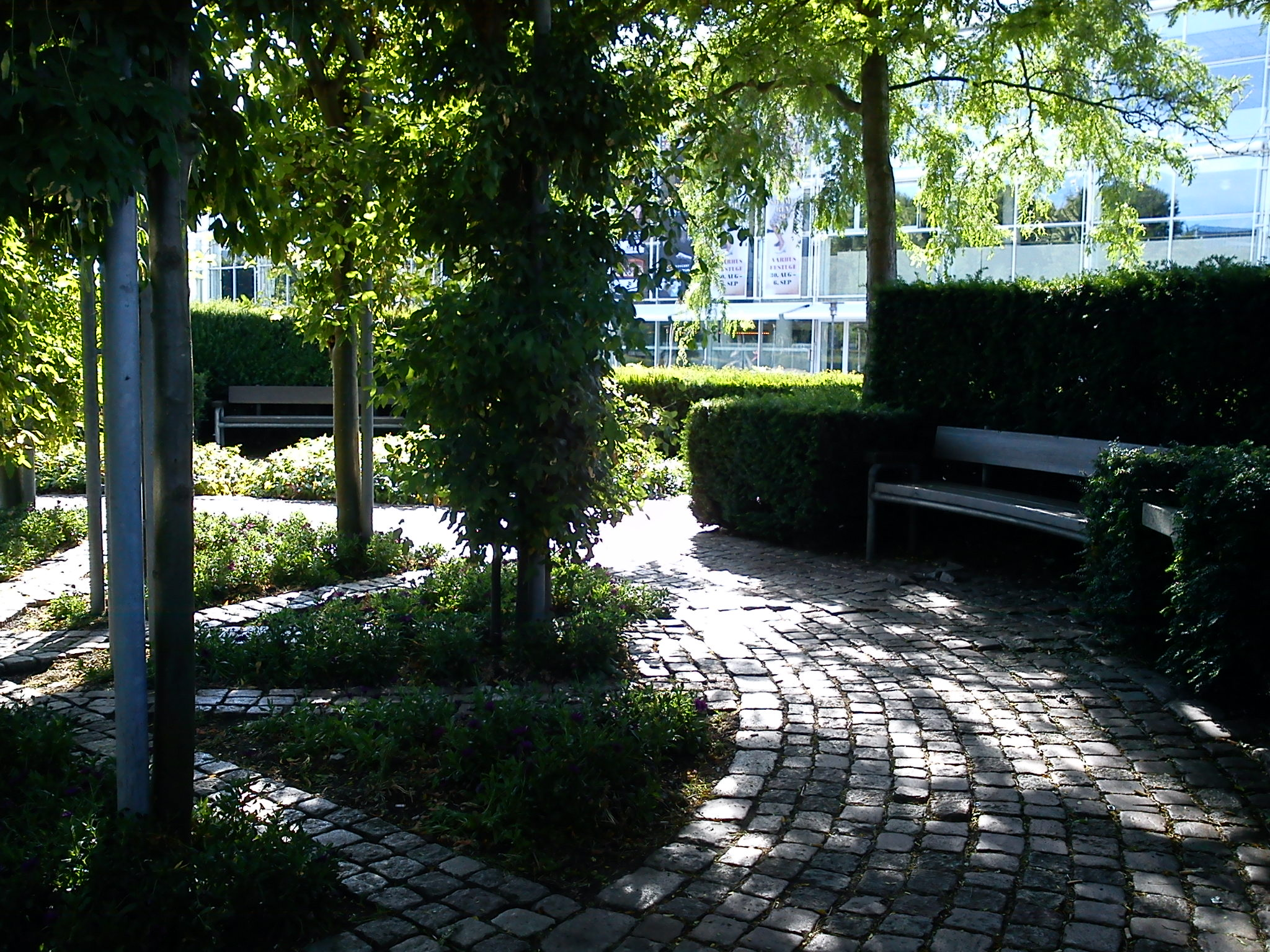

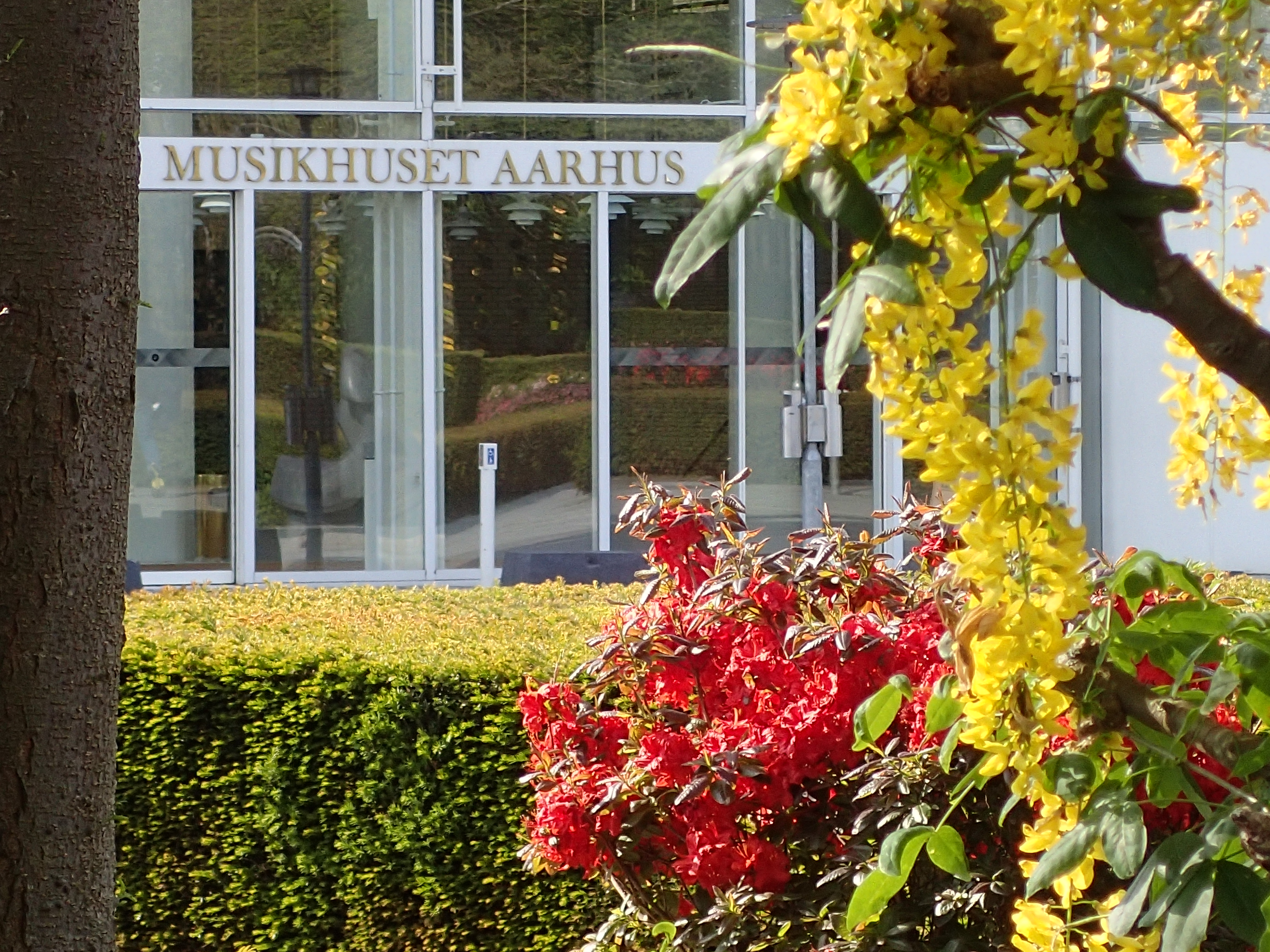

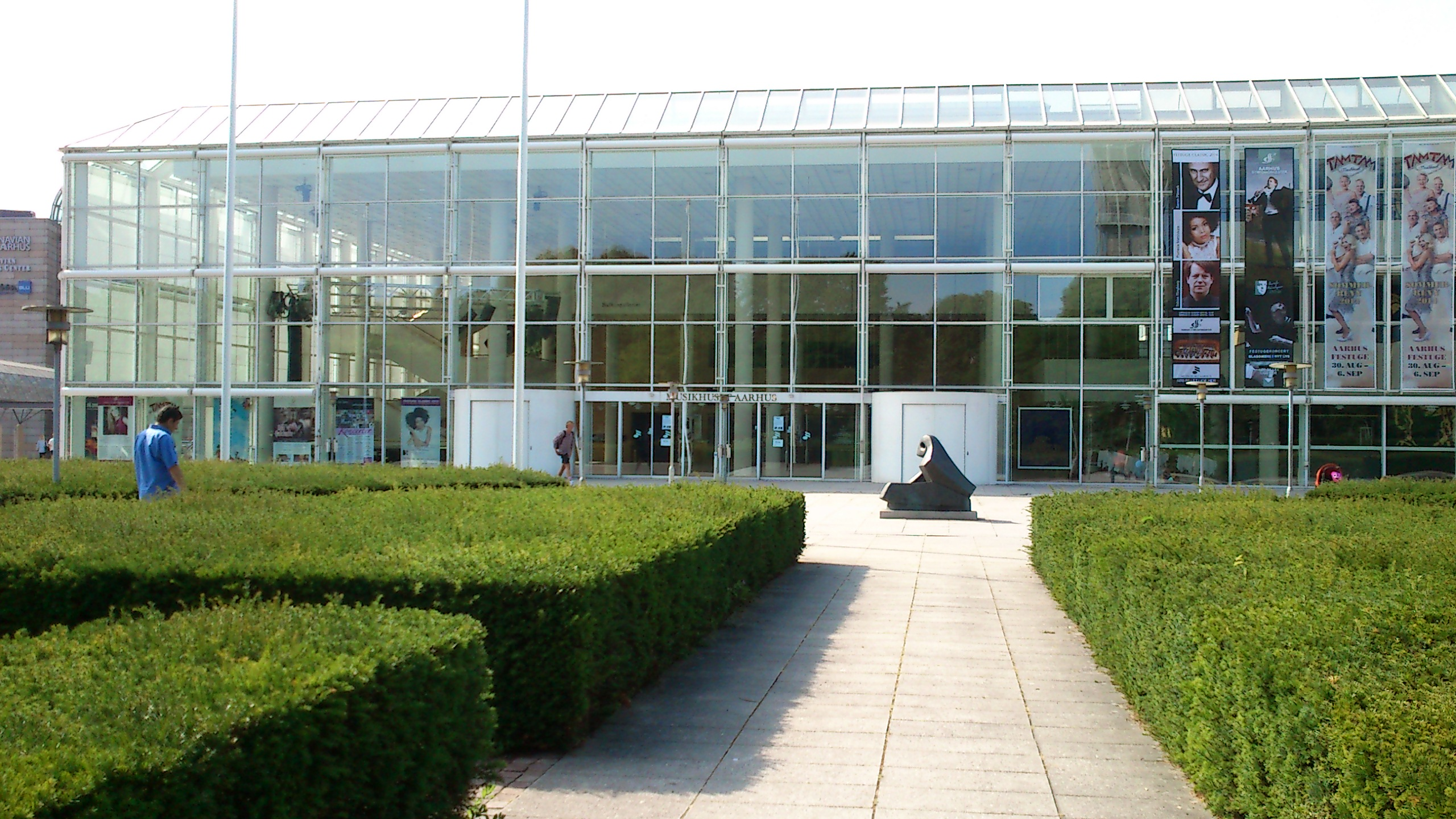

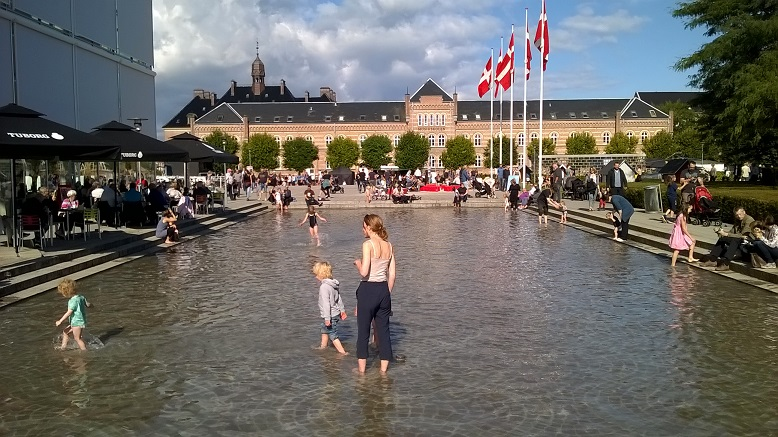

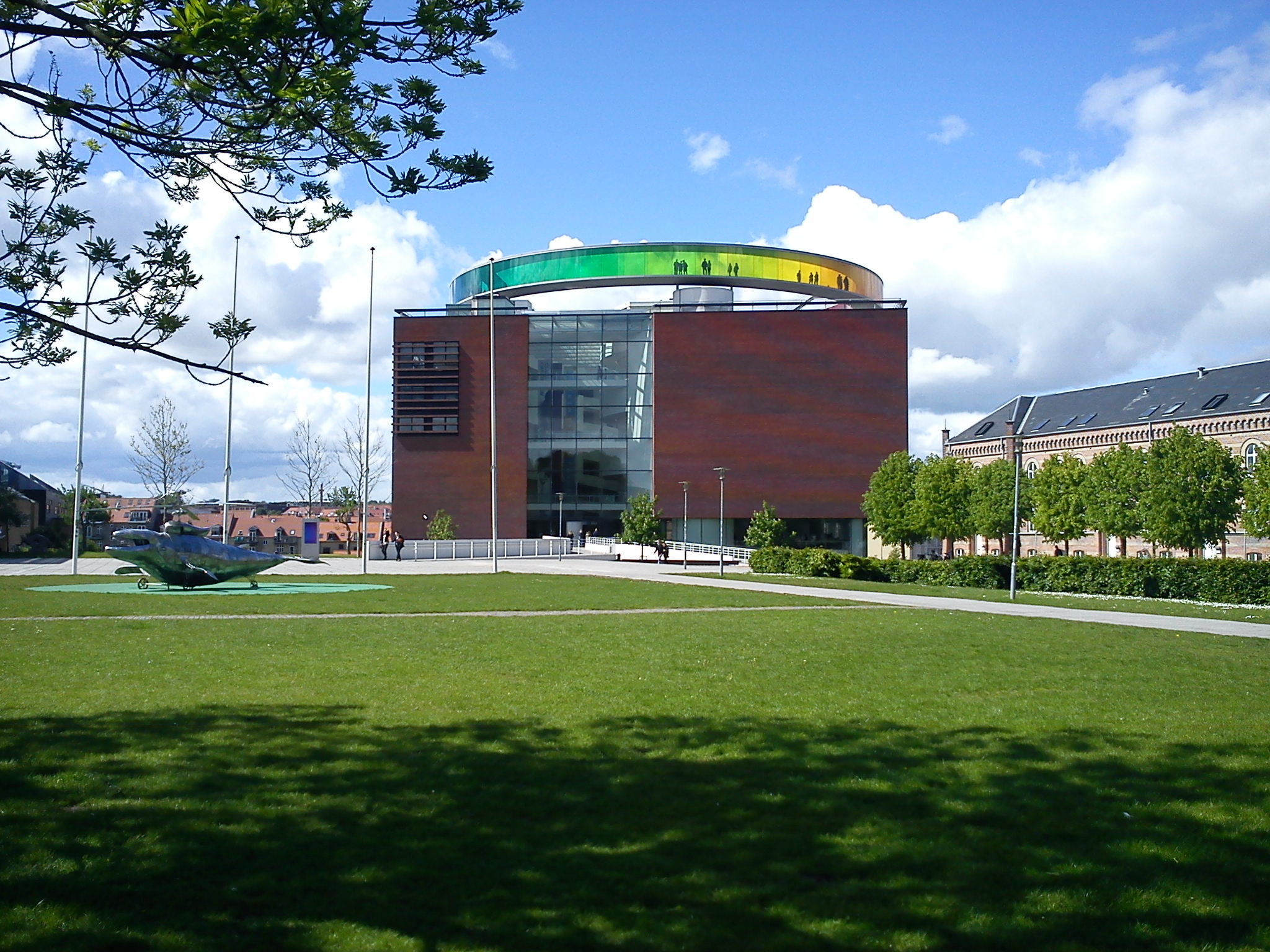
