= Jacob Gade Kollegiet =

Building in Copenhagen

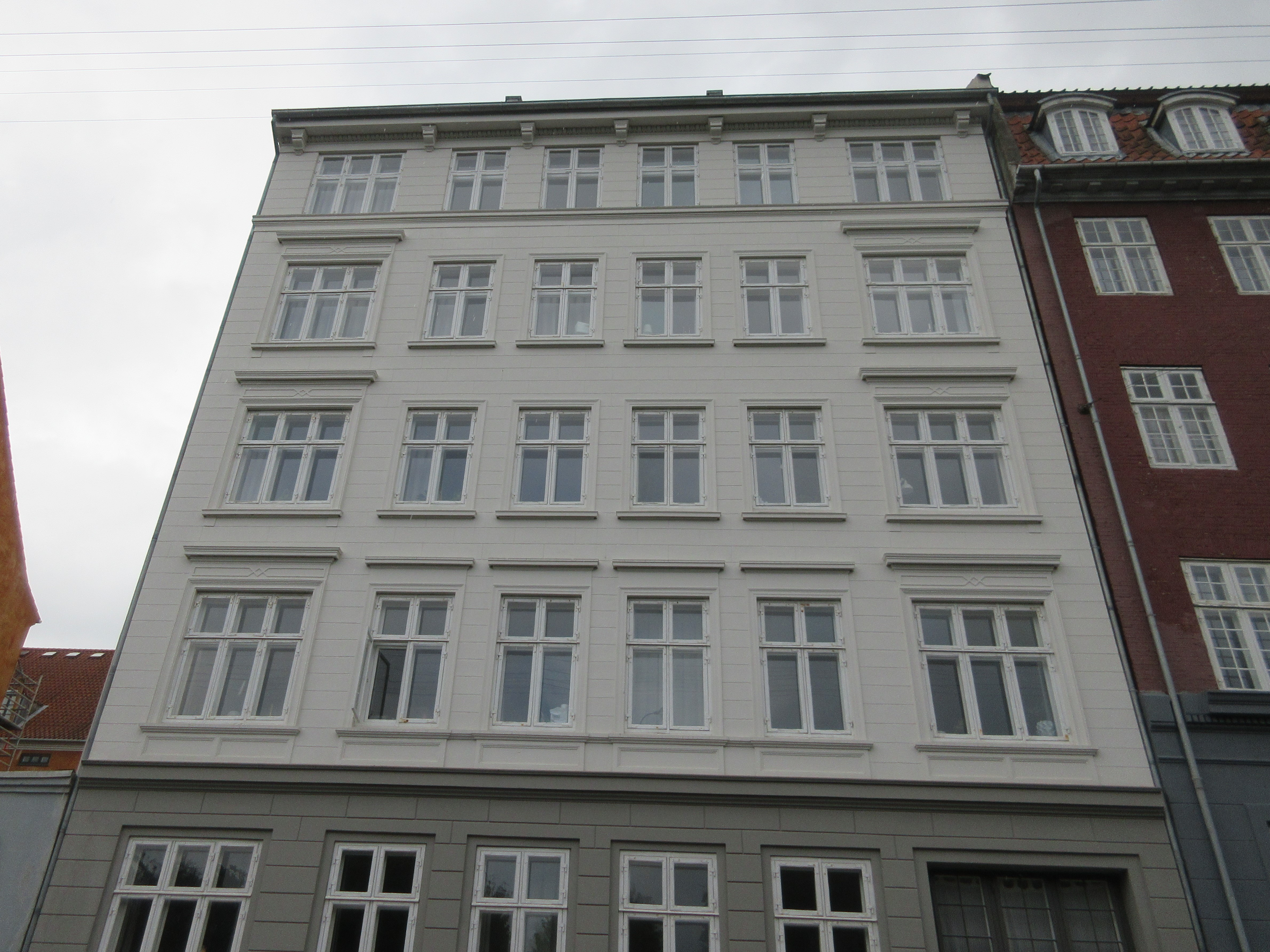
- Interactive map of the Jacob Gade Kollegiet area

General information
- Location: Copenhagen, Denmark
- Coordinates: 55°41′6.53″N 12°34′58.86″E
- Completed: 1805

Jacob Gade Kollegiet is a hall of residence for students at the Royal Danish Academy of Music located at Kronprinsessegade 44 in central Copenhagen, Denmark. The building is owned by Jacob Gades Legat, a foundation established by Jacob Gade. The building was listed on the Danish registry of protected buildings and places in 1945.

== History ==
=== Construction ===
The still empty property was listed in the new cadastre of 1806 as No. 402 in St. Ann's West Quarter. The present building on the site was constructed 1804–1805 by master carpenter Peder Christian Sabroe (born c. 1742). It was completed after his death for his widow Cathrina Margrethe Sabroe.

=== 1834 census ===
August Fredericke Charstenschiold, a widow with means, resided on the second floor at the 1834 census. She lived there with her daughter Johanne Elisabeth and one maid.

=== 1840 census ===
Jens Christian Haugaard, a gunmaker in the Jutland Infantry Regiment, resided in the ground-floor apartment at the time of the 1840 census. He lived there with his wife Eline Margrethe Heickelmann, their four children (aged one to eight) and a maid. Augusta Fredrikke Carstenskjold, a widow, resided on the second floor with her daughter Johanne Cecilia Elisabeth Carstenskjold and a maid. Sophie Schule, another widow, resided on the same floor with her two unmarried daughters (aged 24 and 41). Christian Engelbrecht Andersen, a junior clerk (copyist), resided on the third floor with his wife Oline Emilie Jonassen. Christian Larsen, a barkeeper, resided in the basement with his wife Ane Marie Larsen, their 16-year-old daughter Elisabeth Larsen and three lodgers (a student, ropemaker and soldier).

=== 1945 census ===
The property was home to eight households at the 1845 census. Caroline Gerner, widow of a commodore, resided on the first floor to the right with her daughter Margrethe Frederikke Gerner and one maid. Christiane Sommer (née Kaasbøll), 1880–1852, widow of major Hans Jessen Sommer (1877–1830), resided on the first floor to the left with her daughter Mathilde Henriette Sommer (1811–1880; later married to the landscape painter A.W. Boesen) and one maid. Two widows, Marie Manzius and Juliane Kjølstrup, resided on the second floor to the left with a maid. Elisabeth Christiane Jacobsen and Ferdinandine Jacobine Antoinette Jacobsen, two unmarried women occupied with needlework, resided on the second floor to the right with two lodgers and a maid. Elisabeth Christiane Jacobsen, Ferdinandine Jacobine Antoinette Jacobsen and Frederikke Charlotte Jacobsen, three women occupied with needlework, resided on the third floor to the right with two lodgers and one maid. Johannes Wilhelm Ferdinand Thomsen, a copyist at Copenhagen's Magistrate, resided on the third floor to the left with his wife Louise Antoinette født Louison. Jens Christian Haugaard, a gunmaker, resided on the ground floor with his wife Eline Margrete Haugaard født Heichemann, their four children (aged six to 13) and one maid. Catrine Marie Jensen, a widow with a pension, resided in the basement with two lodgers, a maid, a mason and another maid.

=== 1846–1900 ===
The building was heightened with one floor in 1846.

=== 20th century ===
Den Indre B's Kristelige sociale Arbejde operated a combined daycare and after school programme (fritidshjem) in the building from around 1900. The building was adapted in 1927–1928.

In 1972, Jacob Gades Legat purchased the building. It was subsequently converted into a hall of residence for students at the Royal Danish Academy of Music. The last regular tenants moved out in 2009. The building was refurbished in 2012–14 with assistance from Erik Møller Arkitekter.

== Today ==
The complex comprises 21 apartments. Several students share each apartment.
