= Guldberg =

Guldberg is a Scandinavian surname. Notable people with the surname include:

- Cathinka Guldberg (1840–1919), Norwegian nurse
- Cato Maximilian Guldberg (1836–1902), Norwegian mathematician and chemist
- Emmerik Høegh-Guldberg (1807–1881), Danish painter
- Julius Høegh-Guldberg (1779–1861), Danish officer and politician
- Christopher Julius Emil Høegh-Guldberg (1842–1907), Danish politician
- Mogens Guldberg (born 1963), Danish middle-distance runner
- Ove Guldberg (1918–2008), Danish politician
- Ove Høegh-Guldberg (born Guldberg) (1731–1808), Danish statesman, historian and de facto Prime Minister of Denmark
- Ove Hoegh-Guldberg (biologist) (born 1959), Danish-Australian biologist
- Stig Guldberg (1916–1980), Danish founder of the Guldberg-Plan
