= Stig Guldberg =

Founder of Guldberg-Plan

Stig Guldberg (November 26, 1916 in Denmark - April 18, 1980) is founder of the Guldberg-Plan, a society, which has been organising rehabilitation camps for handicapped children since 1950.

Guldberg, who himself had lost his left forearm and his right hand due to an accident on February 18, 1947, made it possible for more than 15,000 children to participate in his camps until his death in 1980. Guldberg was awarded the Order of Merit of the Federal Republic of Germany by former German President Theodor Heuss in 1958.

From 1963 to 1983, the Guldberg-Plan Society ran a summer camp facility of its own in Kramnitze near Rødby at the Danish island of Lolland.

Guldberg's work is continued in Germany by the Deutsche Arbeitsgruppe Guldberg-Plan für die psychische Rehabilitation behinderter Kinder - gemeinnütziger Verein e.V. (DAGP) (German Working Group Guldberg-Plan for the Mental Rehabilitation of Handicapped Children - Charitable Society) founded in 1974. The rehabilitation measures during Easter and in summer are directed at school boys and girls with any kind of physical disability. The therapeutic approach developed by Guldberg, fostering the child's independence and self-confindence, is the focus of all activities.
