= Erik Møller =

Danish architect (1909–2002)

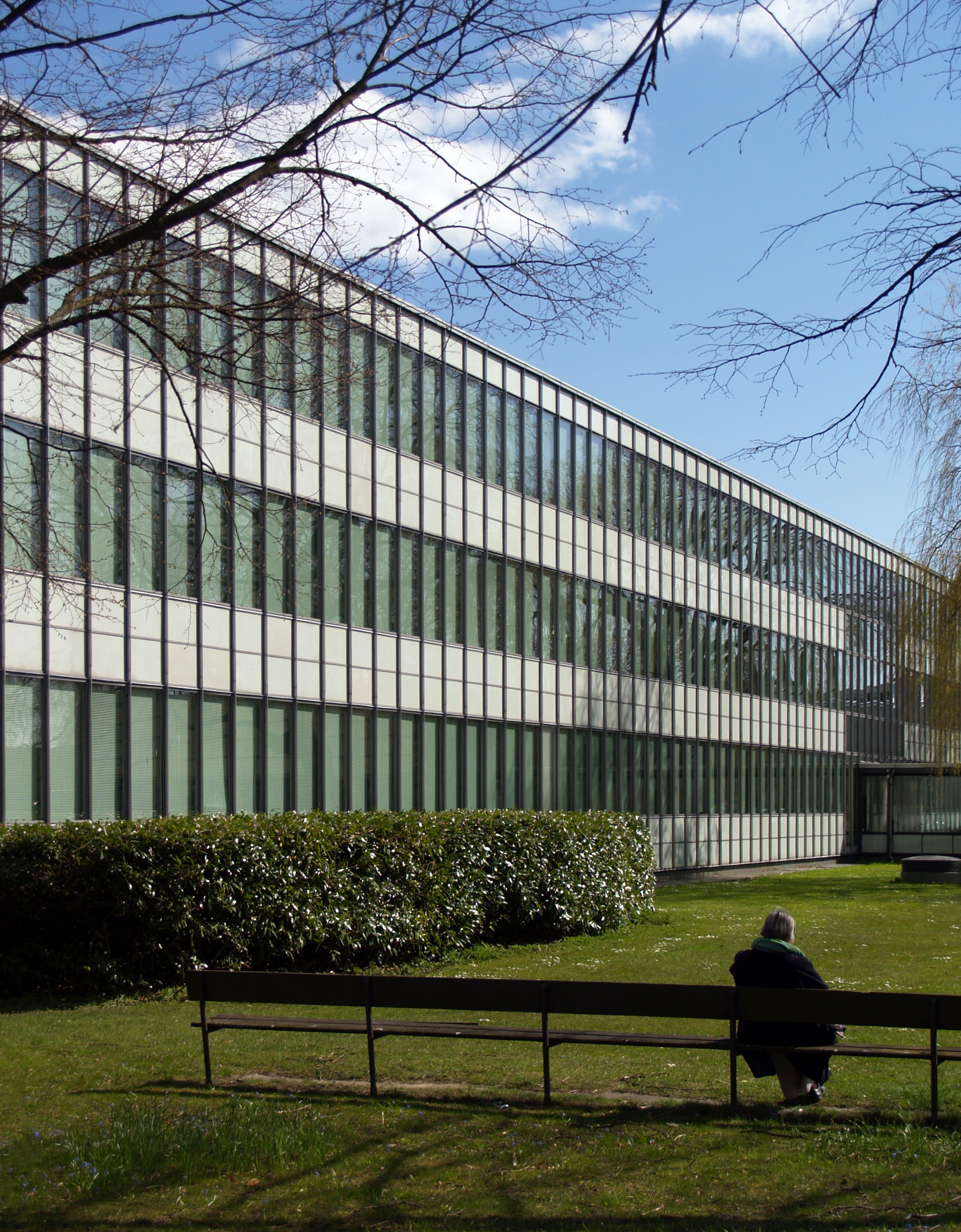
The City Hall of Rødovre developed with Arne Jacobsen.

Erik Møller (7 November 1909 – 24 March 2002) was a Danish architect.

Møller used to work with the famous Danish architect and designer Arne Jacobsen. Together they won the competition to design the new City Hall in Aarhus, which was built from 1938 to 1942. At the same time they built another town hall in Søllerød. From 1955 to 1956 they built the City Hall in Rødovre. This was the first construction with a curtain wall in Denmark.

His description of Jacobsen's SAS Royal Hotel project as a "glass cigar box" was widely used later on.
