= Aarhus City Hall =

Building in Denmark

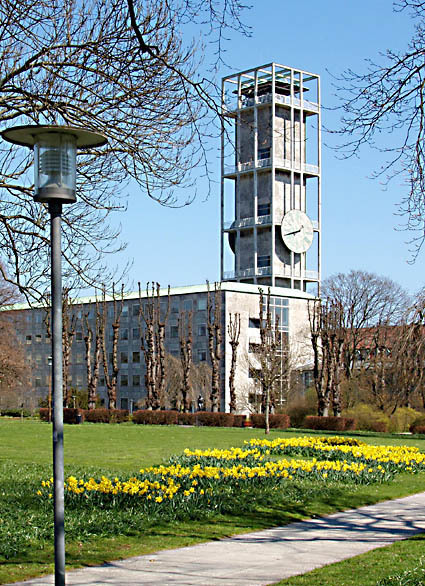

General information
- Status: Completed
- Type: Administrative
- Location: Aarhus, Denmark
- Coordinates: 56.153056°N 10.203333°E
- Completed: 1941

Design and construction
- Architects: Arne Jacobsen and Erik Møller

Aarhus City Hall (Danish: Aarhus Rådhus) is the city hall of Aarhus, Denmark. The decision to build a new city hall was taken during a city hall meeting in 1937. The new building was inaugurated 2 June 1941, designed by architects Arne Jacobsen and Erik Møller. On the first proposal, the plans did not include a tower but due to massive public pressure it was later added to the drawings along with the idea to clad the structure in marble. Hans Wegner was in charge of the furnishing - which is uniquely designed to fit the building -, and parts of the interior design.

== Architecture and design ==
The city hall has a total area of 19,380 m^{2} including the basement. The tower is 60 m tall and the tower clock face has a diameter of 7 m. The building is made of concrete plated with 6,000 m^{2} of grey marble from Porsgrunn Municipality in Norway. On the outside, copper is used for many architectural details, signified by the characteristic green verdigris. The interior is more luscious in its expression with oaken parquet floors, ceramic tile floors in various patterns, specially designed wooden furniture, glass walls, wooden walls and large wall paintings and decorations. Inside, brass and bronze is used for metal architectural details.

The price for the building was 9.5 mio. DKK, including the cost of the land area and inventory which in itself comprised 1.5 mio. DKK. As one of just a few Danish city halls, it was marked for preservation in March 1994 because of its unique architecture and design. In January 2006, the city hall was included in the Danish Culture Canon under architecture.

The city hall features as the main location of the short film Nada - Act II by Slovenian artist Jasmina Cibic.

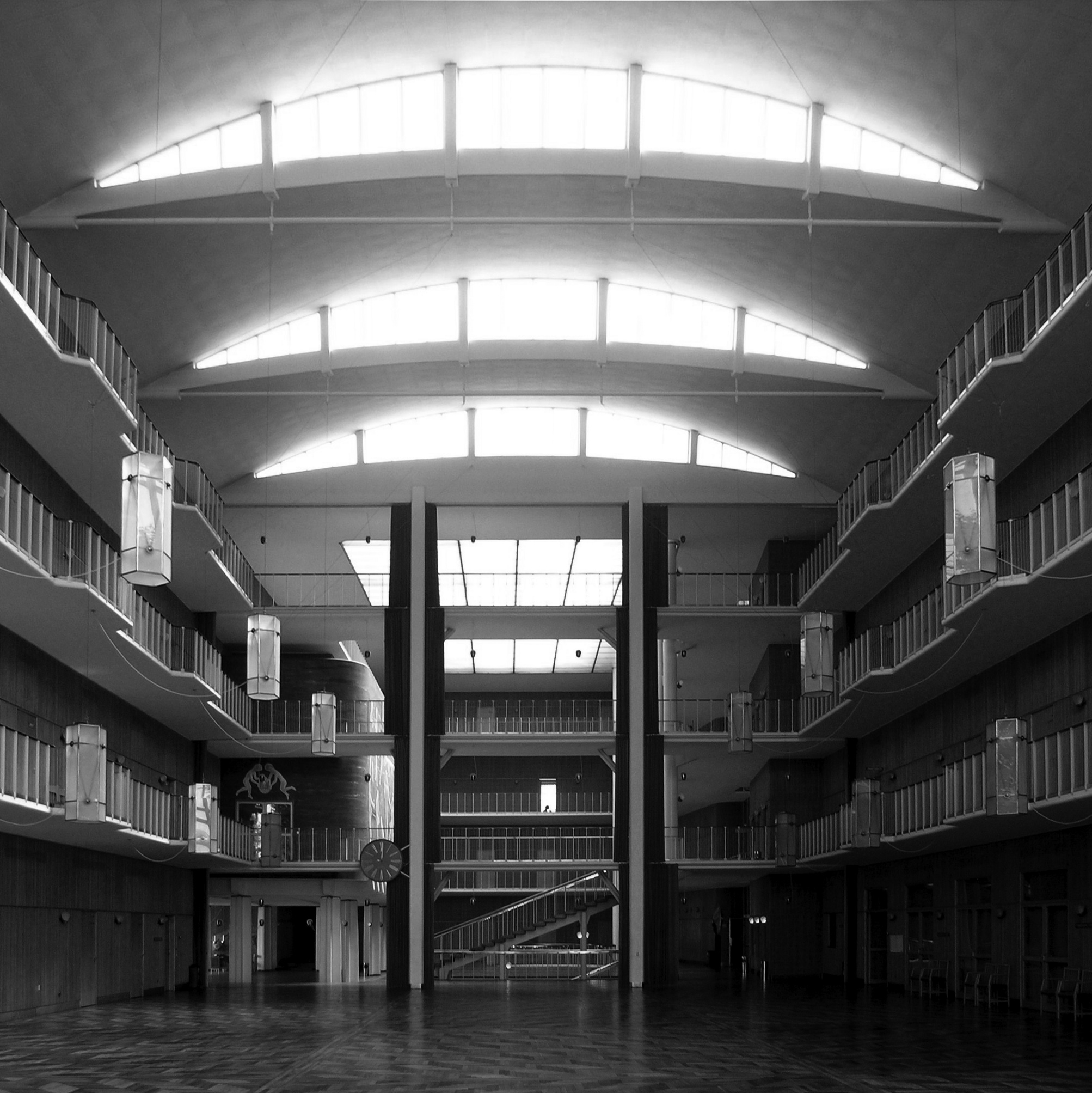
Interior

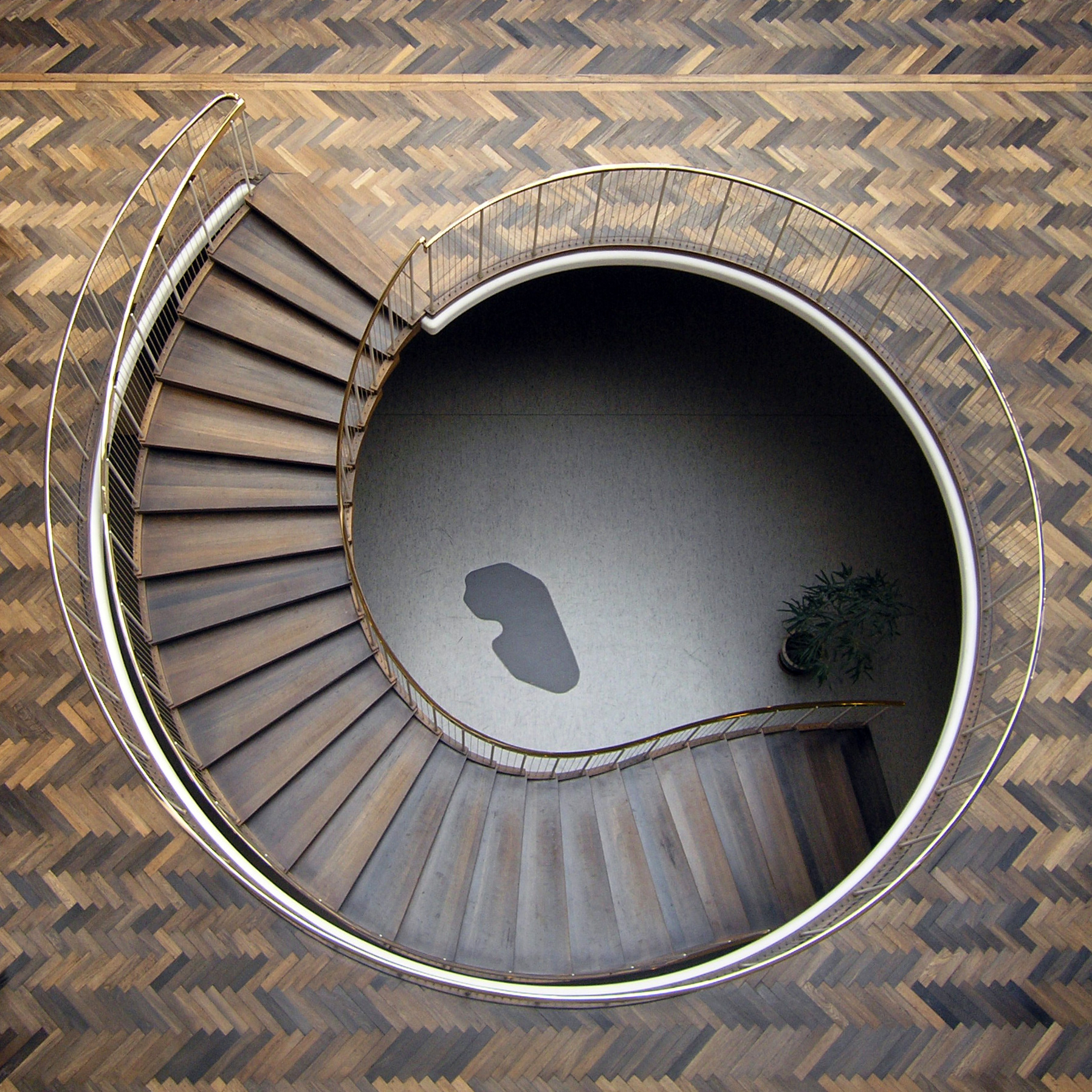
Staircase

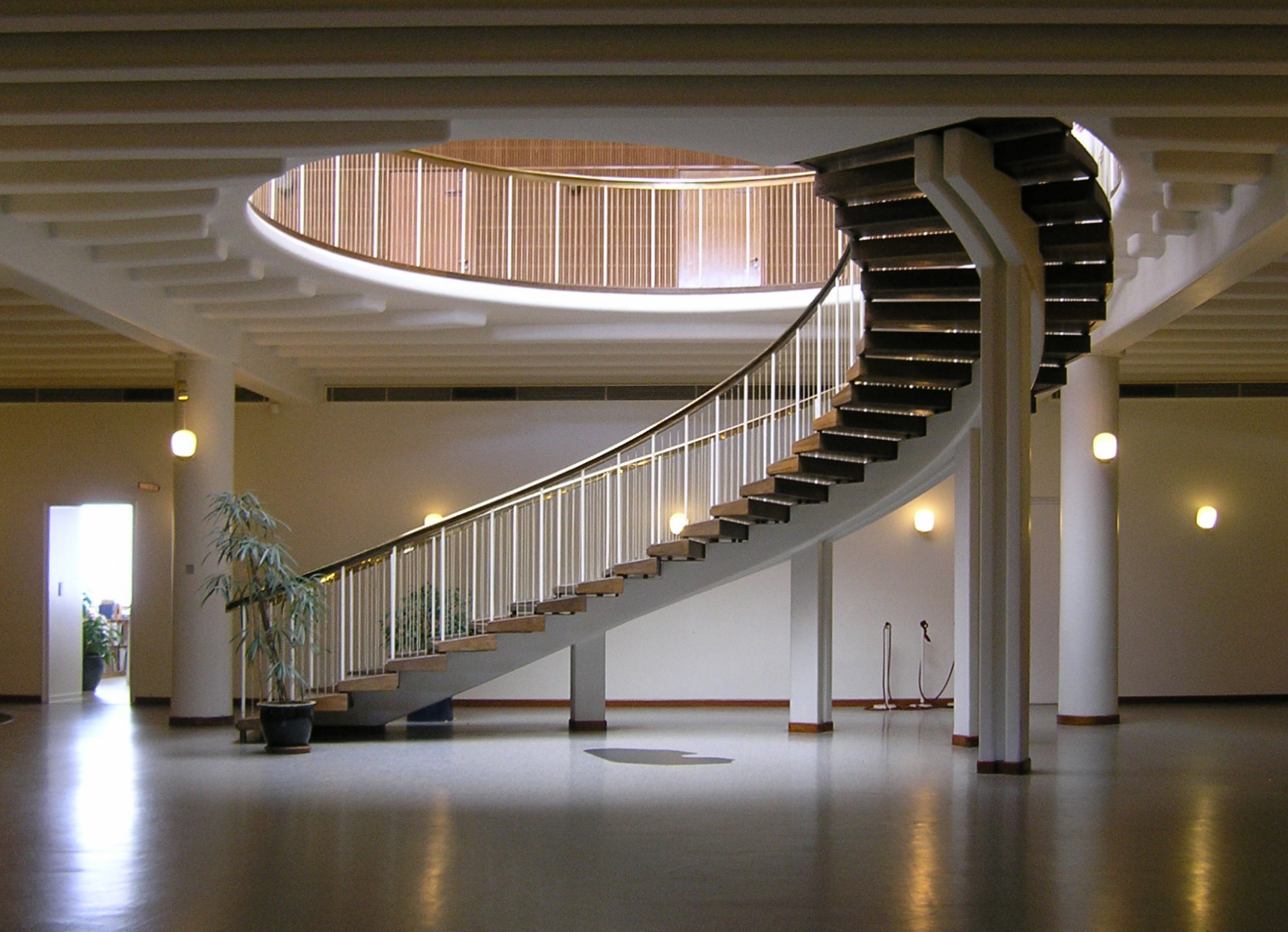
Staircase

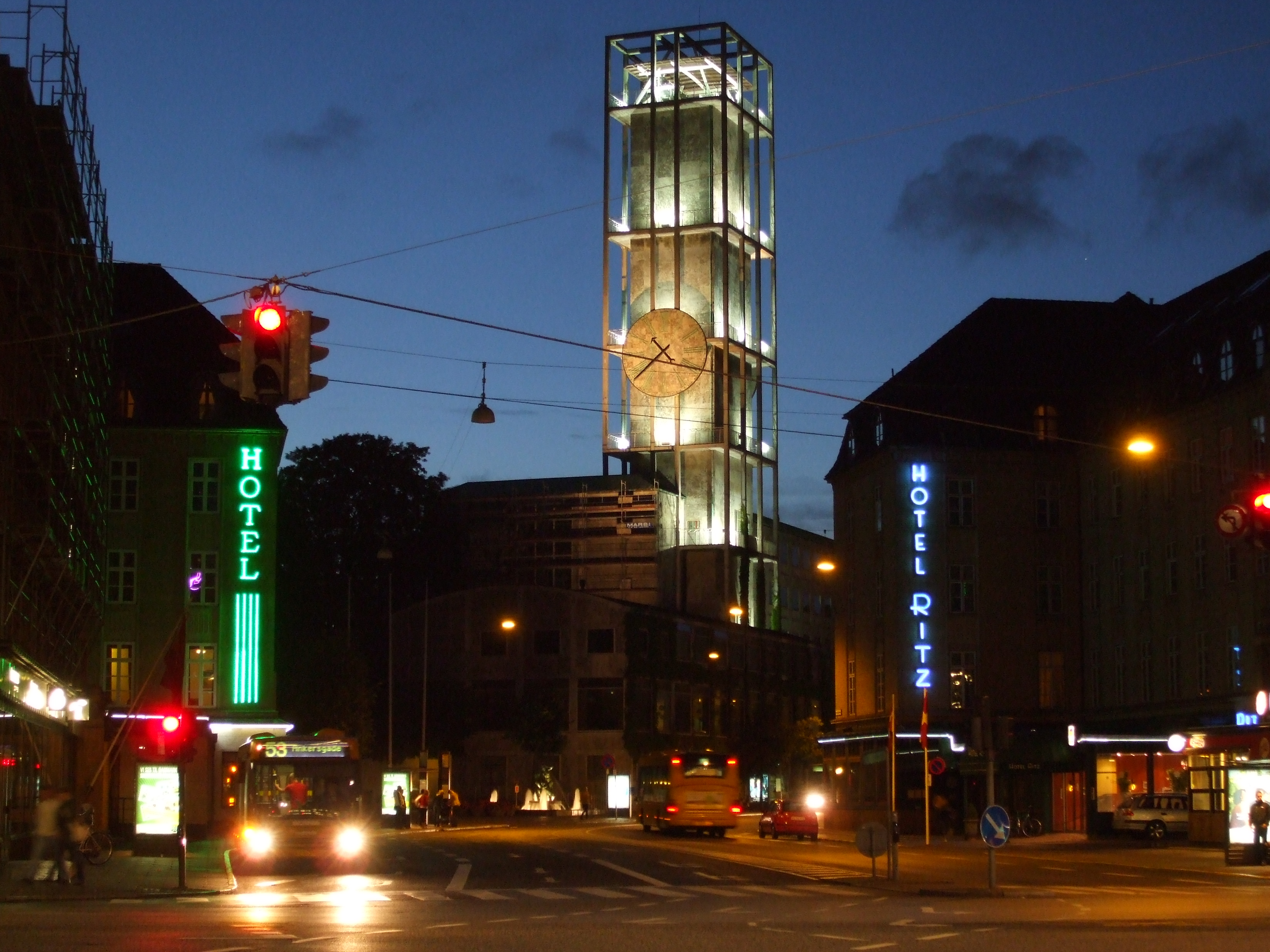
By night

== Former city halls ==
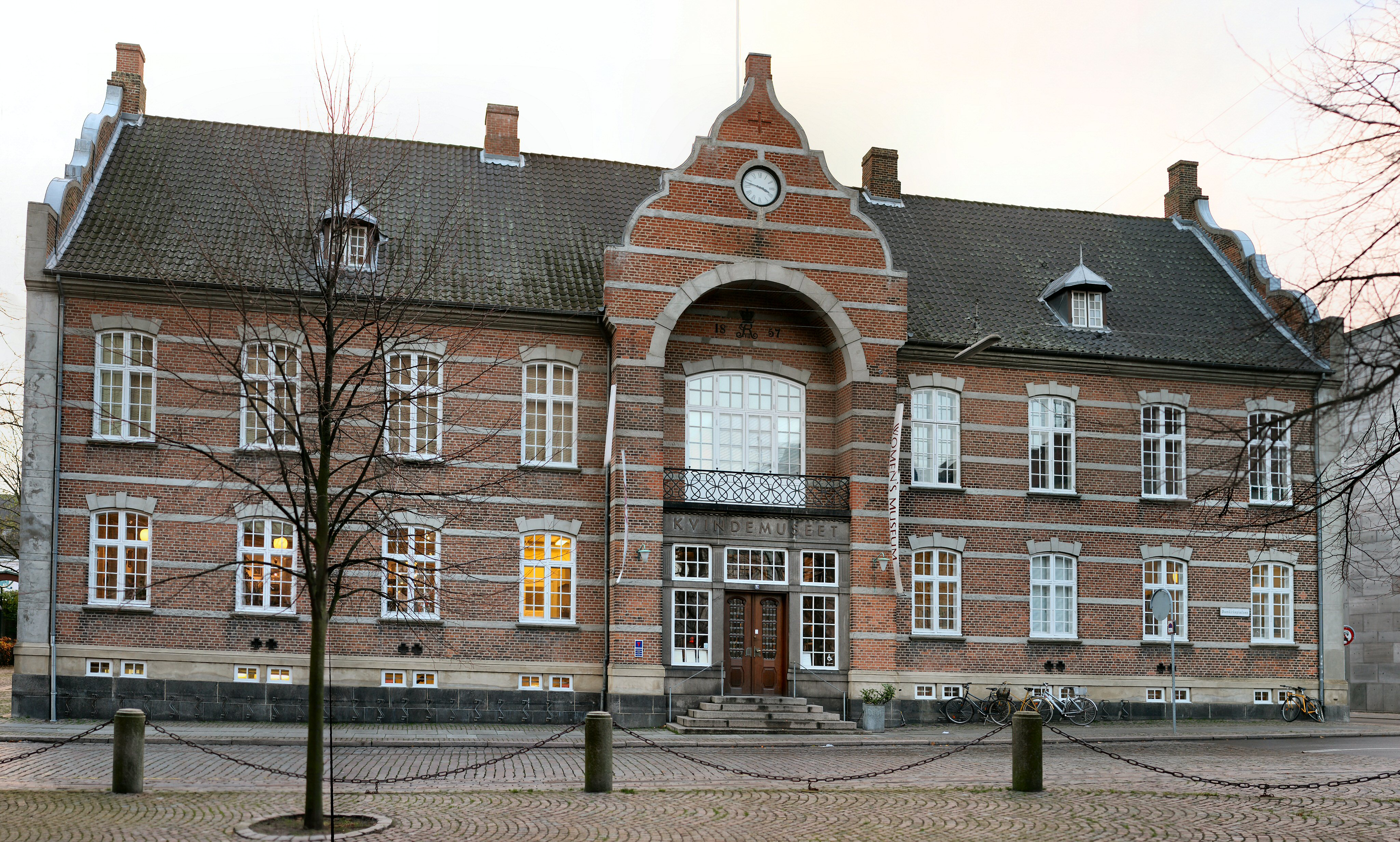
The old city hall (2nd). The building now houses a museum of women's history.

Aarhus has officially had two former city halls. The first was erected in the middle of the 15th century and was situated in front of the tower of the Aarhus Cathedral. It was demolished in 1859.

The second city hall was erected during 1856 and 1857, immediately northeast of the Cathedral. Officially it was city hall, courthouse and penitentiary. From 1856 to 1906, the county councils also held their meetings in the building and the Aarhus art museum, that now has evolved to become the ARoS art museum, started out in the attic in 1859. When the building was not needed as a city hall any longer due to the erection of the present city hall, the building was in use as a police station between 1941 and 1984. Today the building houses Kvindemuseet, a museum for women's culture and history in Denmark.

== Surroundings ==
The Aarhus City Hall is situated in Rådhusparken (The City Hall Park). The park is rather small, but marks the main entrance to the city for travellers arriving at the Central Station close by and hosts various events throughout the year. The City Hall Park connects with the park area in front of The Concert Hall of Aarhus (Danish: Musikhuset) and leads to the central square of Rådhuspladsen (The City Hall Square).

The City Hall Park
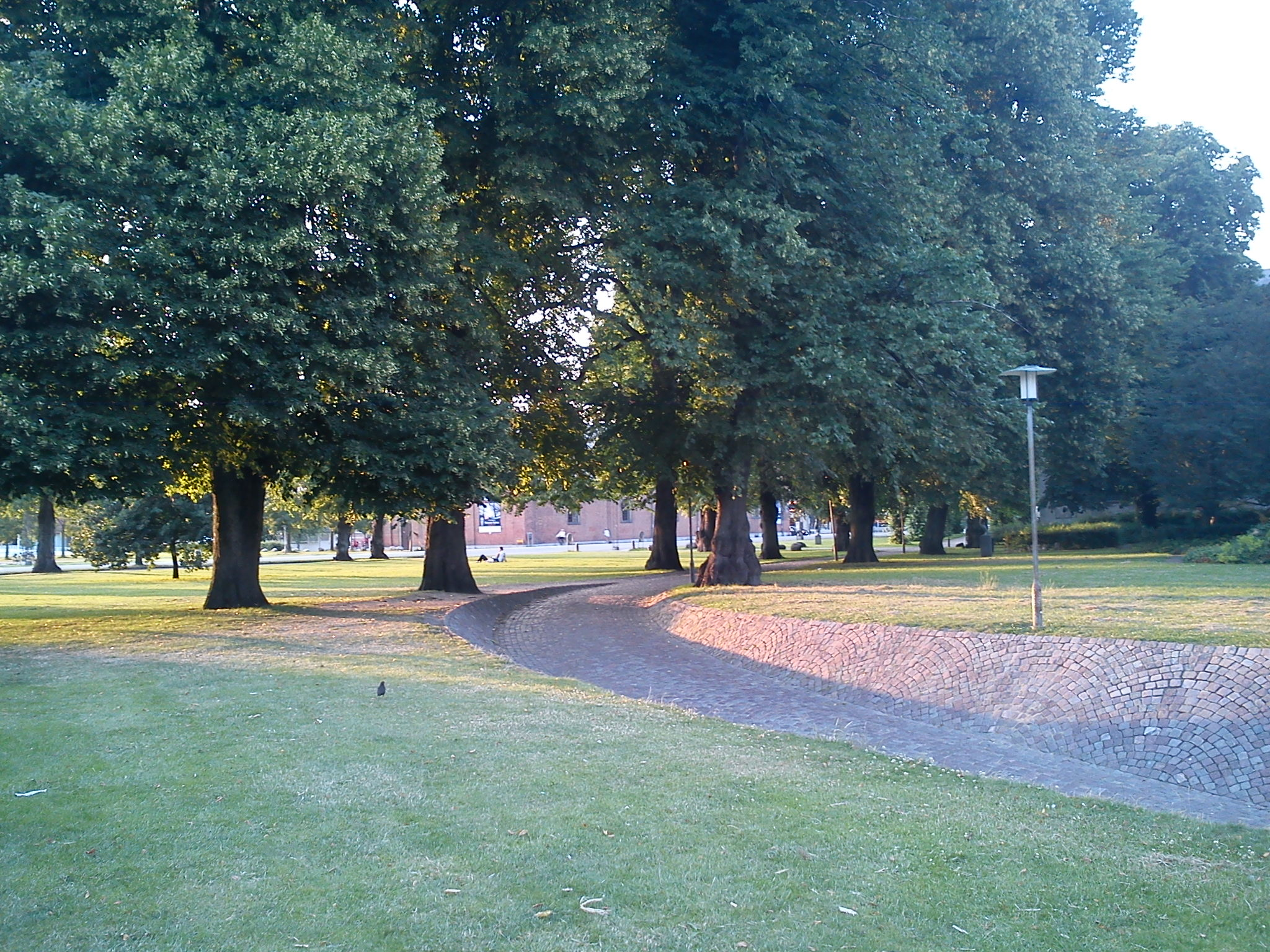
The entrancepath showing the characteristic pavement of Aarhus.

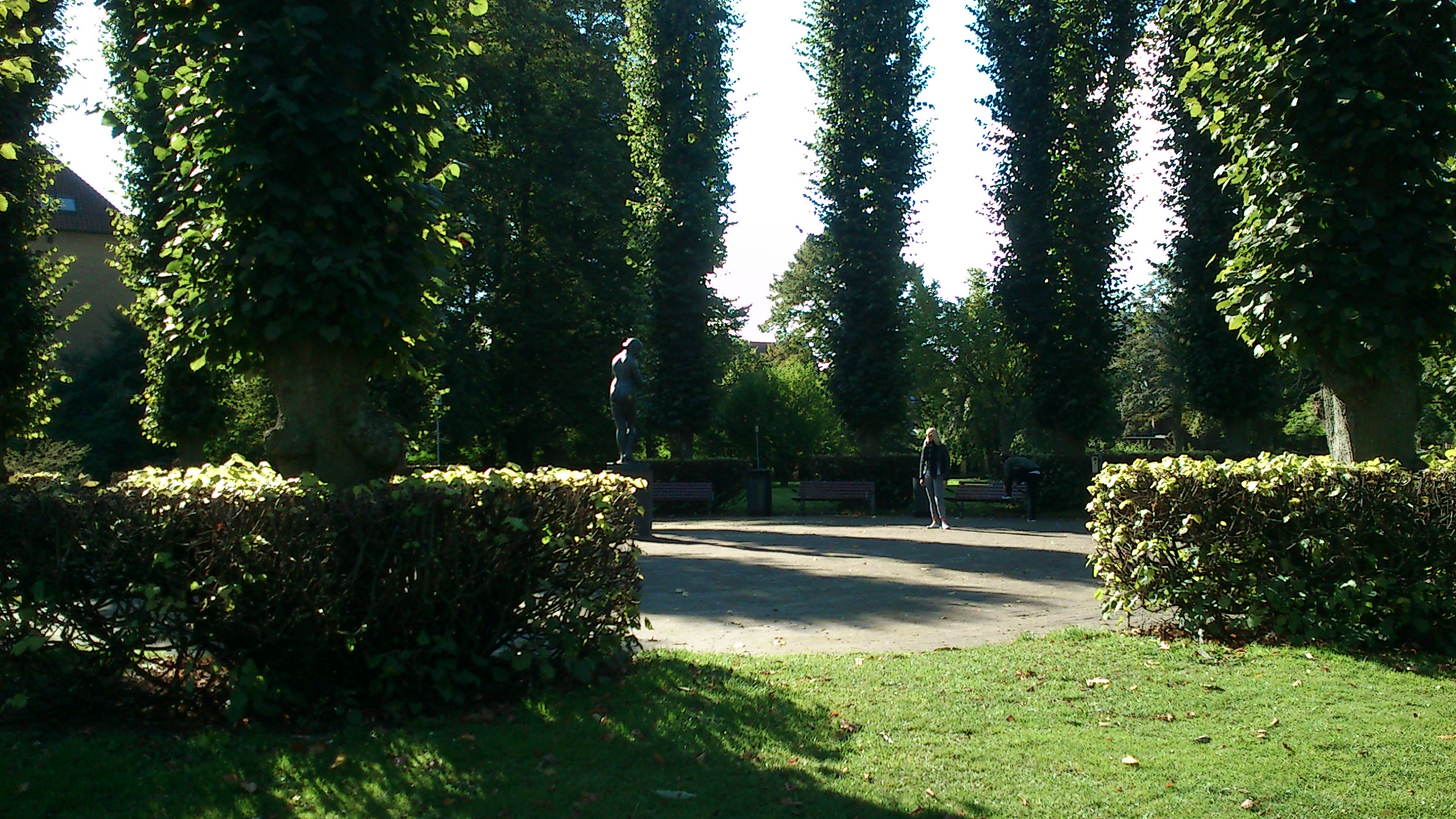
A cobbled plaza in the park.

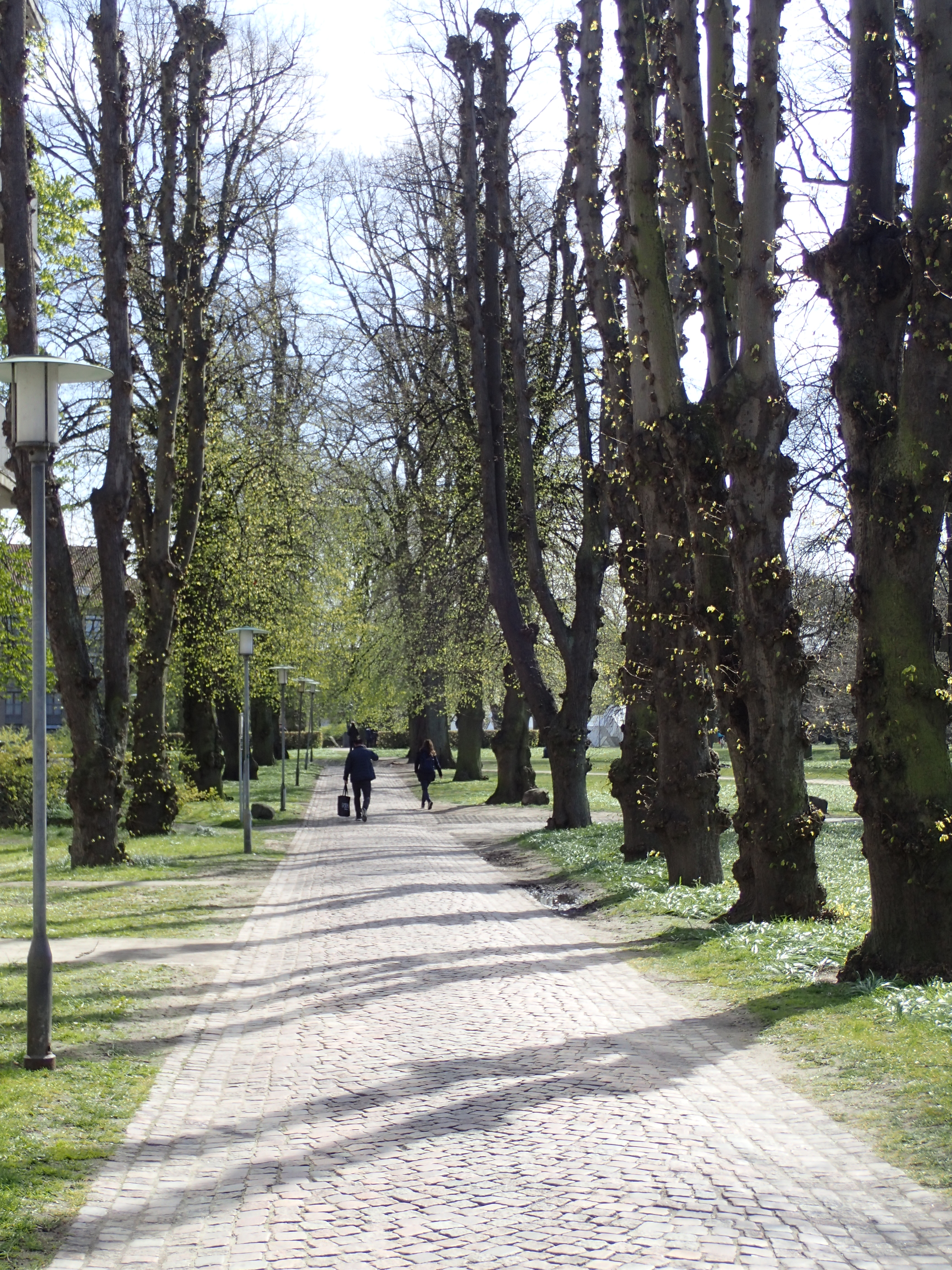
The linden tree avenue leading to the City Hall Square.

The City Hall Square
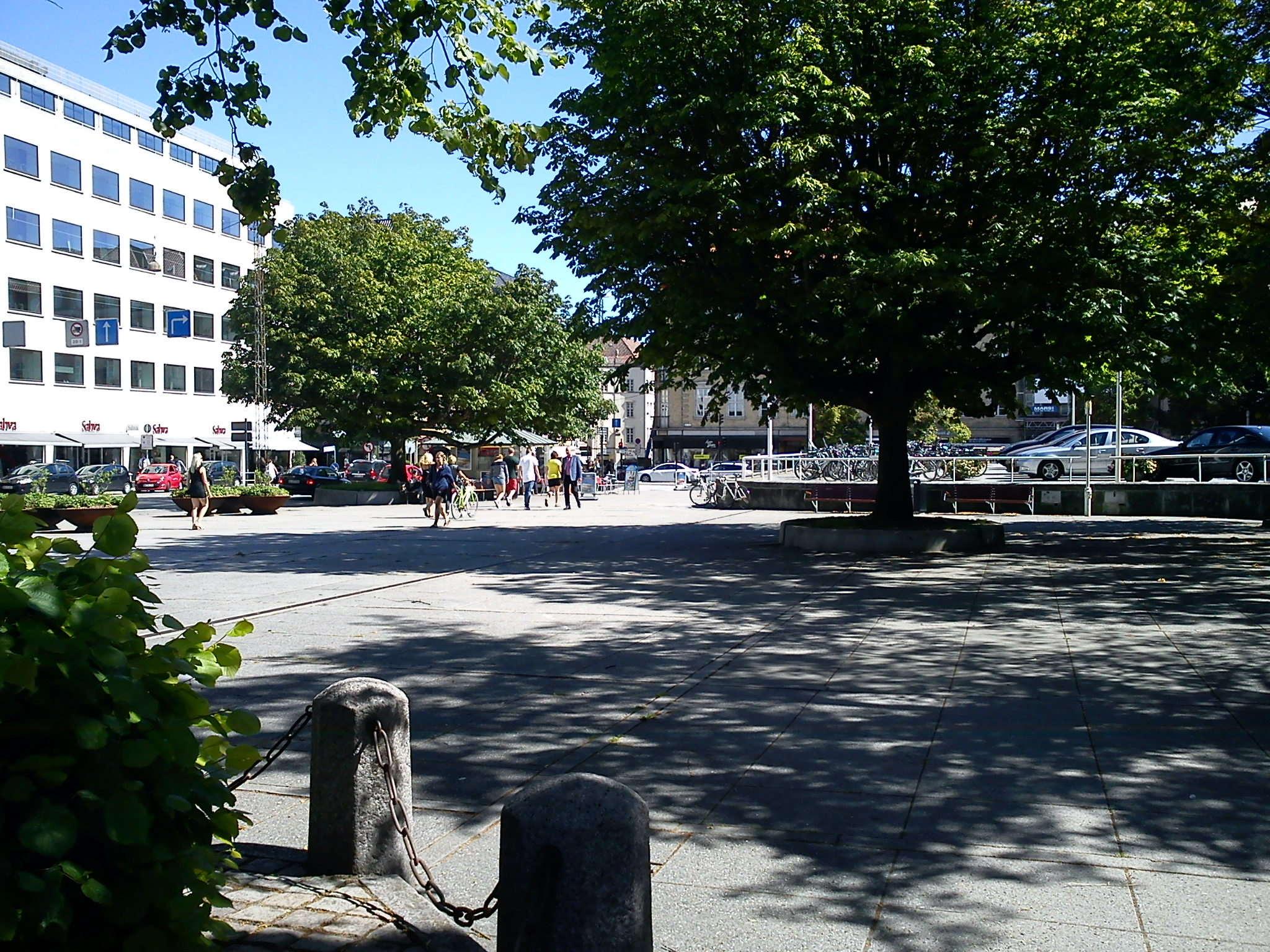
Rådhuspladsen (The City Hall Square)

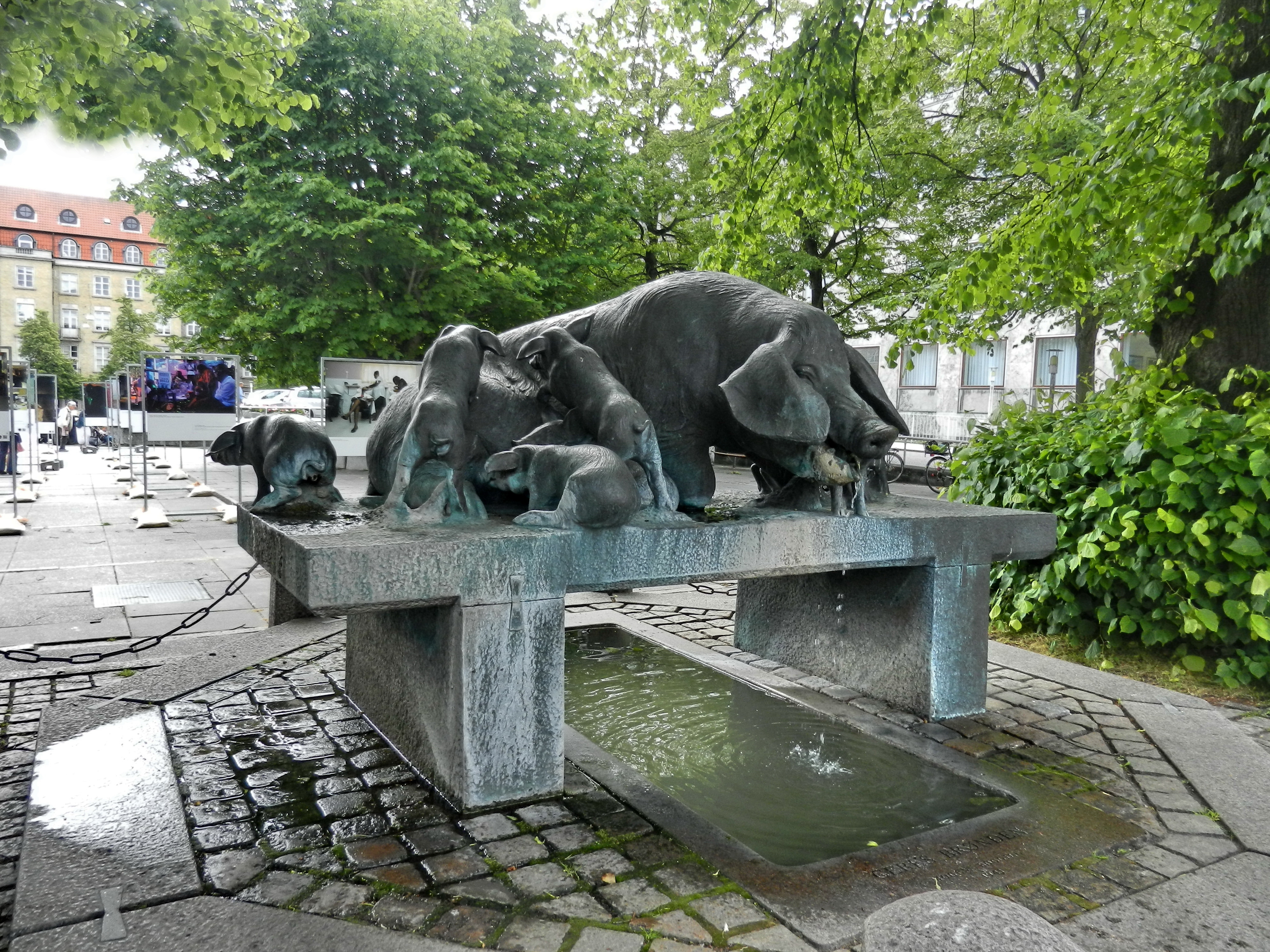
Pig sculpture and fountain, known as Ceres Brønden

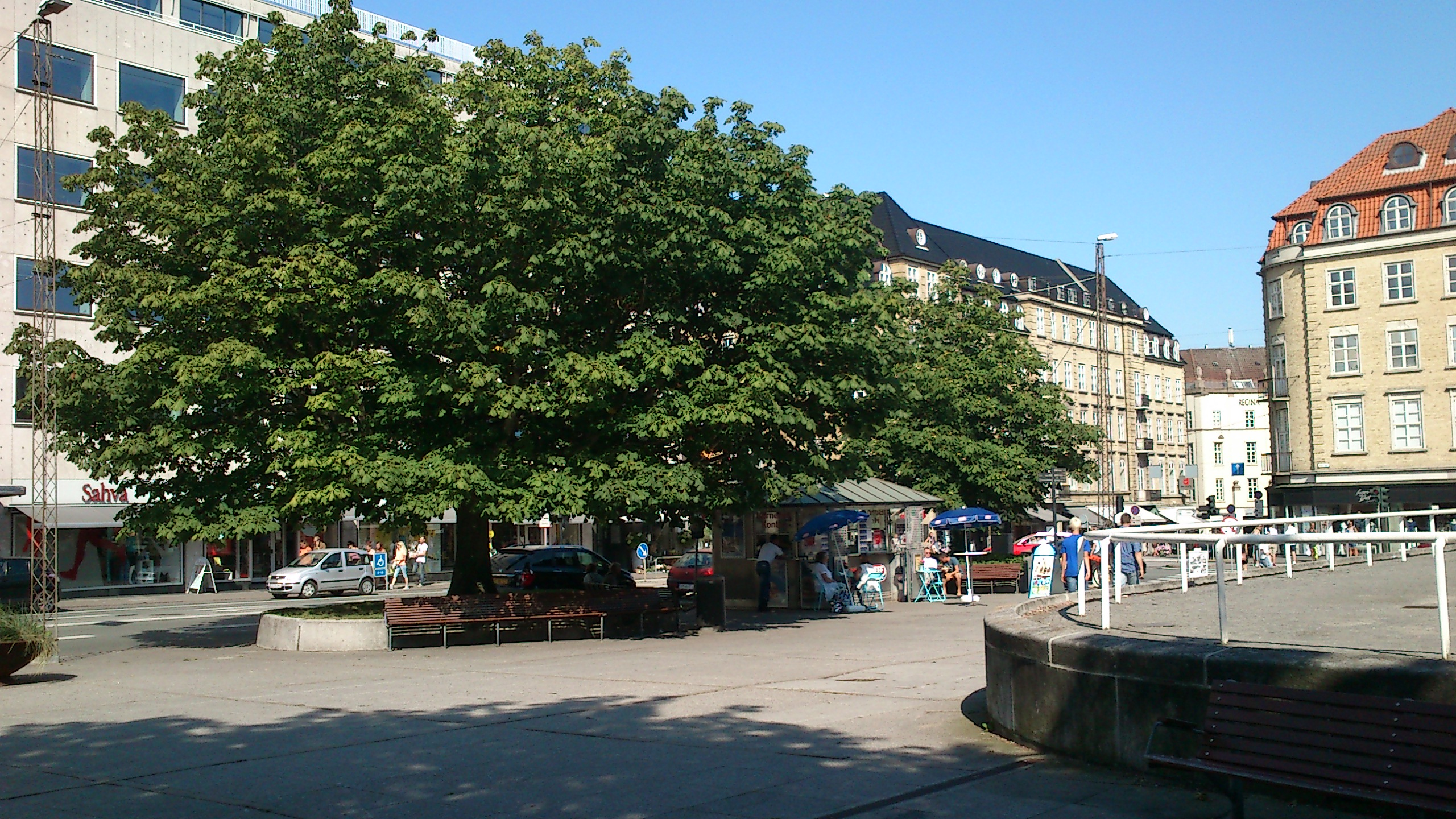
The pølsevogn at The City Hall Square

== Sources ==
- Byens hus, Erhvervsarkivet 1991 ISBN 87-89386-22-1
