= Banegårdsplads, Aarhus =

Public square in Aarhus, Denmark

Banegårdsplads
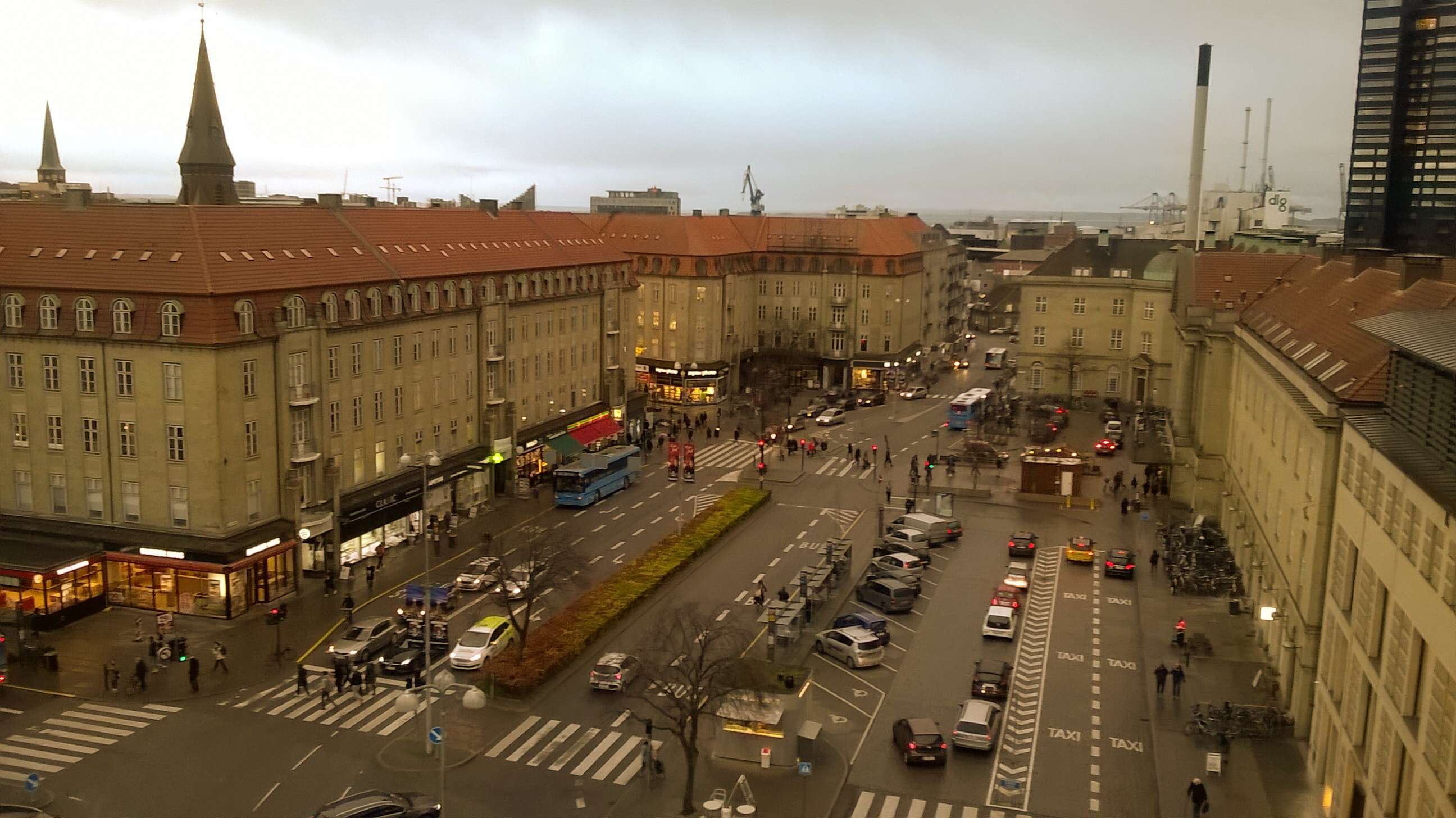
- Banegårdsplads in Aarhus (2018)
- Length: 120 m (390 ft)
- Location: Indre By, Aarhus, Denmark
- Postal code: 8000
- Coordinates: 56°09′02.2″N 10°12′15.2″E

Banegårdsplads (Lit. Central Station Square) is a public square in Aarhus, Denmark, situated in the Indre By neighborhood. Banegårdsplads is where arrivals from the Aarhus Central Station enters the city and it functions as a central junction for the streets Banegårdsgade, Ny Banegårdsgade, M.P. Bruuns Gade, Park Allé and Ryesgade.

== History ==
Banegårdsplads has been reformed and renovated a number of times and the current setup is the 3rd version. The reason for the many changes is that the square has been altered every time a new central station has been built or expanded. The last major overhaul occurred in the 1920s when the area around it was developed following a unified urban planning design by city engineer Oscar Jørgensen and architect Axel Høeg-Hansen. The pair won an architectural competition in 1920 issued by the city council. The central station was finished in 1929 and at that time the construction of buildings in the surrounding areas had begun.

Banegårdsplads has long been a transportation hub in the city. The first four tram lines in the city started here and later it, along with Park Allé, became the central hub for buses. Today the square is the junction for several major streets and contains a parking area for taxis.

== Architecture ==
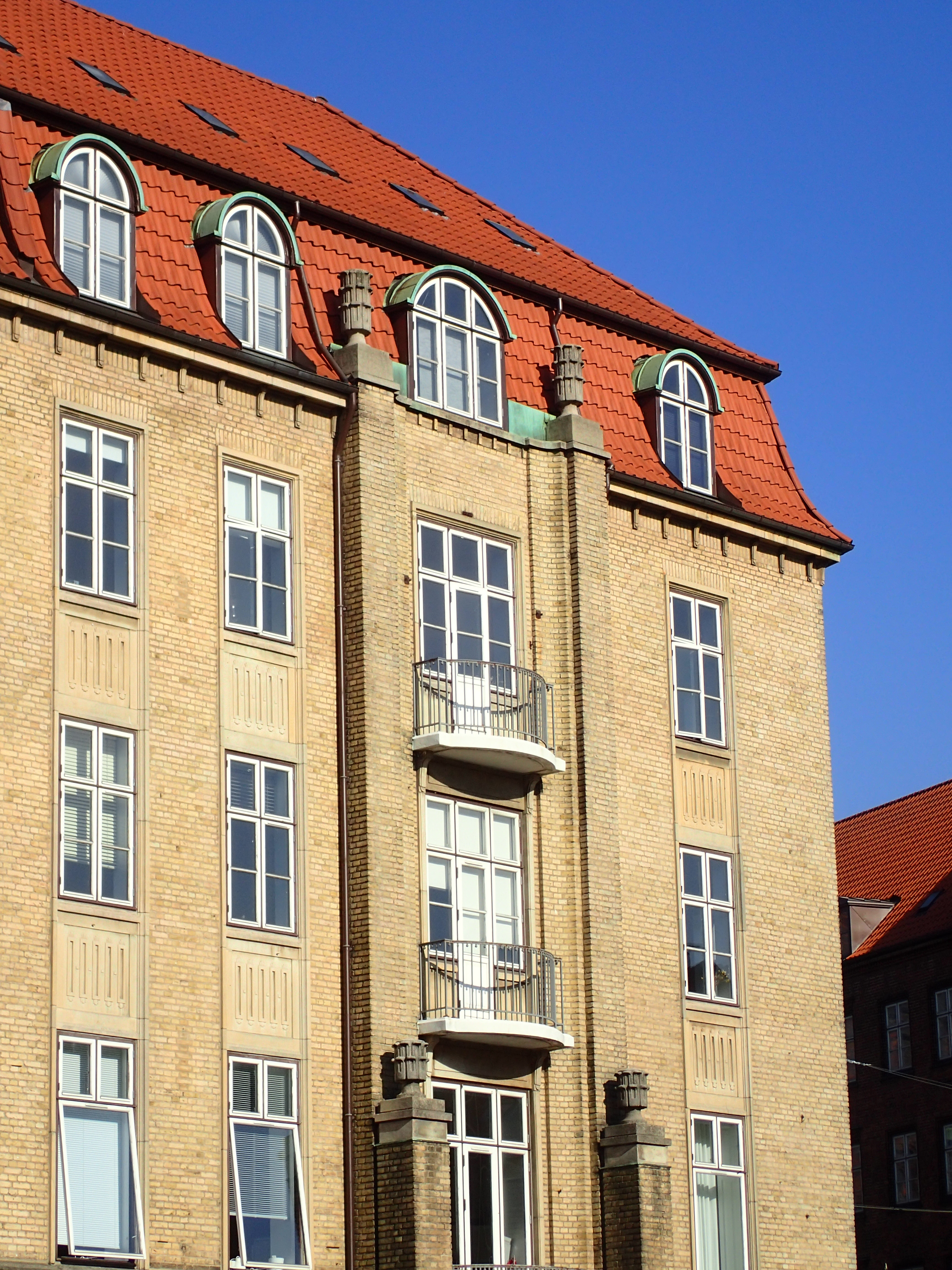
Banegårdsplads is lined with neoclassical structures in yellow brick

The buildings surrounding the square were designed to complement the neoclassical central station constructed between 1926 and 1929. The square is delimited at the east and west ends by large buildings and corners projected forward while the square continues more freely northwards toward Park Allé which today functions as a portal to the City Hall constructed in 1938-41. The buildings around the square have the same heights and are constructed of the same building materials, sand colored yellow bricks with sandstone used for accentuation. Apart from the hip roof of the central station all buildings have mansard roofs with rounded dormers.

The first buildings on the north side of Sønder Allé came to inform the entire construction project; the windows are framed in ashlar and the parapets are formed with brick patterns. The buildings on Park Allé has a strong vertical expression with massive loggia-inspired porches pushed forwards from the main buildings which function as a counterweight to the length of the block. The ground floor is accentuated with horizontal brick patterns, almost a reversed shadow joint, to underline to solid character of the buildings. On Banegårdspladsen the vertical expression is different with brick columns around the main entrances which is also seen in the older Regina complex. The windows are framed in narrow lesenes and the cornices of sandstone are carried by corbels.

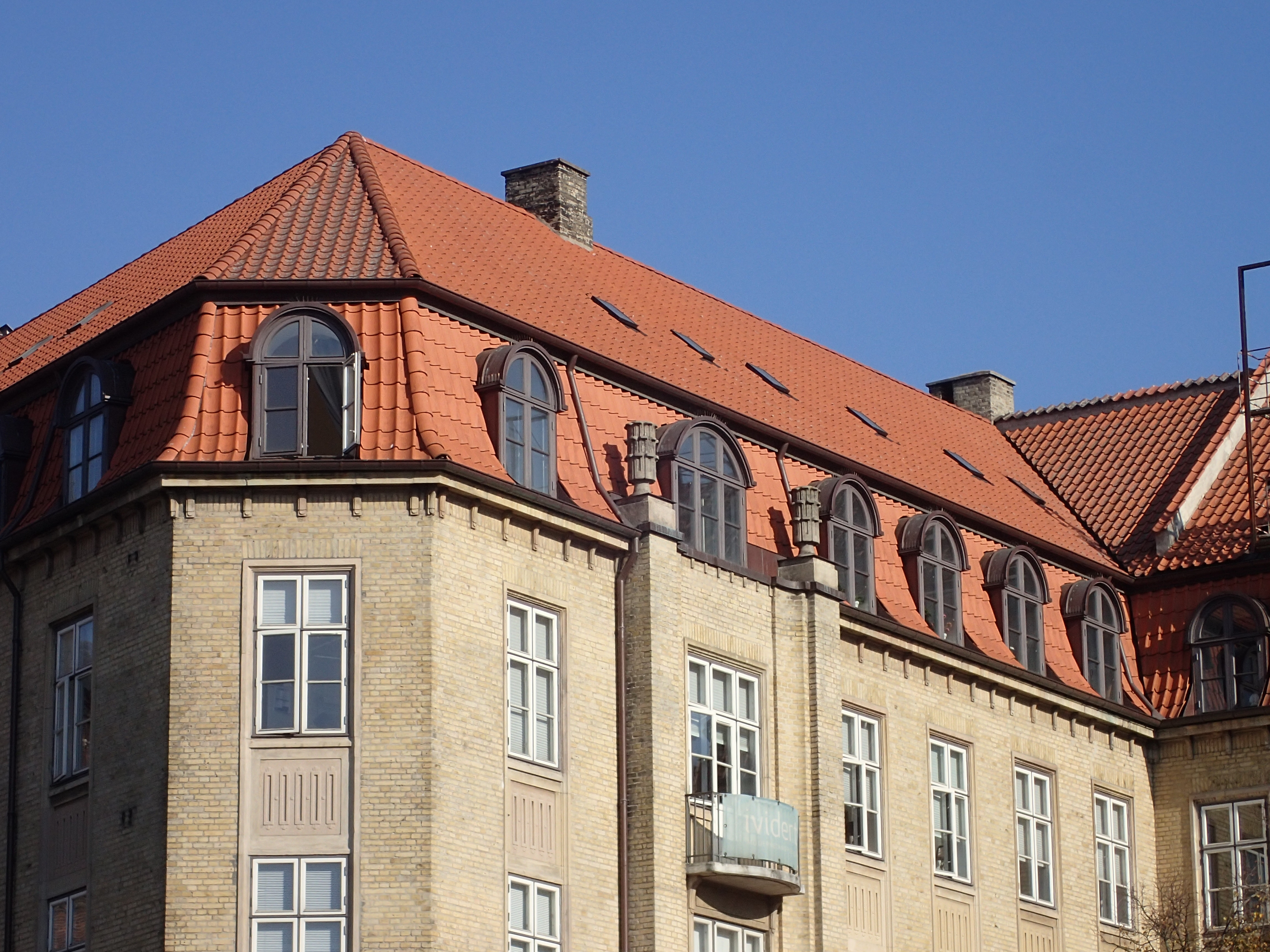
Neoclassical architecture in yellow brick

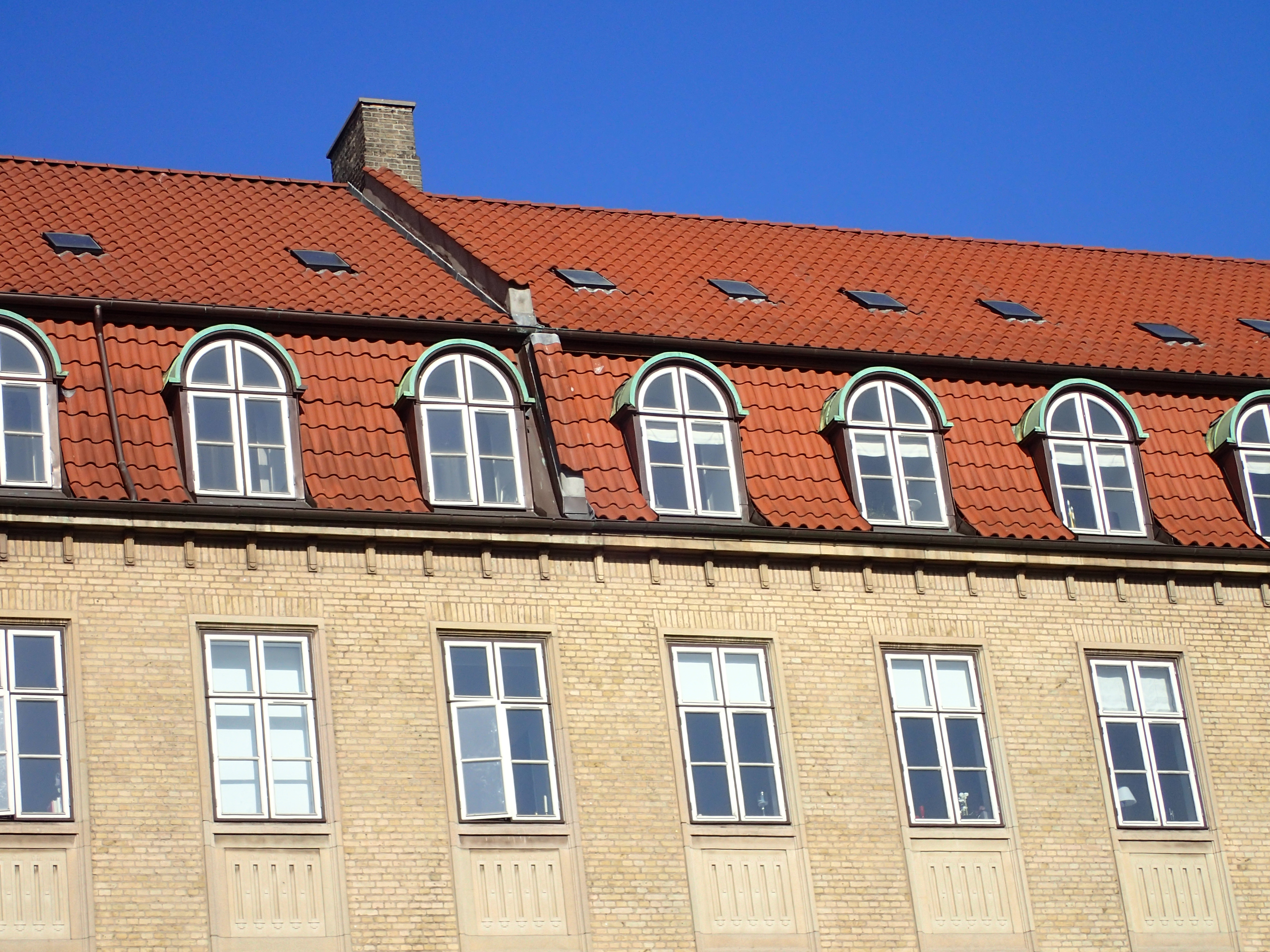
facade detail

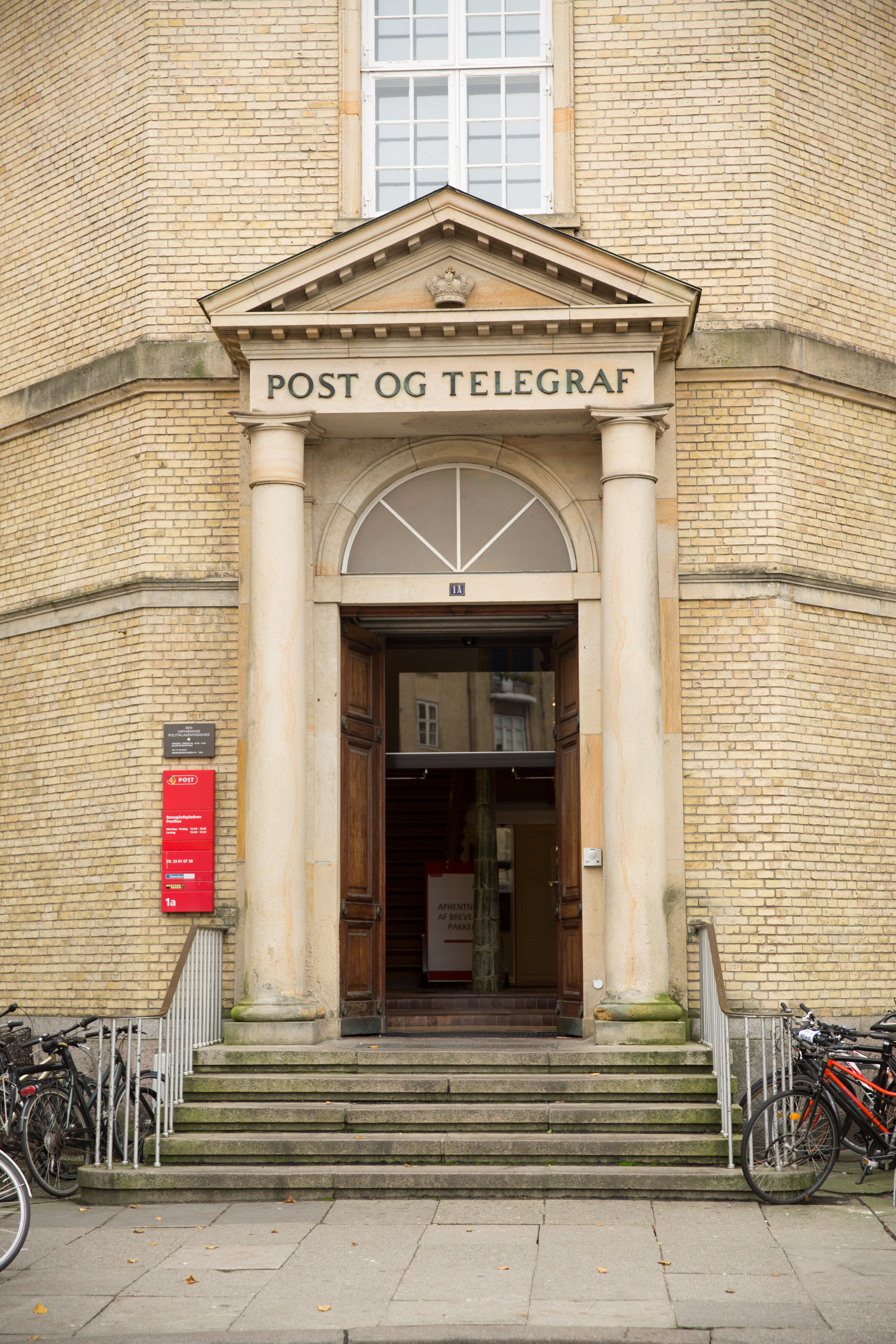
Former post and telegraph center

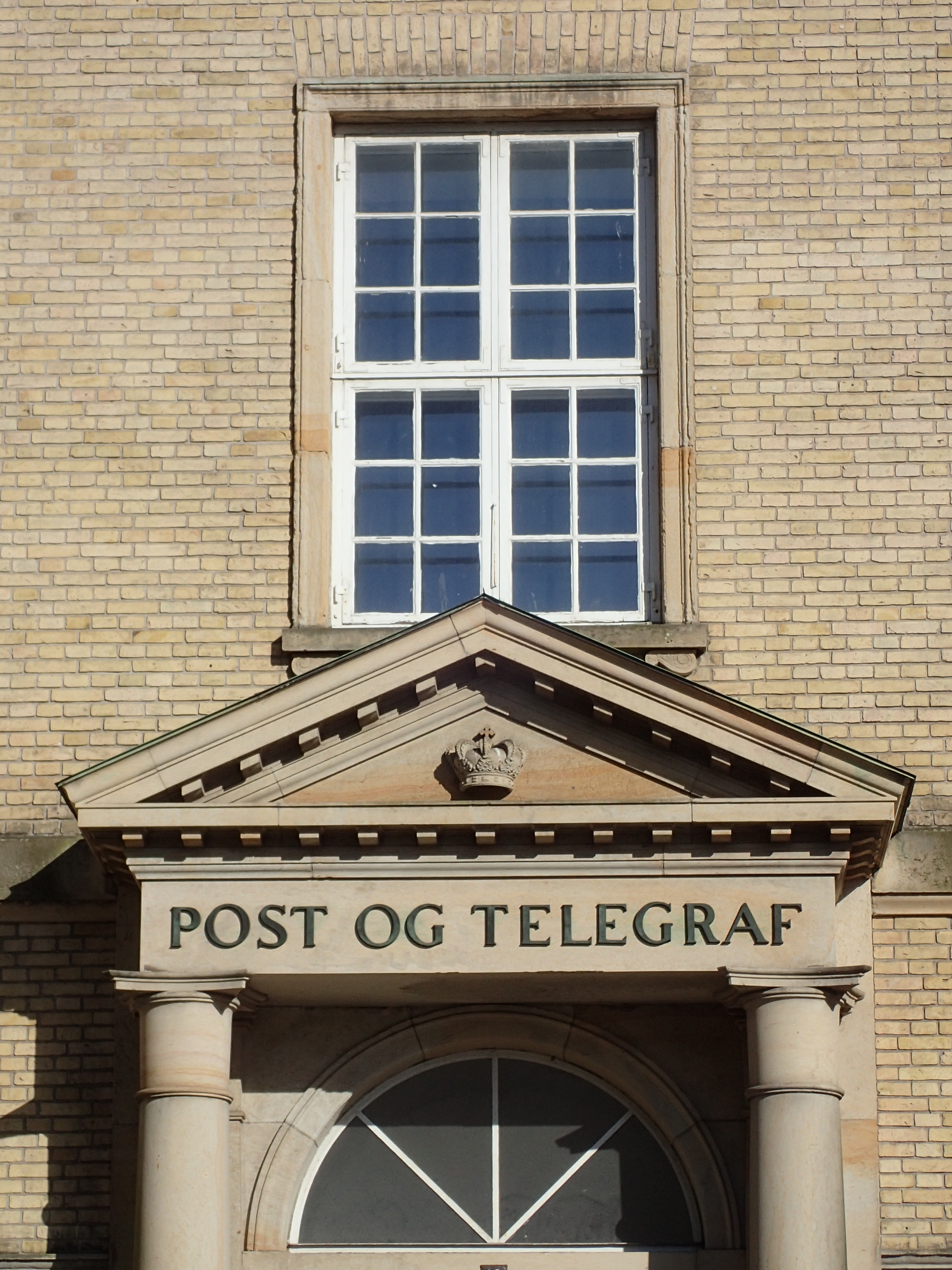
Architectural detail

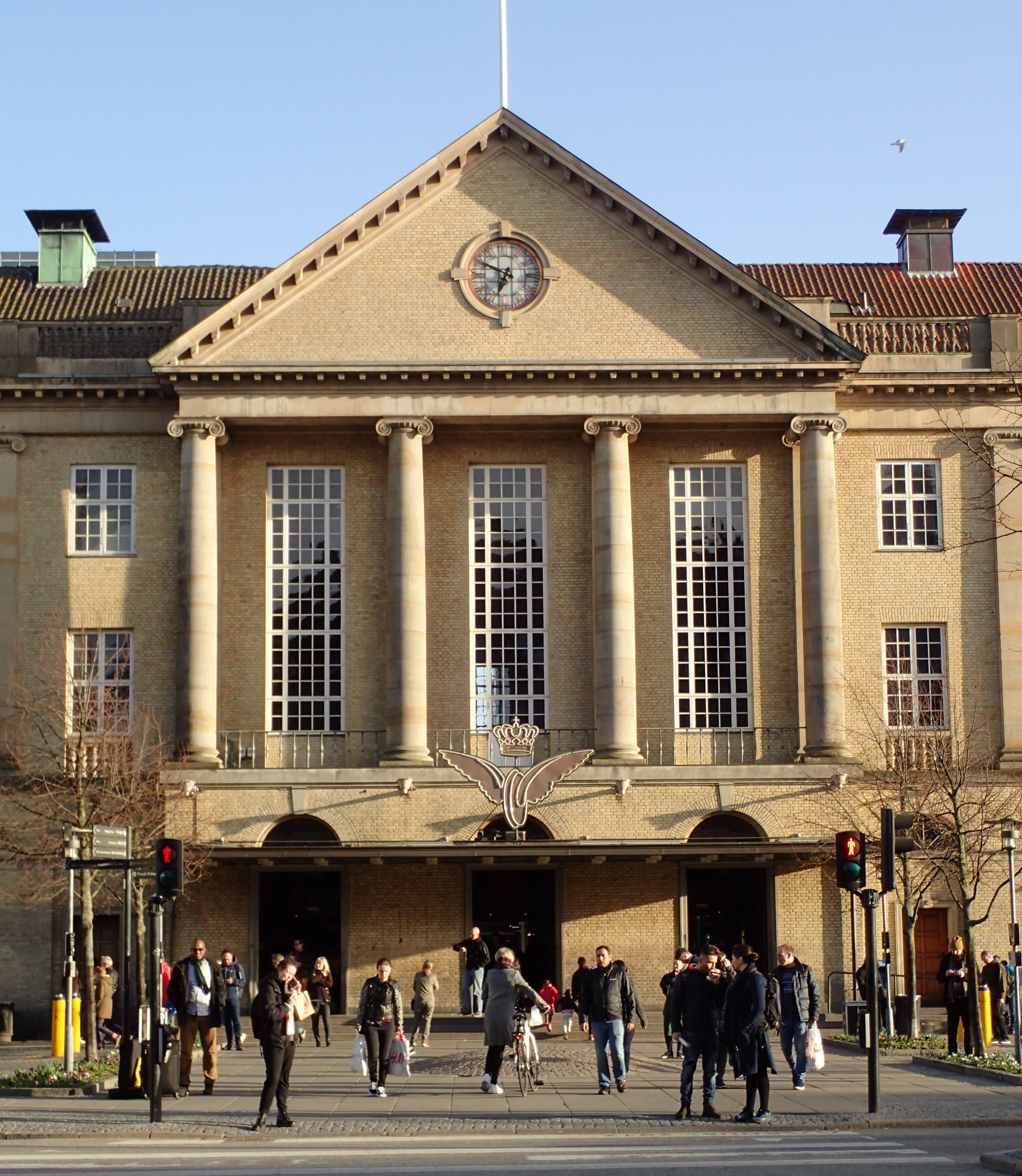
Aarhus Central Station in yellow brick

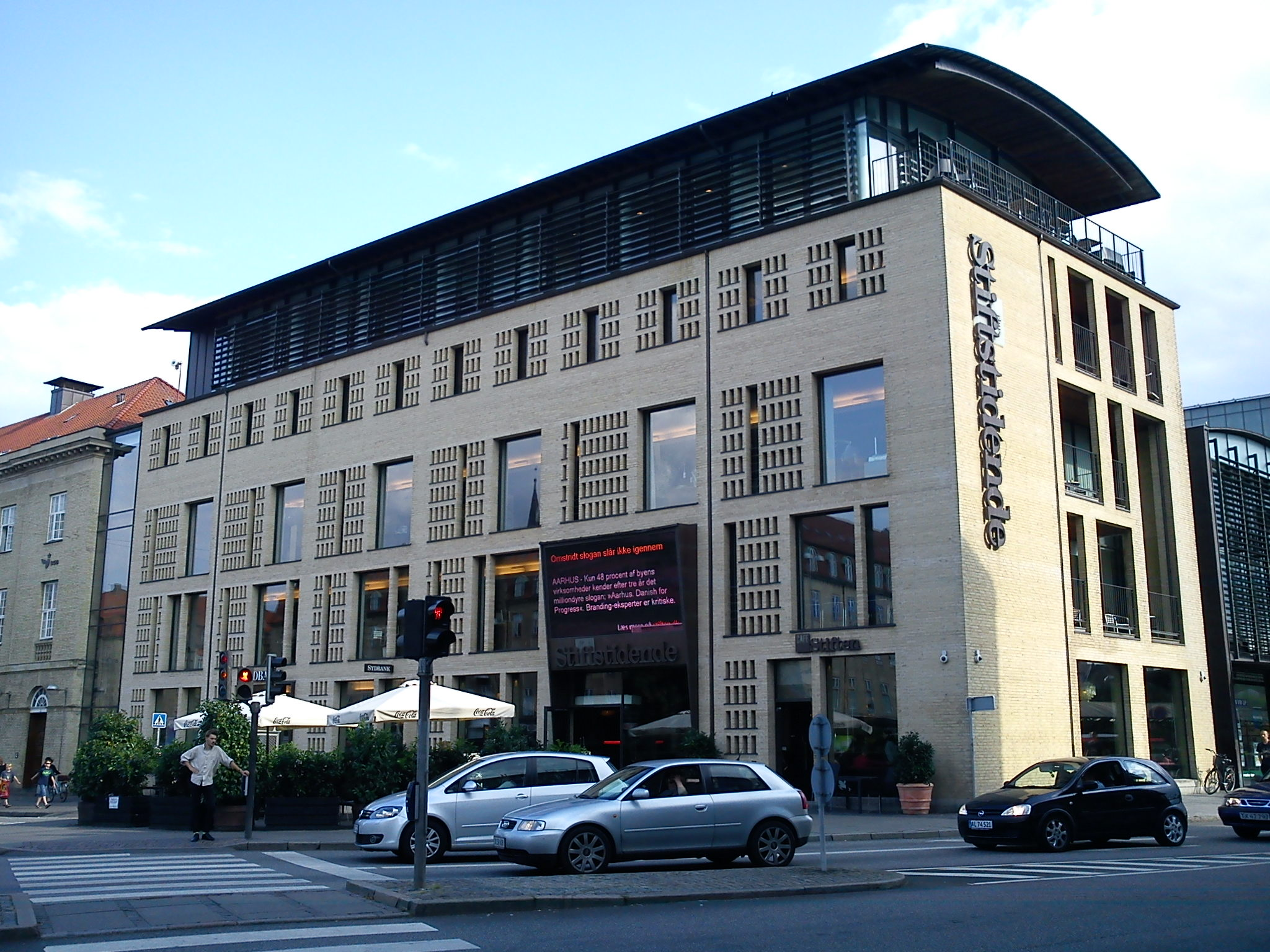
Banegårdshuset (newspaper headquarters) in yellow brick
