= Theodora Allen =

American visual artist

- Born: 1985 (age 40–41); Los Angeles, California, U.S.
- Education: University of California, Los Angeles (MFA)
- Known for: Painting
- Website: BLUM Gallery

Theodora Allen (born 1985, Los Angeles) is an American visual artist.

== Education and career ==
Theodora Allen was born in Los Angeles, California, in 1985. She earned an MFA from the University of California, Los Angeles (UCLA) in 2014. She has been represented by Blum & Poe, Los Angeles, Kasmin, New York, and 12.26, Dallas. Her work has been included in exhibitions at the Driehaus Museum, Chicago, Kunsthal Aarhus, Denmark, the Kemper Museum of Contemporary Art, Kansas City, and the Museum of Contemporary Art, Tucson, as well as galleries including Sprüth Magers, Almine Rech, Nicolai Wallner, Jeffrey Deitch, and Berggruen Gallery.

In 2013, Allen collaborated with fashion house Saint Laurent, under Hedi Slimane, creating an artist book titled 49 Paintings that served as an invitation to the Fall/Winter 2013 women’s ready-to-wear show.

In 2021, Allen’s monograph Saturnine was published by Motto Books, documenting her exhibition at Kunsthal Aarhus, Denmark, which later traveled to the Driehaus Museum, Chicago.

== Select exhibitions ==
- Saturnine (2021), Kunsthal Aarhus, Denmark
- Gimlet Eye (2022), Huset for Kunst & Design, Holstebro, Denmark
- Saturnine (2022), Driehaus Museum, Chicago, Illinois

== Critical reception ==
Allen's work has been the subject of reviews, interviews, and critical coverage in international art publications, including ArtReview, Mousse Magazine, Art in America, Artnet, ARTnews, and The New York Times.
