= Ryesgade, Aarhus =

Street in Aarhus, Denmark

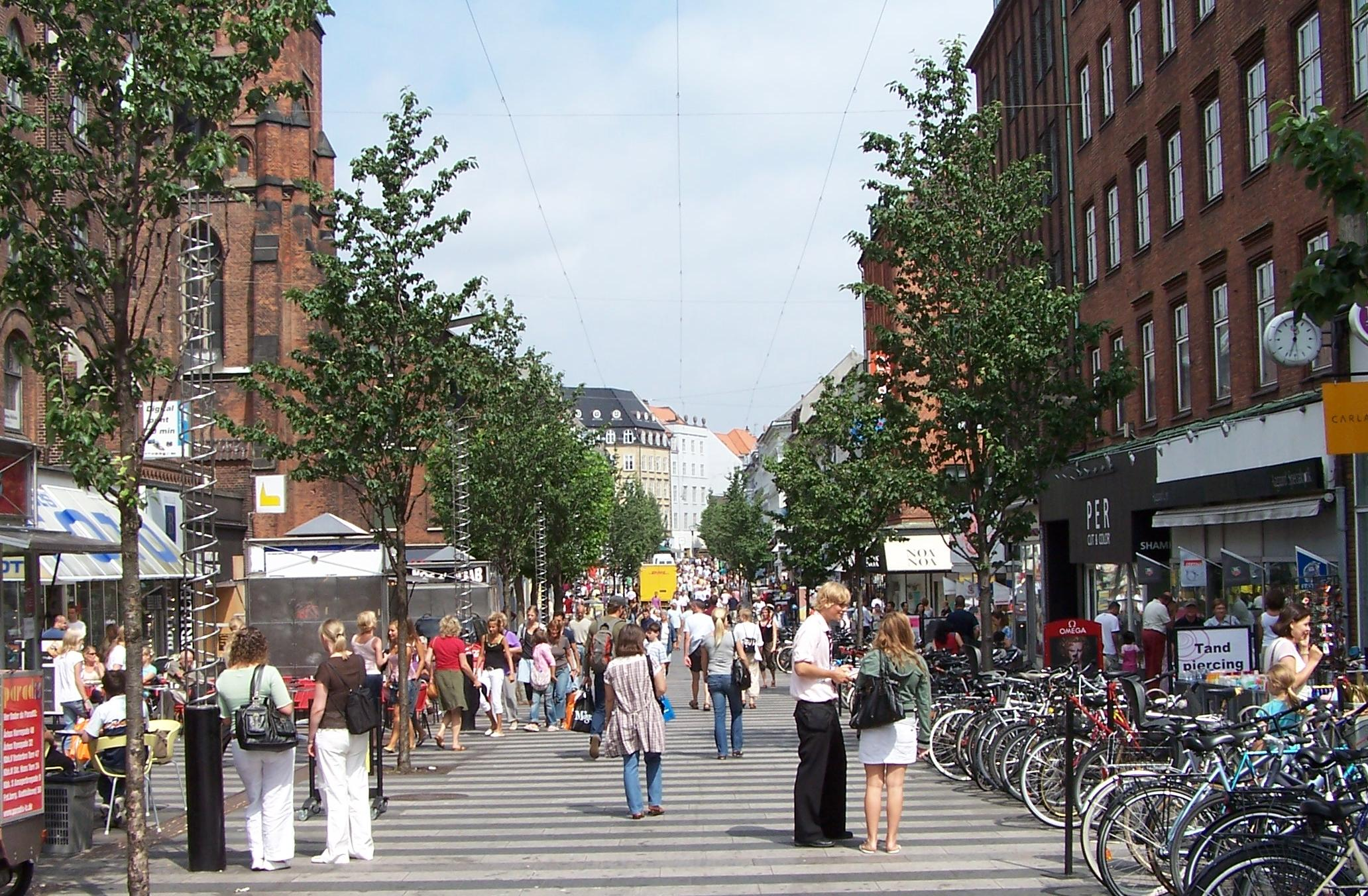
- Ryesgade
- Native name: Ryesgade, Strøget (Danish)
- Length: 240 m (790 ft)
- Location: Town Center, Aarhus, Denmark
- Postal code: 8000
- Coordinates: 56°09′06.9″N 10°12′17.9″E

Ryesgade is a 240-meter-long street in Aarhus, Denmark. It is located in the central Town Center neighborhood and runs south to north from Banegårdspladsen to Søndergade and provides access to Rosenkrantzgade. Ryesgade is today one the busiest commercial pedestrianized streets in Denmark. It was created in 1873 as an extension to Søndergade to connect the Central Station to the rest of the inner city. Ryesgade is one of several streets in Denmark named for the Danish general Olaf Rye who became famous for his exploits during the First Schleswig War.

Ryesgade is part of the 750 meters long pedestrian zone Strøget which runs from Aarhus Central Station to Aarhus Cathedral, consisting of the streets Søndergade, St. Clemens Street and Ryesgade.

== History ==
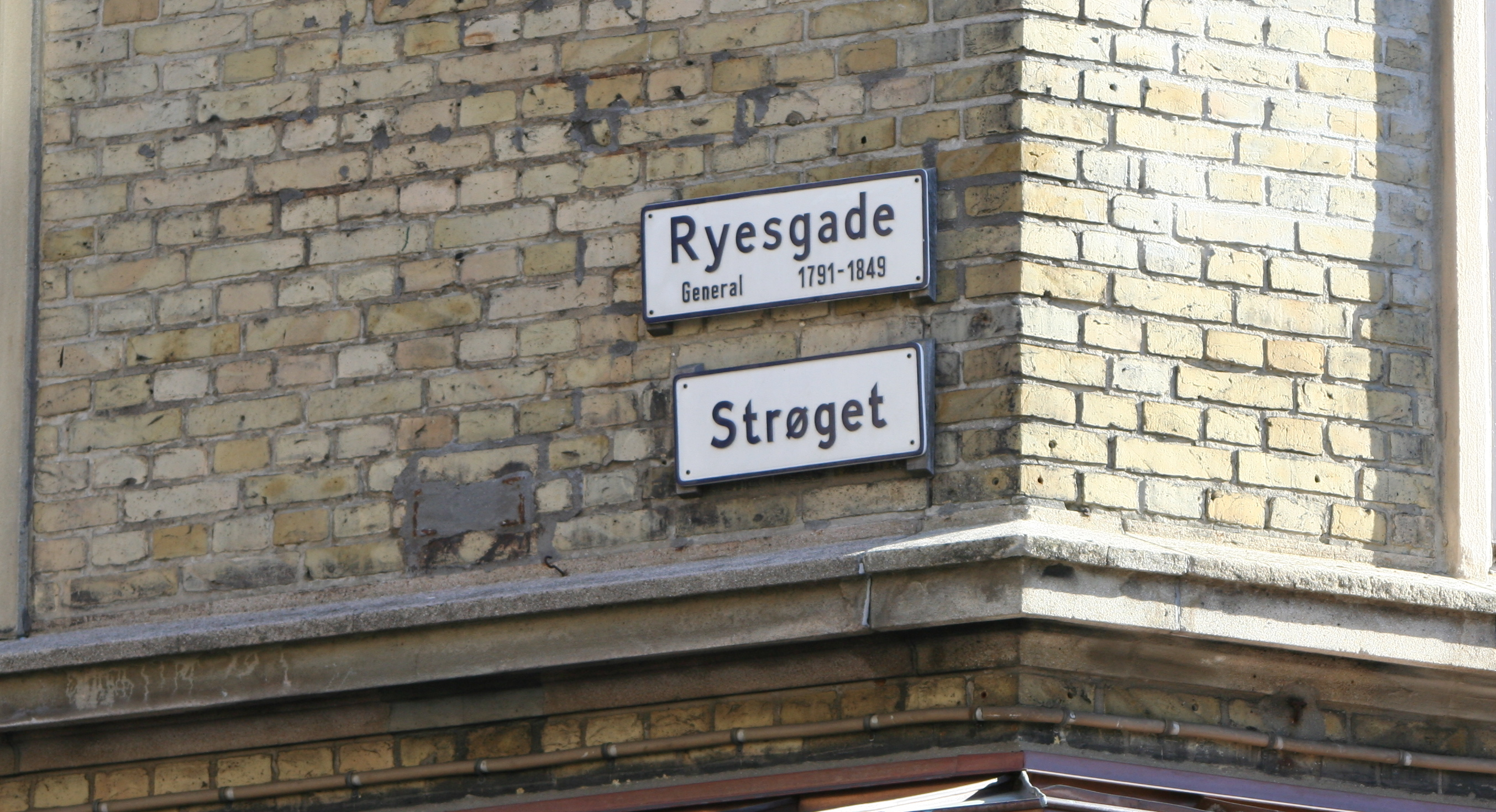
Streetsigns: Ryesgade and Strøget

In the 1850s, Sændergade was being developed from the Aarhus River near the cathedral to Sønder Allé but the last stretch to the Central Station was only served by a small path going through a plant nursery. The city council was aware the area would eventually be incorporated in the city and in 1869 it sent a letter to the Danish Ministry of the Interior pointing out which areas south of the city were best suited for development. This included the plant nursery, which was owned but leased out by the city, and Amtsmandstoften to the east, owned by Aarhus County. In the early 1870s, the city council established a committee to review parceling and development of the plant nursery and on 14 March 1872 it presented its findings to the city council. It was decided to establish a wide street from the open square Banegårdspladsen in front of the central station to Søndergade.

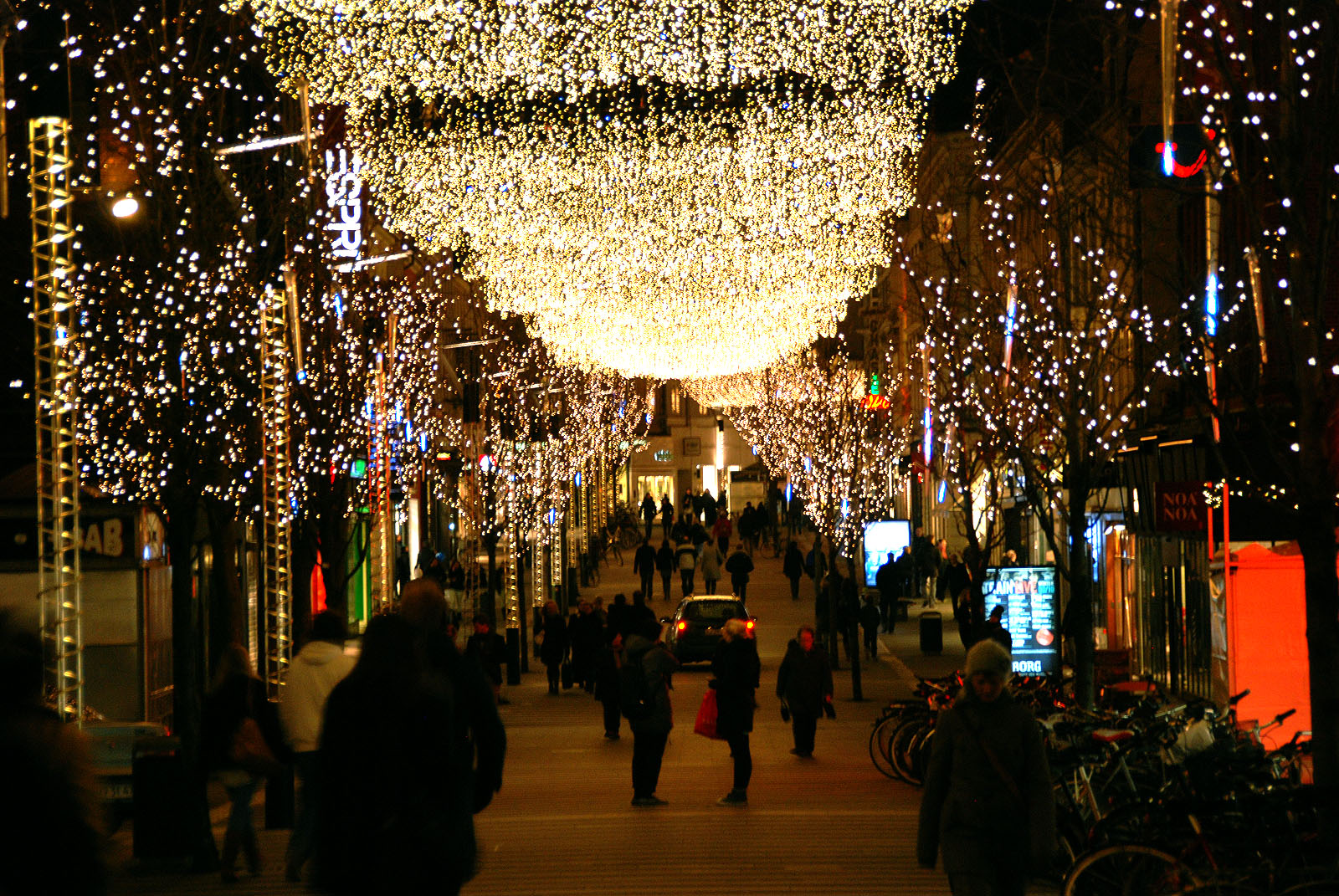
Strøget (Ryesgade) decorated for Christmas.

Through the later 1870s, the street was developed, adjoining parcels sold off and new buildings erected. The final cost to the city was 13.600 rigsdaler and the development proved a profitable to the city as more than 50.000 sq alen were parceled off for 1 rigsdaler per alen while the city had only collected 160 rigsdaler in taxes from the former plant nursery. The first years traffic to Store Torv still went through Fredensgade and Skolegade but when St. Clemens Bridge opened in 1884 Ryesgade and Søndergade became the main thoroughfare connecting the central station and the newly developing neighborhood Frederiksbjerg south of it to the old city center north of the river. In 1904 the first electrical tram system was put in.

Ryesgade lies on the southern slope of a tunnel valley that runs through the central part of the city. The first years this meant the street was steep and difficult for horse draw carriages to navigate. In the 1920s, it was decided to level the area in front of the central railway station which was to be raised the equivalent of one floor from its previous height. During the lengthy construction period access to Ryesgade was restricted by a large height differential and traffic started moving along the newly developed Park Allé instead. In 1929, construction was completed and buildings along the upper third of Ryesgade had been demolished and rebuilt in order to make the street level with Banegårdspladsen. In the following decades Aarhus kept expanding, especially to the south, and Ryesgade developed into a central and busy commercial street.

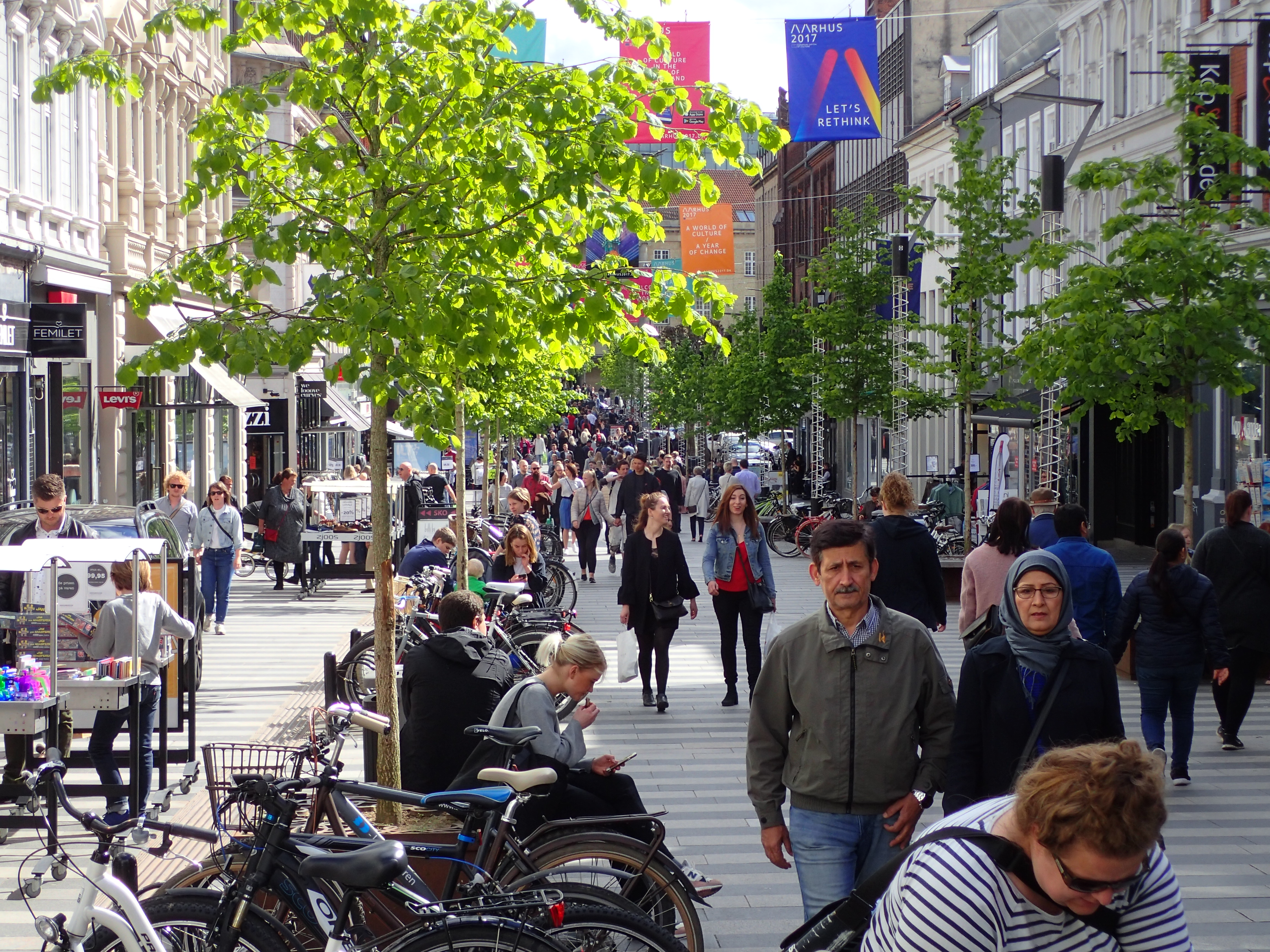
The high street is busy with pedestrians

In the 1970s, pedestrianized streets began appearing across Europe and in Copenhagen it was decided to turn Strøget into a pedestrian zone. In Aarhus it was decided to turn Søndergade into a pedestrian street but in Ryesgade store owners objected, fearing loss of revenue with the absence of cars. On 7 November 1971, the last trams drove through the street and over the following years Søndergade was renovated and had new paving stones put in. Turning Søndergade into a pedestrian street proved a success, attracting more shoppers and visitors. On 1 May 1974, Ryesgade was turned into a "half-pedestrian street", allowing only for one way traffic. This setup lasted for almost 30 years until the late 1990s.

At the turn of the millennium, the local shopkeepers association of Ryesgadeforeningen, contacted the city council and requested Ryesgade also be turned into a pedestrian street. The paving was at the time worn out and it was decided to renovate the entire length of Strøget from the Central Station to the cathedral. From 2001 to 2002, Søndergade and Skt. Clemens Square were renovated and Ryesgade was closed off to car traffic, thus creating a 750 meters long pedestrian street known as Strøget. Today, Strøget has about 47,000 visitors on a daily basis and some 14 million visitors annually, placing it among the busiest commercial streets in Denmark.

== Notable buildings ==
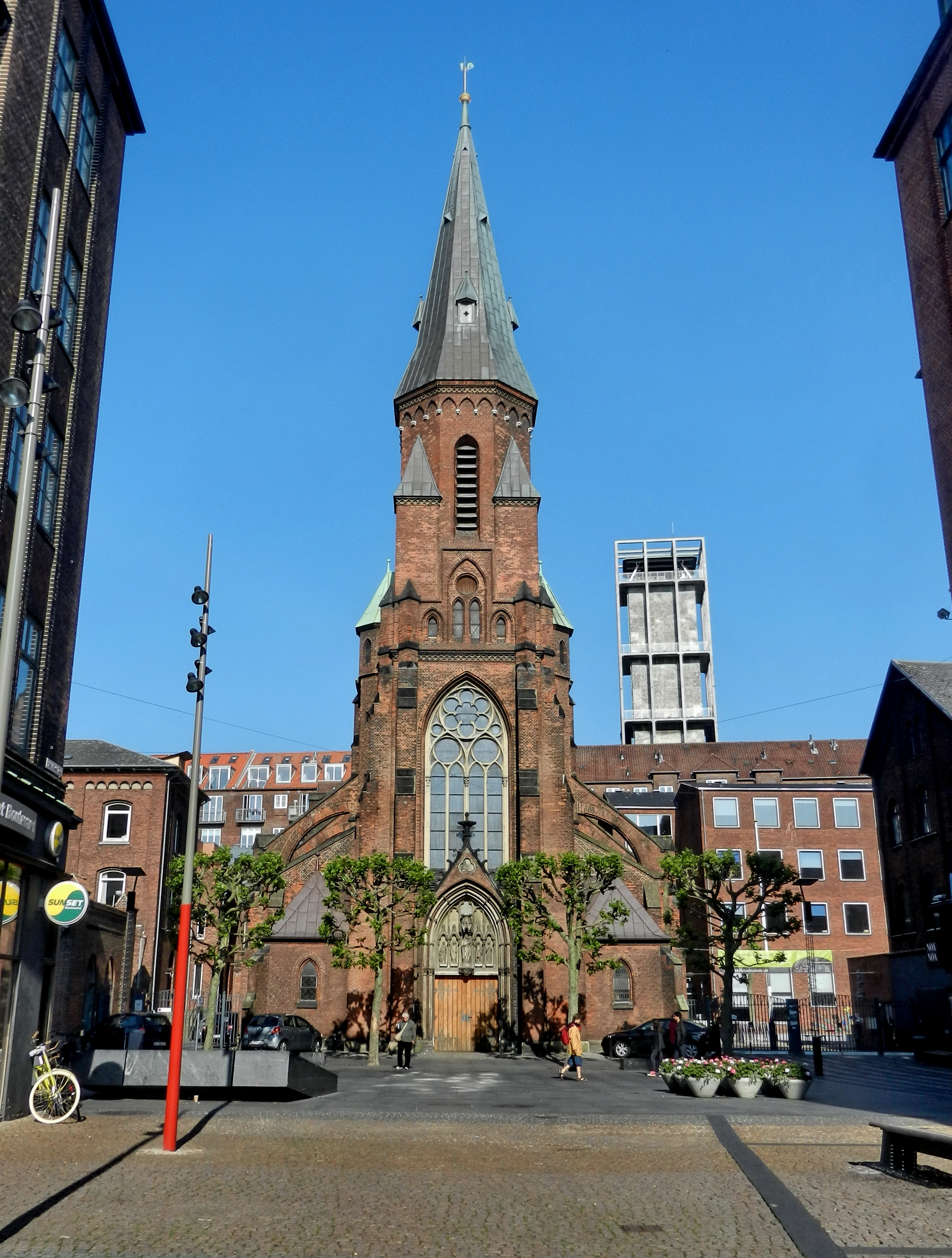
The Catholic Vor Frue Kirke (Our Lady Church) at the square of Sankt Knuds Torv, built in 1880.

The Catholic Church of Our Lady is the most prominent building in the street. Designed in Gothic Revival architecture by the German architect Frantz Schmitz who had worked on the recently completed Cologne Cathedral. Associated with the church is a Catholic school. In 1938, Aarhus Hallen (The Aarhus Hall) was built in Ryesgade and for a number of years it was a central fixture in the social and cultural life of the city, hosting events from concerts to sporting events.
