= Catholic Church of Our Lady (Aarhus) =

- Katolsk Vor Frue Kirke
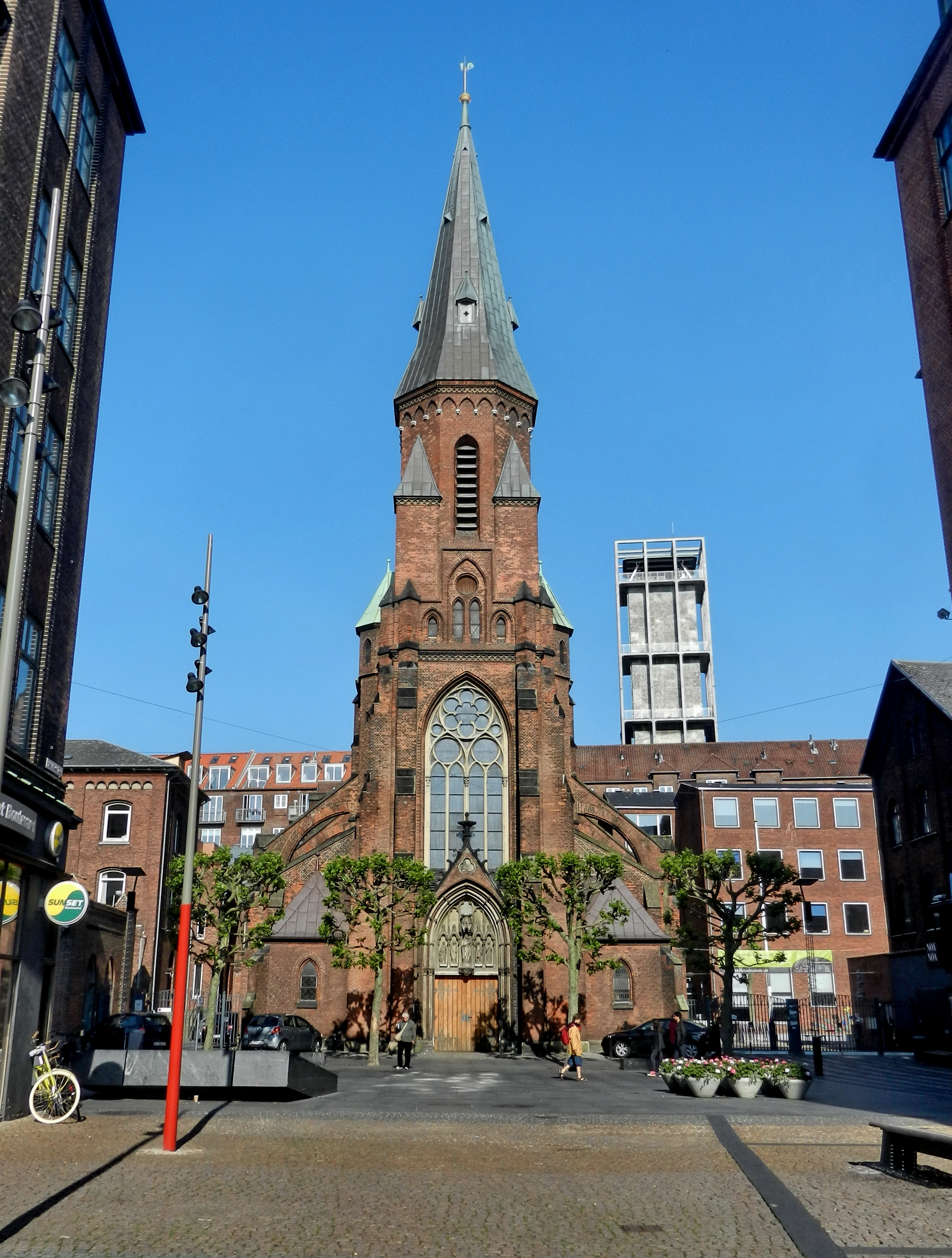
- Catholic Church of Our Lady seen from St. Knud's Square
- Catholic Church of Our Lady
- 56.1515°N 10.2045°E
- Location: Ryesgade 26; 8000 Aarhus C
- Country: Denmark
- Denomination: Catholic Church
- Sui iuris church: Latin Church

History
- Status: Parish church

Architecture
- Functional status: Active
- Architects: Frantz Schmitz; Carl R. Frederiksen
- Architectural type: Gothic Revival
- Completed: 1880

Specifications
- Materials: Brick

Administration
- Diocese: Copenhagen

Catholic Church of Our Lady (Danish: Katolsk Vor Frue Kirke) is a church in Aarhus, Denmark. The church is situated in the central Indre By neighbourhood on the pedestrian street Ryesgade, close to the Central Station and City Hall. It is a Catholic Church within the Diocese of Copenhagen; built between 1877 and 1880 by designs of the German architect Franz Schmitz and later renovated by the architect Carl R. Frederiksen. The church has seating for 500 people.

The congregation is the largest Catholic congregation in Denmark consisting of some 3500 members from 89 different countries. Especially Vietnam is well-represented but also Iraq, Poland, Chile and Germans.

== History ==
The church can be traced back to the Catholic mission established in Aarhus in 1873. The mission very quickly began planning for a church as a center for worship and other activities and the priest Augustin Sträter acquired a plot of land which at the time lay on the outskirts of the city on a grassy field. It was decided to erect the new church as quickly as possible and work on the foundation commenced before architects or builders had been hired. Sträter travelled to Cologne in Germany to find a suitable architect for the project. Cologne Cathedral was at the time nearing completion as the largest Gothic cathedral in the world and Sträter managed to hire the architect Frantz Schmitz who had contributed to it.

== Architecture ==
The Gothic style was popular and frequently used for new church buildings. The Catholic Church of Our Lady was designed in a form of Gothic Revival style with a 53 meters tall tower supported by buttresses and crowned by a slender, verdigris green copper spire. The church is designed with 3 naves and a Gothic vaulted church room 40 meters long and 7 meters wide. The church is richly decorated with stylized greenery, flowers, angels, devils, dragons and birds and has glass mosaics focused on the birth of Jesus Christ. The church was initially fitted with 4 church bells made by the bell founder Edelbrock from southern Germany.

The church was designed to rise high above the low buildings around it in Ryesgade. The Central Station was built in the 20th century and the area around it was heavily developed with much taller block-style structure. The result is that the church today is wedged between buildings significantly taller than during construction.

== St. Knud's School ==
In conjunction with the ecclesiastical activities, the congregation founded a school in 1875 north of where the church was later built. The school was named St. Knud's School and was managed by Catholic nuns in buildings adjacent to the church.

== See also ==
- Catholic Church in Denmark
- List of churches in Aarhus
- List of Jesuit sites
