= Søndergade, Aarhus =

Street in Aarhus, Denmark

Søndergade
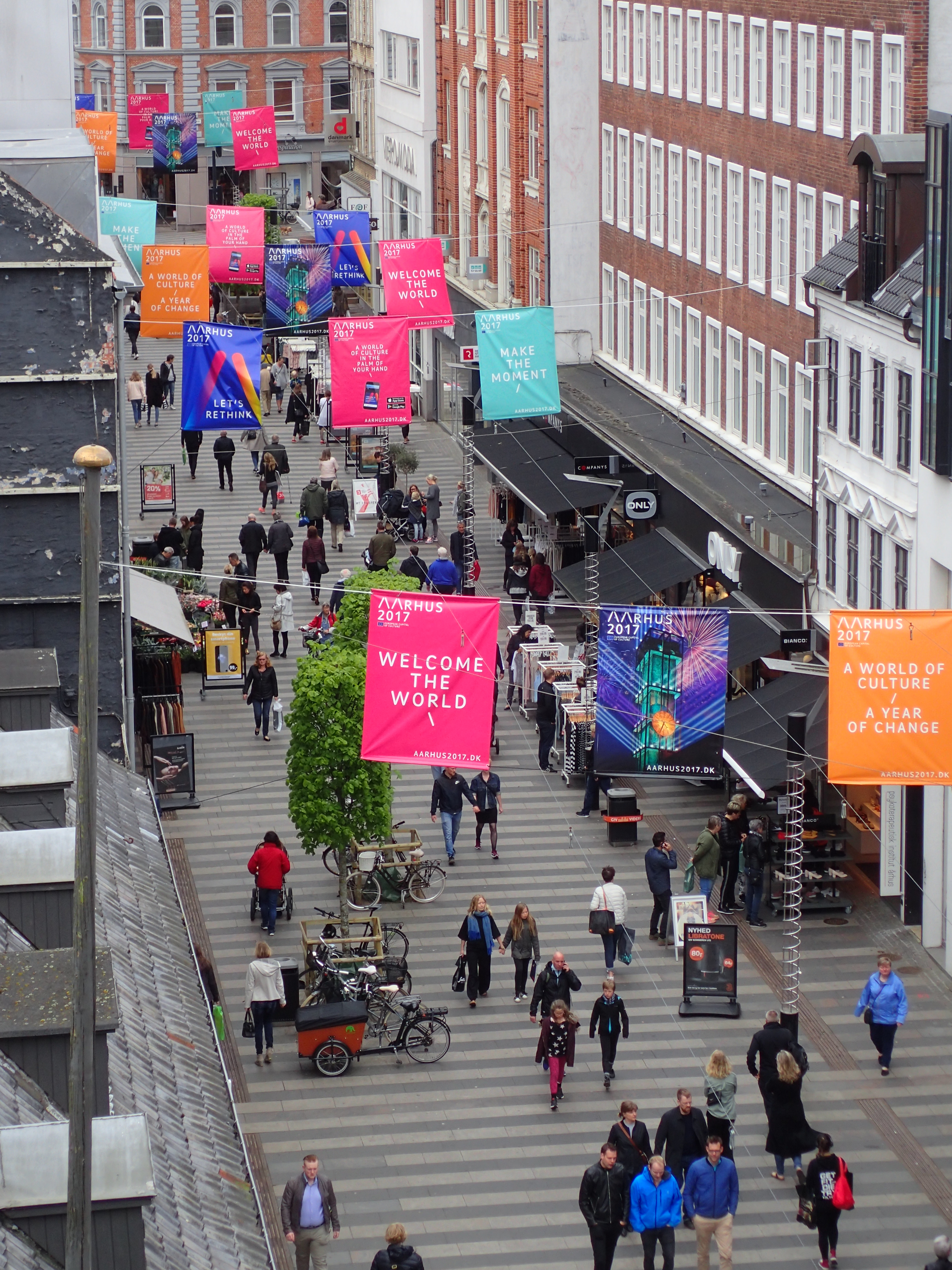
- Søndergade (May 2017)
- Interactive map of Søndergade
- Native name: Søndergade, Strøget (Danish)
- Length: 350 m (1,150 ft)
- Location: Town Center, Aarhus, Denmark
- Postal code: 8000
- Coordinates: 56.154373°N 10.206633°E

Søndergade or Strøget is a street in Aarhus, Denmark. It is located in the inner city neighborhood and runs 350 metres south to north from Ryesgade to Skt. Clemens Stræde and provides access to the alleys Telefonsmøgen and Posthussmøgen. Søndergade was created between 1854 and up through the 1860s as the city expanded southwards following the abolition of octroi and the city walls. The word Sønder is an older Danish form of "south" and the name thus means "Southward-street". Søndergade is part of the 750 meters long shopping street and pedestrian zone Strøget which runs from Aarhus Central Station to Aarhus Cathedral, consisting of the three streets Søndergade, St. Clemens Street and Ryesgade.

== History ==
In 1851 octroi was abolished in Denmark and tolls were no longer collected at the city limits of the market towns, including Aarhus. The walls and city gates were subsequently dismantled and the city had more freedom to grow. The industrialization taking place in the 19th century resulted in a rapid population boom and the city gradually expanded onto the surrounding farmland. Most of Aarhus was at the time situated north of the Aarhus River although some limited development had taken place along the south shore. The southern boundary of the city was marked by what is today the alleyways Telefonsmøgen and Posthussmøgen which at the time had been toll stations.

The merchant Henrik Schandorff owned the land immediately south of the city and in 1854 he petitioned the city council for permission to parcel the land off and construct new streets. The city council approved the proposal but demanded the primary, central street in the new neighborhood be 12.5 metres [41 ft] wide which was considerable at the time. The initial development happened gradually and the new street was not fully built up until the late 1860s largely due to the fact that it was a dead end street ending at the river in a steep hill. In order to get to the center of the city from the railway station by carriage or tram it was necessary to move along Skolegade and use the bridge Mindebro while going through Søndergade was only possible for pedestrians and then required a significant detour. In 1884 the bridge Skt. Clemens Bro was constructed in Søndergade, effectively lengthening it and making it, along with Ryesgade, a direct route from the Central Railway Station to the central square Store Torv and the cathedral.

The opening of Skt. Clemens Bro made Søndergade into the premier commercial street in the city, connecting the old neighborhoods north of the river to the newer developments, such as Frederiksbjerg, south of the river. Several buildings constructed in the 1850s were demolished in favor of larger structures that could accommodate the need for larger businesses. In 1904 The first electrical tram lines were built to run through Ryesgade and Søndergade and in 1929 it was widened to a double line. In 1972, on 7 November, Søndergade was pedestrianized, the tram lines removed and new paving stones, street lights, benches, trees and phone booths put in while heating was installed under the street to keep it snow-free during winter. 30 years later in 2001-02 the paving was replaced again and the pedestrian zone expanded to include Ryesgade.

In 1944 an act of Schalburgtage carried out by the Peter group demolished a number of buildings in Søndergade in 5-6 explosions. The destroyed buildings were Søndergade 1A, 29, 47, 49, 58 and 60 with the first building hit being Ankerhus that burned down and was never rebuilt. The first explosion occurred at 1.20 in the night and the rescue operations were underway when the other bombs went off.

== Structures ==
The first parcel of land sold in 1954 went to Søren Frich who established his factory Frichs there before it moved to Åbyhøj. In 1919 the factory was removed and the prominent Regina building was constructed in its place, designed by local architect Axel Høeg-Hansen. The Regina building was a central event venue, hotel and cinema in the city for many years, but was later used for other purposes including and arcade with stores, a pub and a restaurant. From 2017, Regina is being redeveloped to house luxury apartments, but with the same original facade. The large department store Salling is located in Søndergade and there is a sculpture and fountain by the sculptor Erik Heide named Fugl med Guldæble (Bird with Gold Apple) close by.

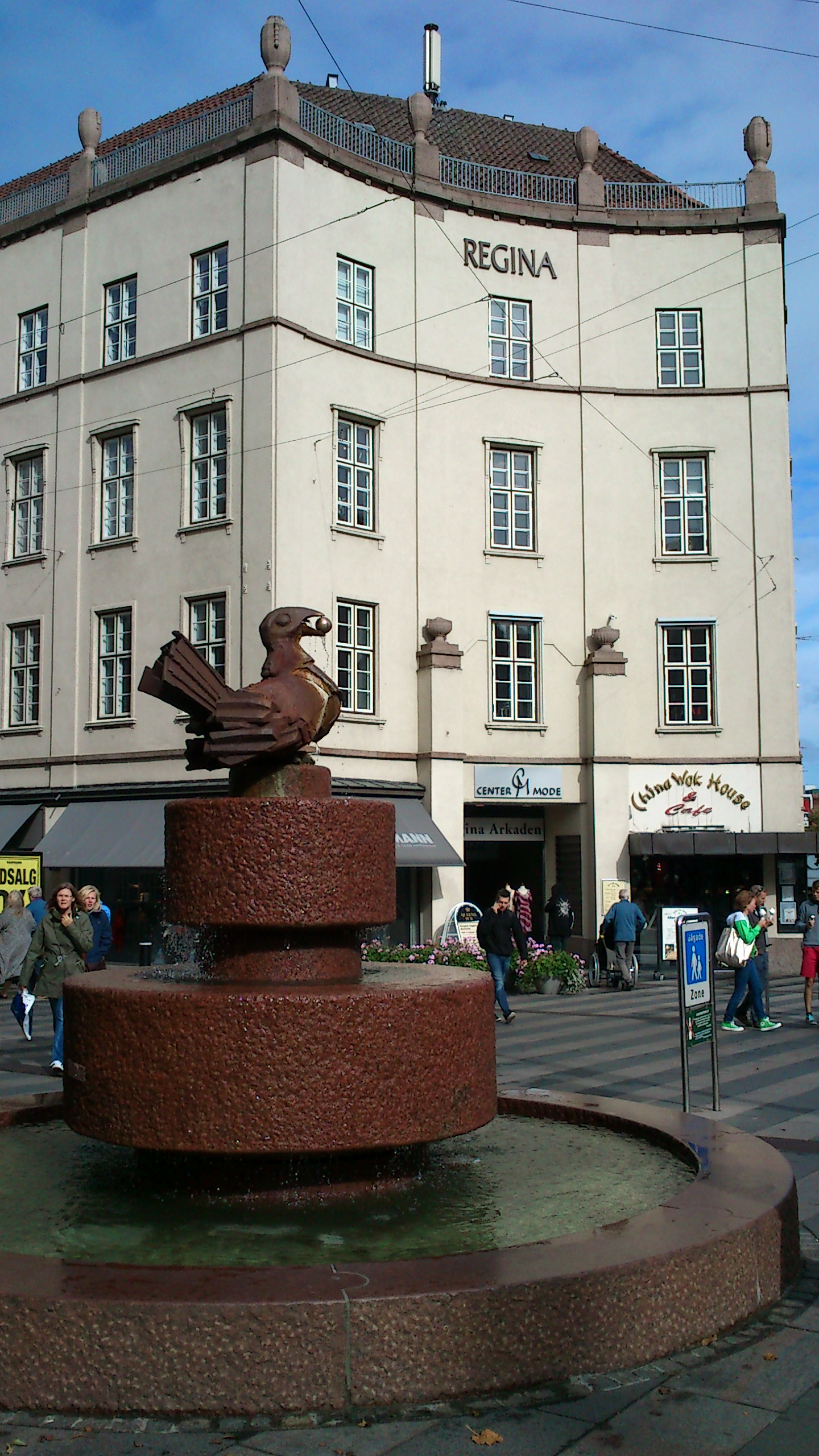
The granite fountain "Fugl med Guldæble" (Bird with Golden Apple) and the Regina building in the background

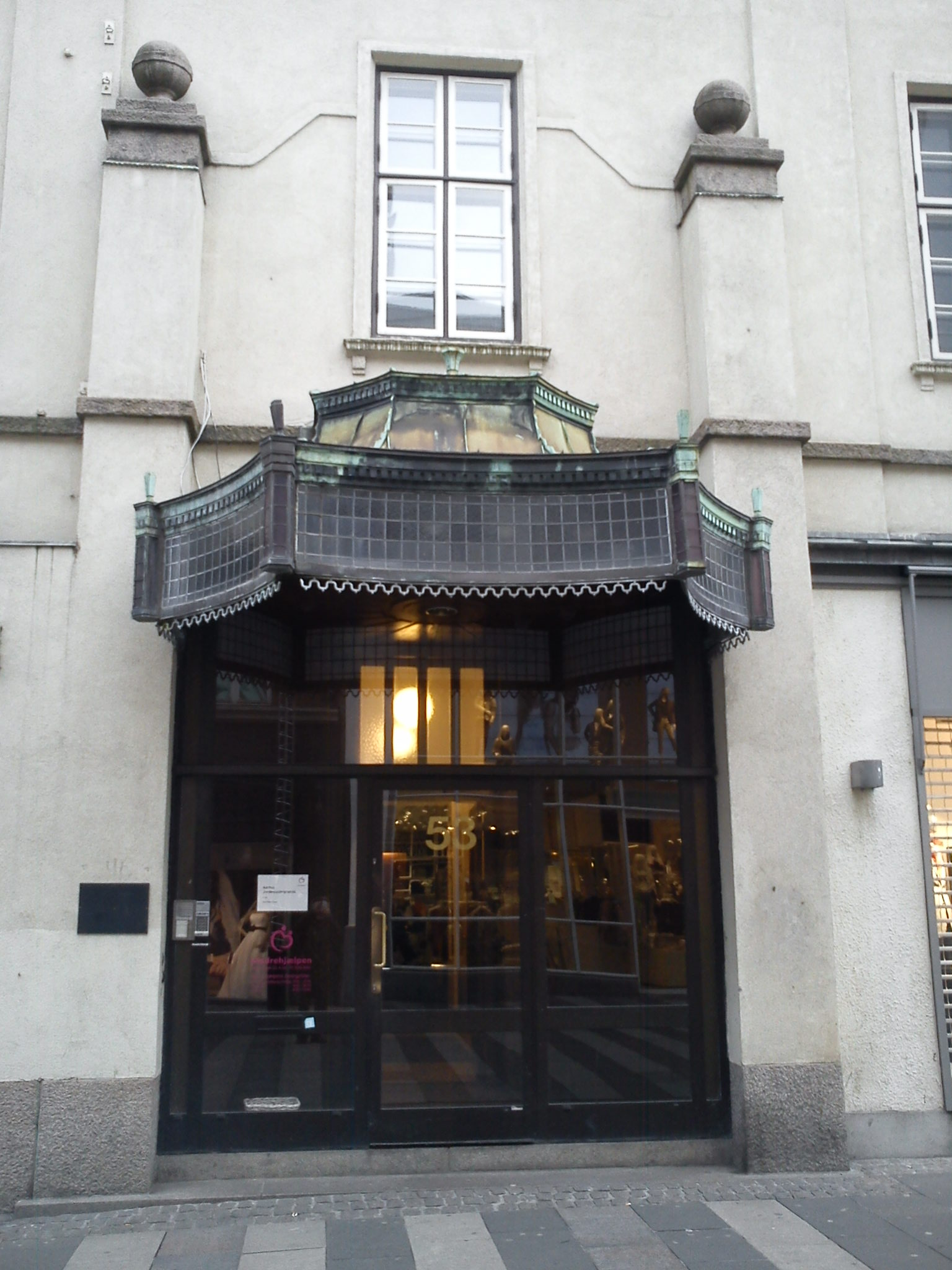
An entrance to the Regina building

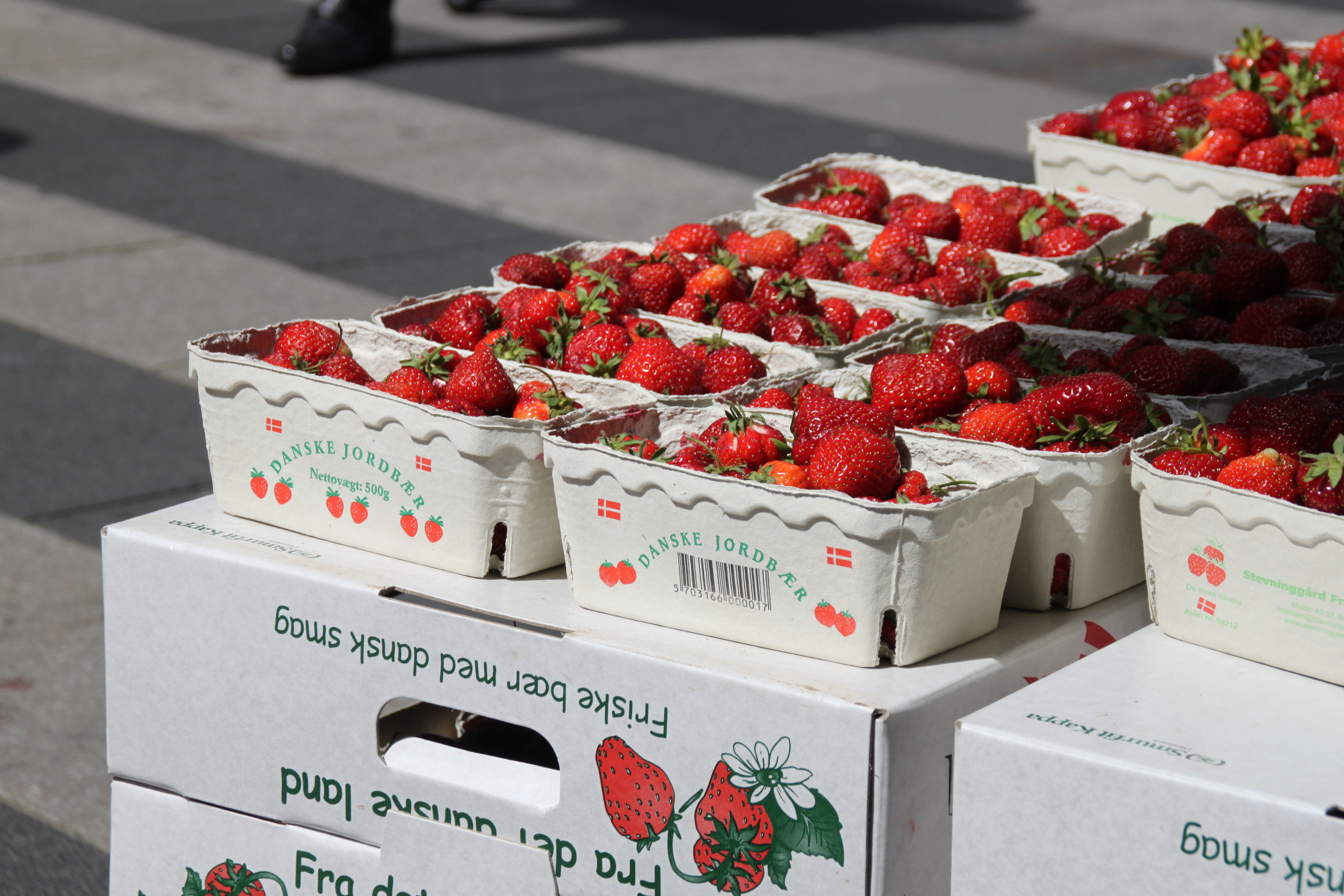
Street sales

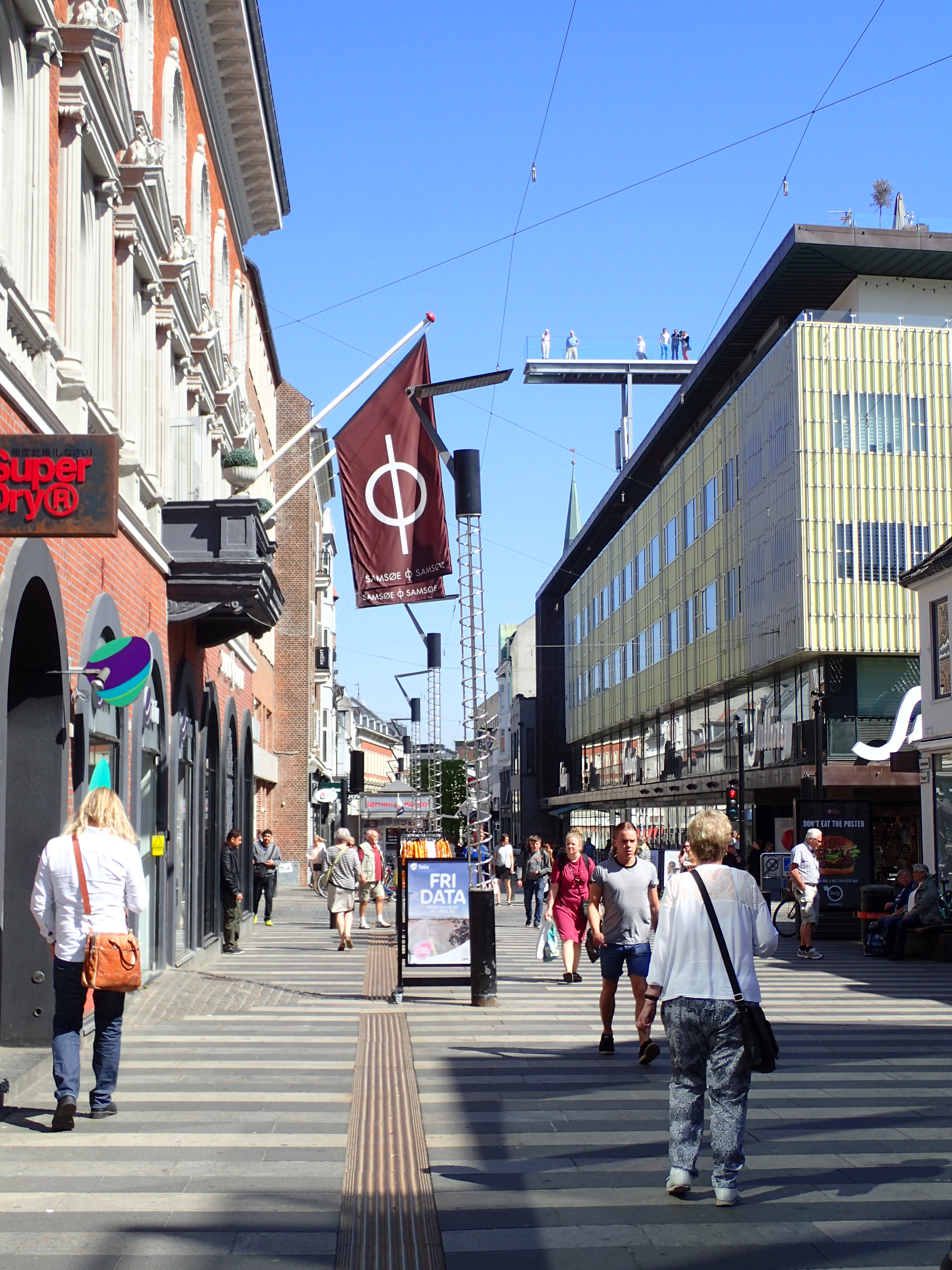
Søndergade is pedestrianized

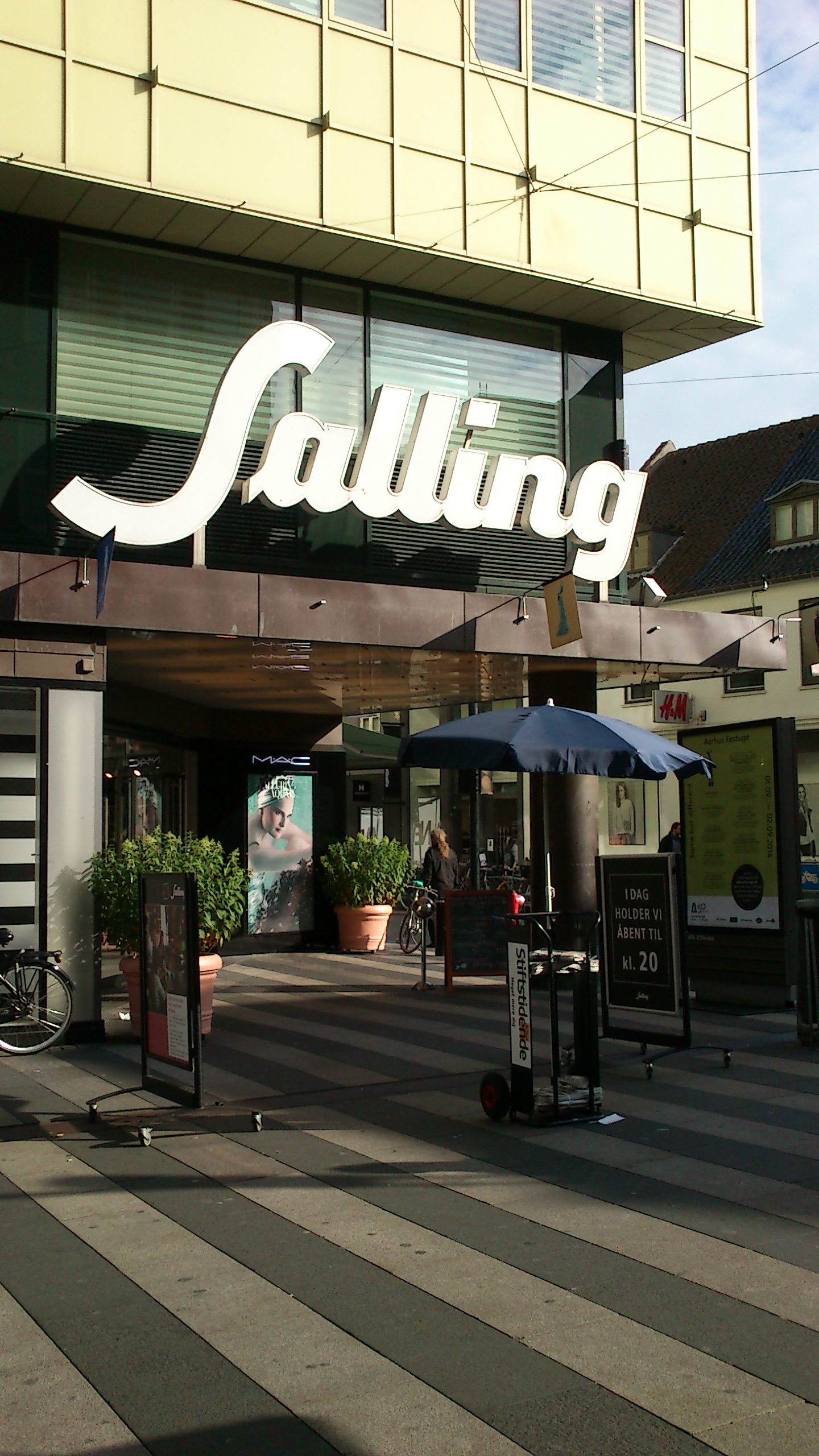
Salling department store

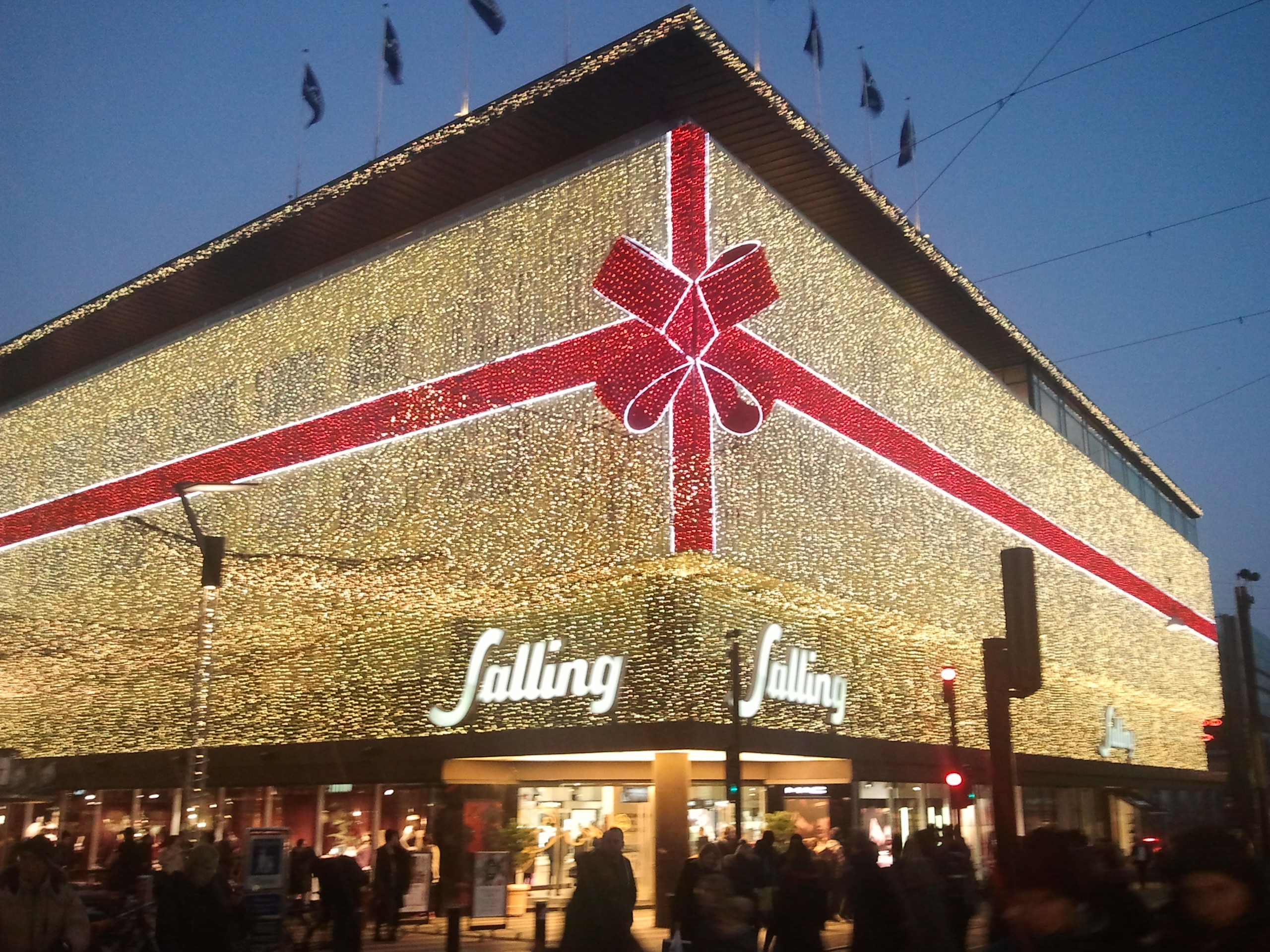
Salling department store decorated for Christmas
