= Kunsthal Aarhus =

Arts centre in Aarhus, Denmark

Coordinates: 56.155072°N 10.201982°E

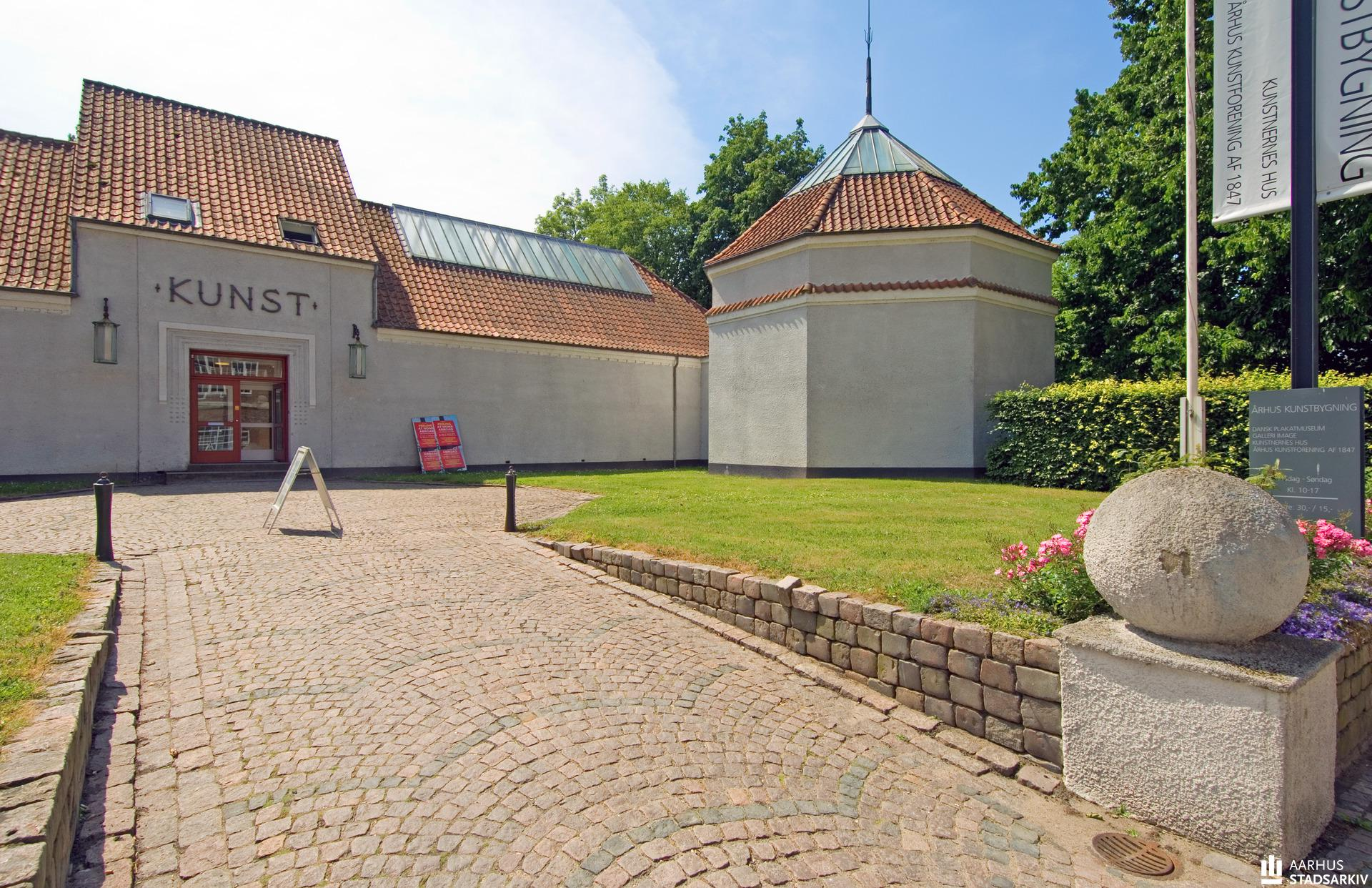
Kunsthal Aarhus

Kunsthal Aarhus is a contemporary arts centre located in the city of Aarhus in Denmark.

== History ==
Kunsthal Aarhus was established in 1917 on the initiative of Aarhus Art Association of 1847, and it remains the only arts centre in Aarhus and one of the oldest in Denmark and Europe. With its founding mission to "inspire and promote a general knowledge of the fine arts", the art's centre was received with great enthusiasm by the public and has since played a central role in developing and presenting international contemporary art in Denmark. Originally designed by architect Axel Høeg-Hansen, the institution went through a process of artistic and architectural expansions, most notably by C. F. Møller Architects in the 1990s and 2000s, to take its current form with over 1,000 m^{2} of exhibition spaces, which doubled the exhibition space and increased the number of visitors.

Aarhus Kunsthal has 1,000 m^{2} of exhibition halls, making it one of Denmark’s largest and most important venues for contemporary art. On display are solo exhibitions, thematic exhibitions, special exhibitions and dialogue exhibitions between Danish and foreign artists covering all fields of artwork from painting and sculpture to photography, film and video.

From 2013, one of the first significant changes associated with the new programme, is the development of a new visual identity in collaboration with the Danish strategic design firm Designit. As part of the process of reconnecting its history and future vision, "Århus Kunstbygning" has been transformed into "Kunsthal Aarhus".
