= Axel Høeg-Hansen =

Danish architect

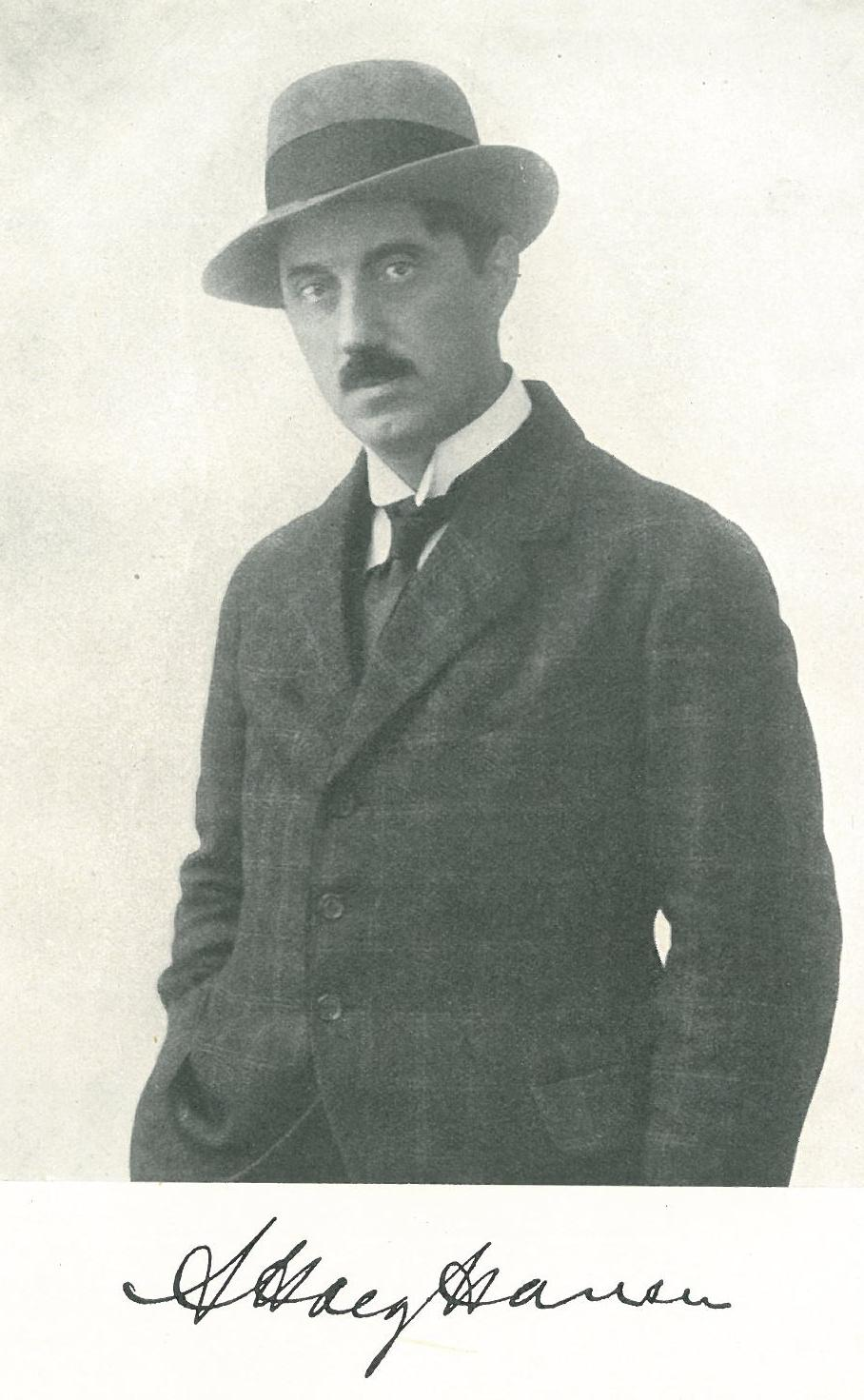
- Born: 27 June 1877; Sorø, Denmark
- Died: 30 August 1947 (aged 70); Aarhus, Denmark
- Education: Royal Danish Academy of Fine Arts
- Occupation: Architect
- Buildings: Kunsthal Aarhus (1917); Atletion 1920
- Projects: Park Allé

Axel Høeg-Hansen (27 June 1877 – 30 August 1947) was a Danish architect. Stylistically he mainly worked in neoclassical and functionalist styles. He primarily worked in and around Aarhus at the turn of the 20th century.

== Background ==
Axel Høeg-Hansen was born at Frederiksberg in Copenhagen. His parents were Henrik Hansen and Alma Isabella Clausen. He attended vocational school for business in 1893–94 and went on to become a master mason in 1897. He attended vocational technical school from which he graduated in 1898 and was then admitted to the architect school of the Royal Danish Academy of Fine Arts where he studied between 1898 and 1907 and graduated with a degree in architecture.

Høeg-Hansen worked for Ulrik Plesner in 1898; Claudius August Wiinholt between 1898–99; Fritz Koch between 1900 and 1905 and Anton Rosen between 1907 and 1909. He had his own architects company in Aarhus from 1909 and held an exhibition on the Charlottenborg Spring Exhibition the same year. From 1935 to 1940 his company was jointly run with Harald Salling-Mortensen.

Høeg-Hansen received K.A. Larssens Legat 1905–06, bronze medal at the Danish National Exhibition of 1909, the silver medal in 1920 for Atletion and received the Architects' Association of Denmark's honorary medal in 1939. He represented Denmark in the discipline architecture at the 1928 Summer Olympics in Amsterdam. He was a member of the board of Architects' Association of Denmark from 1909 to 1919 and chairman of the department of Jutland from 1933 to 1938.

Høeg-Hansen built many notable structures in Aarhus and left his mark across the city. He designed Kunsthal Aarhus (1917), Atletion (1920), the yellow city blocks in Park Allé and at Banegårdspladsen (1920s), Aarhus County Hospital (1935) and neighborhoods in the southern part of the city.

== Personal life ==
He was married on 23 June 1909 in Helgenæs to Norwegian lnga Pauline Liggern Hansen. Høeg-Hansen became Knight of the Order of the Dannebrog 1924 and Dannebrogsmand in 1935. He died in 1947 at Frederiksværk and was buried on Solbjerg Parkkirkegård in Frederiksbjerg.

== Selected works ==
- Regina, Søndergade (1918)
- Slippen (1918) Port of Aarhus administrative building
- Atletion (1916–18)
- Banegårdspladsen, Park Allé, Søndergade and Ryesgade. Urban planning project in Aarhus (late 1920s).
- Aarhus County Hospital (1931, with Harald Salling-Mortensen)
- Roskilde County Hospital (1937–40, with Harald Salling-Mortensen and Hans Schmidt)
- Administrative building for Frichs in Åbyhøj

== Gallery ==
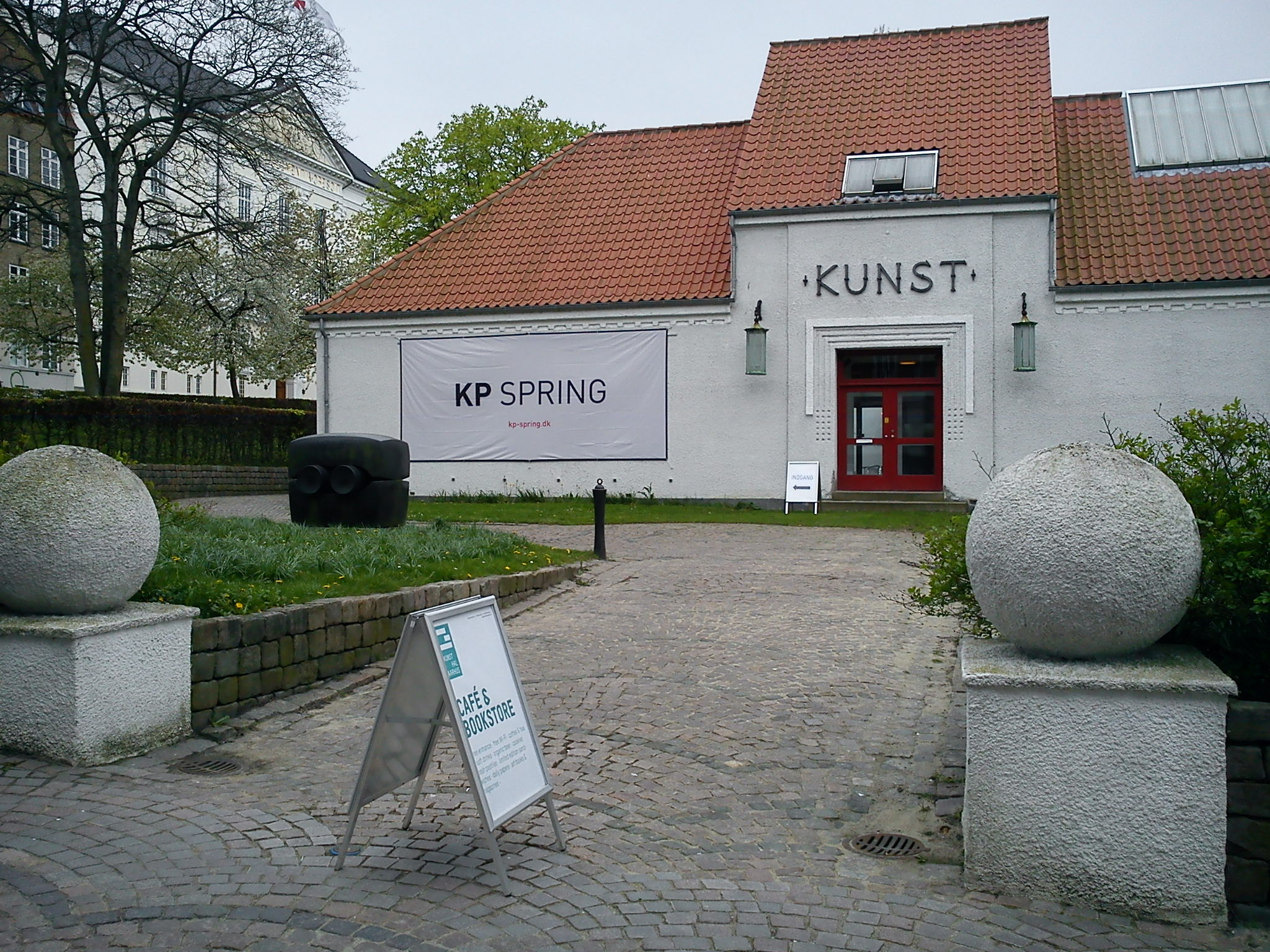
Kunsthal Aarhus (1917)

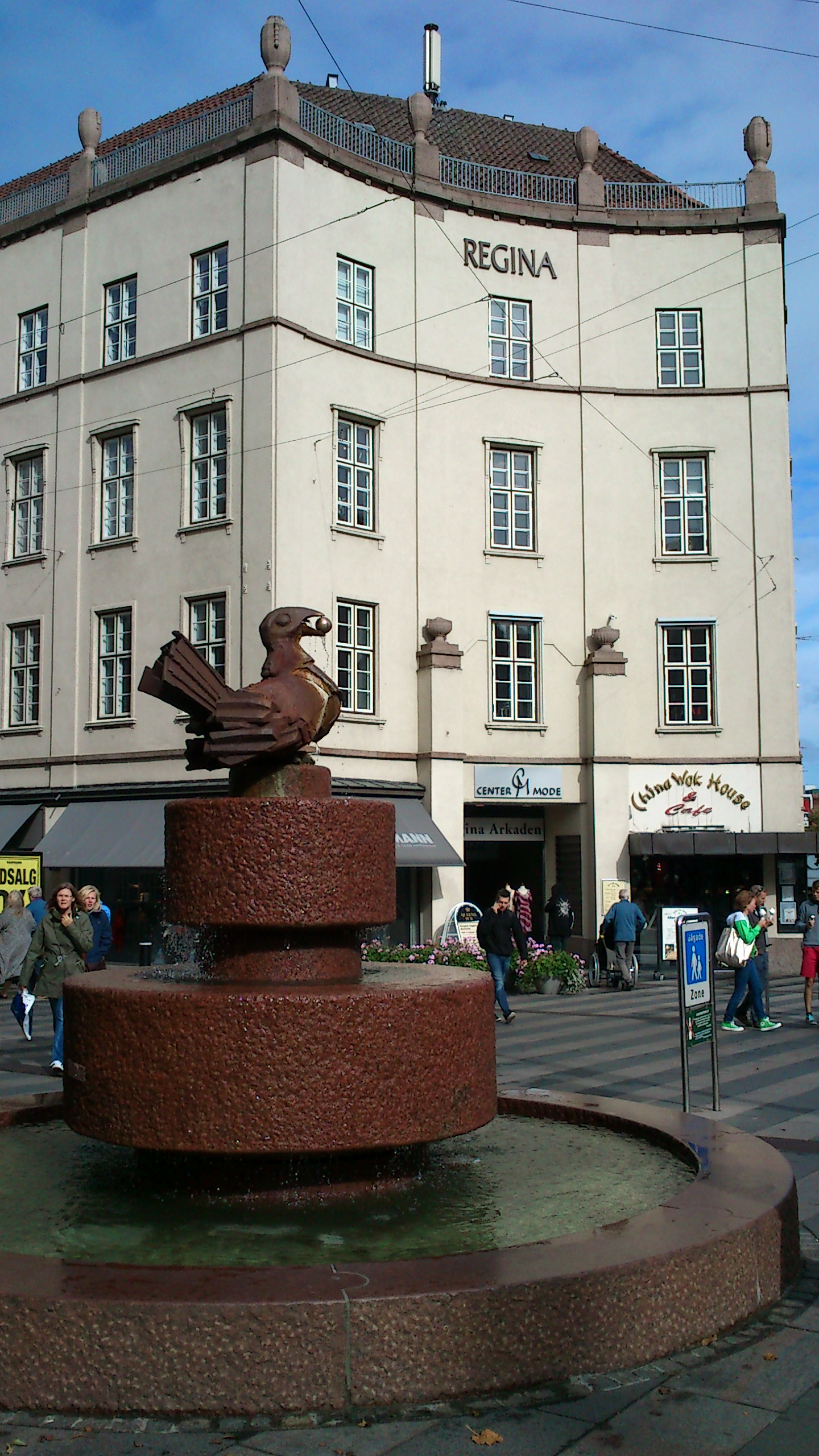
Regina building

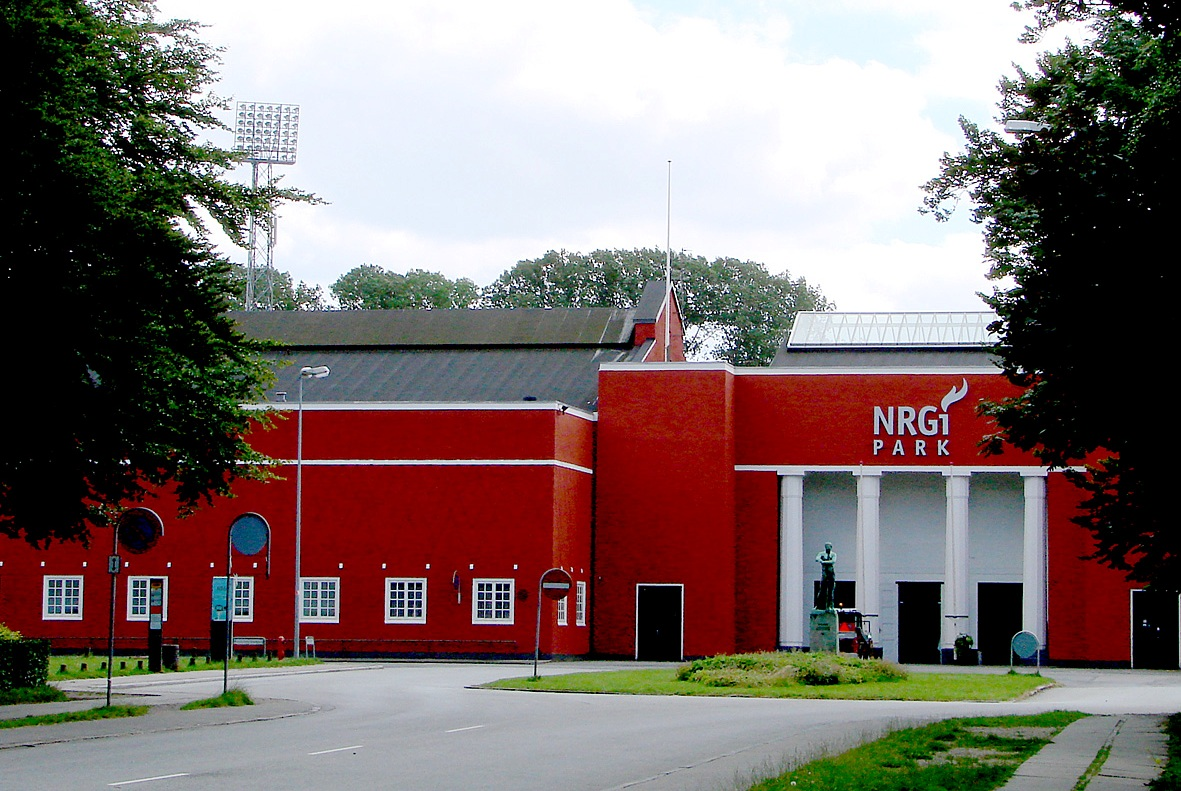
Atletion stadium

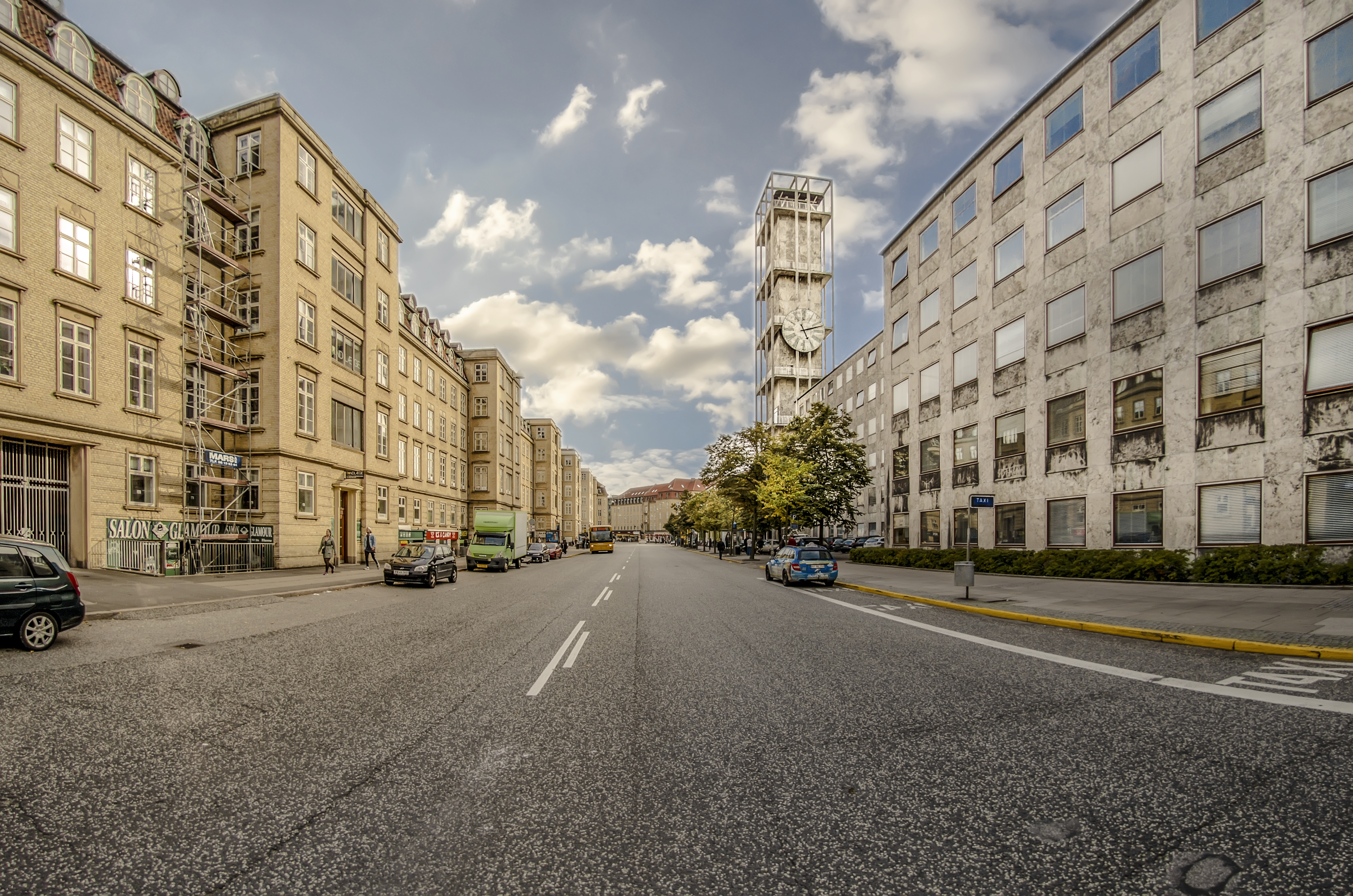
Park Allé

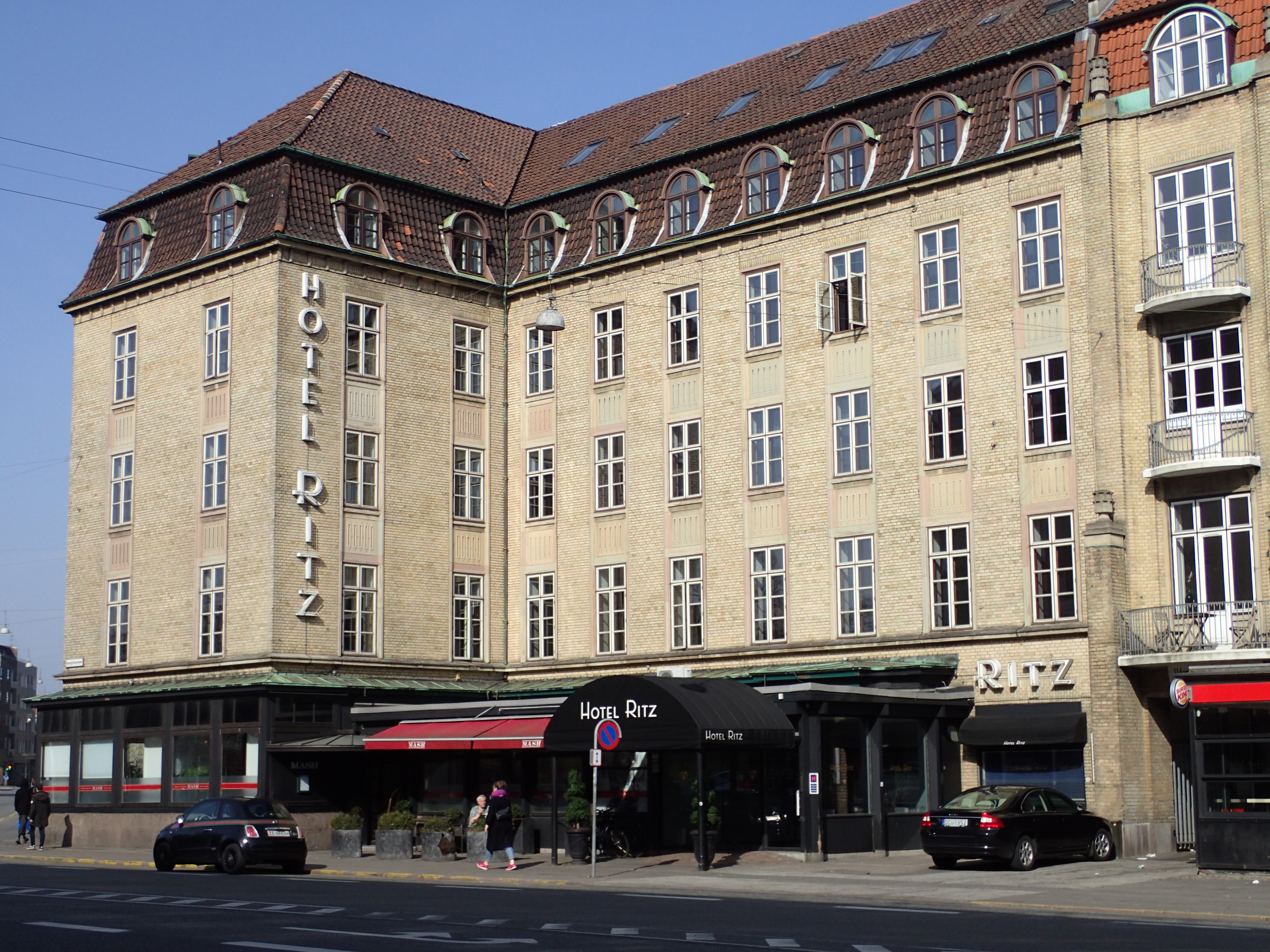
Hotel Ritz Aarhus, Park Allé

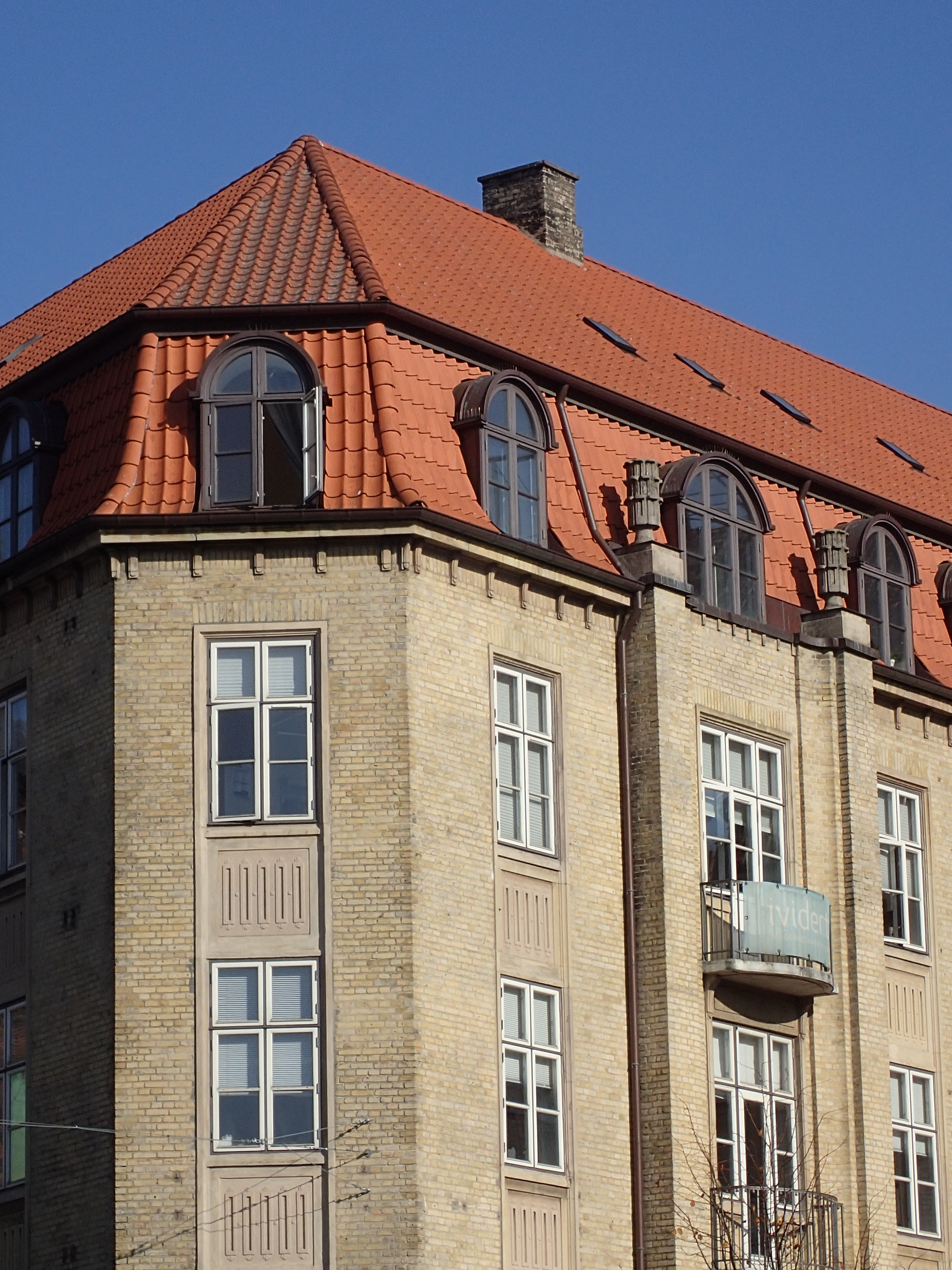
Banegårdspladsen, facade detail (1929)

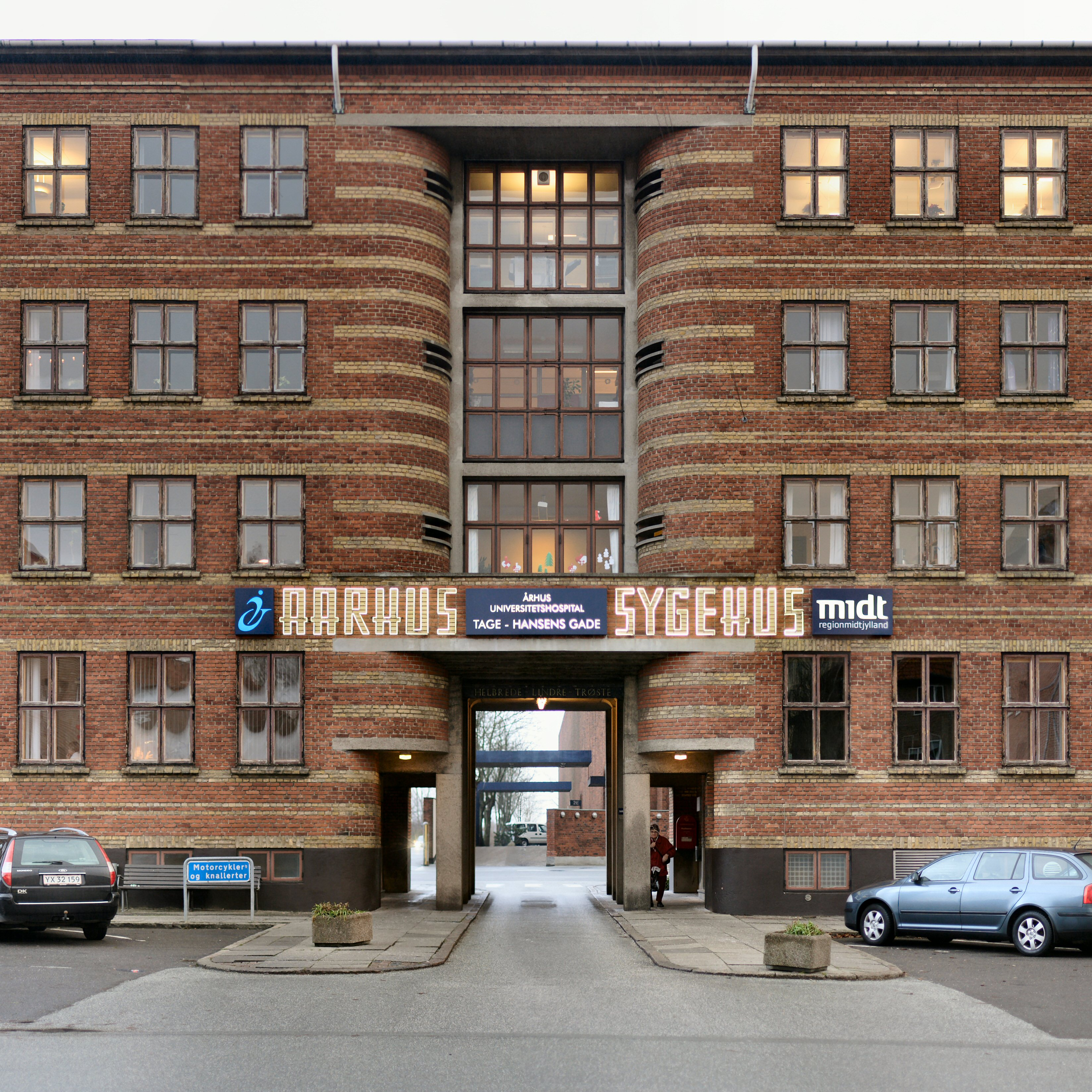
Aarhus County Hospital main entrance
