= Park Allé, Aarhus =

Street in Aarhus, Denmark

Park Allé
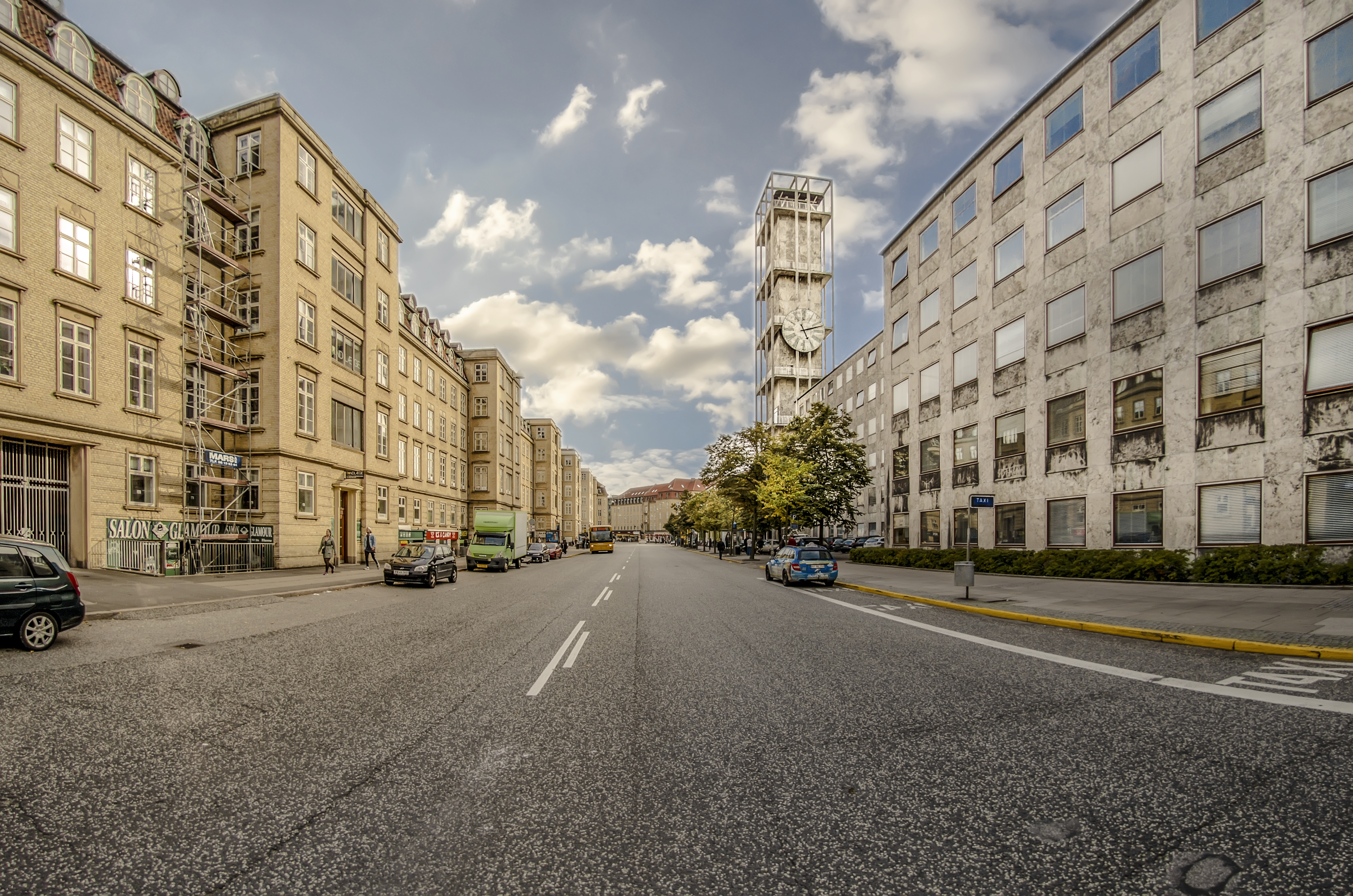
- Park Allé early morning
- Length: 274 m (899 ft)
- Location: Indre By, Aarhus, Denmark
- Postal code: 8000
- Coordinates: 56°09′06.7″N 10°12′11.9″E

Park Allé (lit. "Park Avenue") is a street in the Indre By district in Aarhus, Denmark, which runs north to south from Sønder Allé to Banegårdspladsen. Park Allé is a major bus hub and is home to Aarhus City Hall, City Hall Square and two large hotels, The Mayor Hotel and Hotel Ritz.

== History ==
The name Park Allé references the former Søndre Kirkegård (South Cemetery) that used to be situated on the area where Park Allé, the City Hall Park and City Hall are located today. In 1920 the city council decided that the cemetery should be removed and the area developed into a new neighborhood and park. The city council held an architectural contest to determine the overall design of the area. The contest was won by architect Axel Høeg-Hansen and city engineer Oscar Jørgensen.

Park Allé was established in the years after 1921 as the first stage of a larger plan. The yellow brick residential buildings along Park Allé was built a short time after with the first building facing Sønder Allé being finished in 1925 and the last being finished in 1932. The cemetery was removed in 1926 and a park was planned for the area instead. The street running along the park was named Park Avenue by the City Council in 1925. The rapid growth of the city made it necessary to build a new city hall and the area was chosen for it. In 1941, Aarhus City Hall was completed and City Hall Park was built behind it.

== Notable buildings ==
The largest and most iconic building on Park Allé is Aarhus City Hall, designed by architects Arne Jacobsen and Erik Møller. The city hall is a listed building and a part of the Danish Culture Canon. It is a 5-story marble-clad building with a 60-meter-tall (200 ft) clock tower.

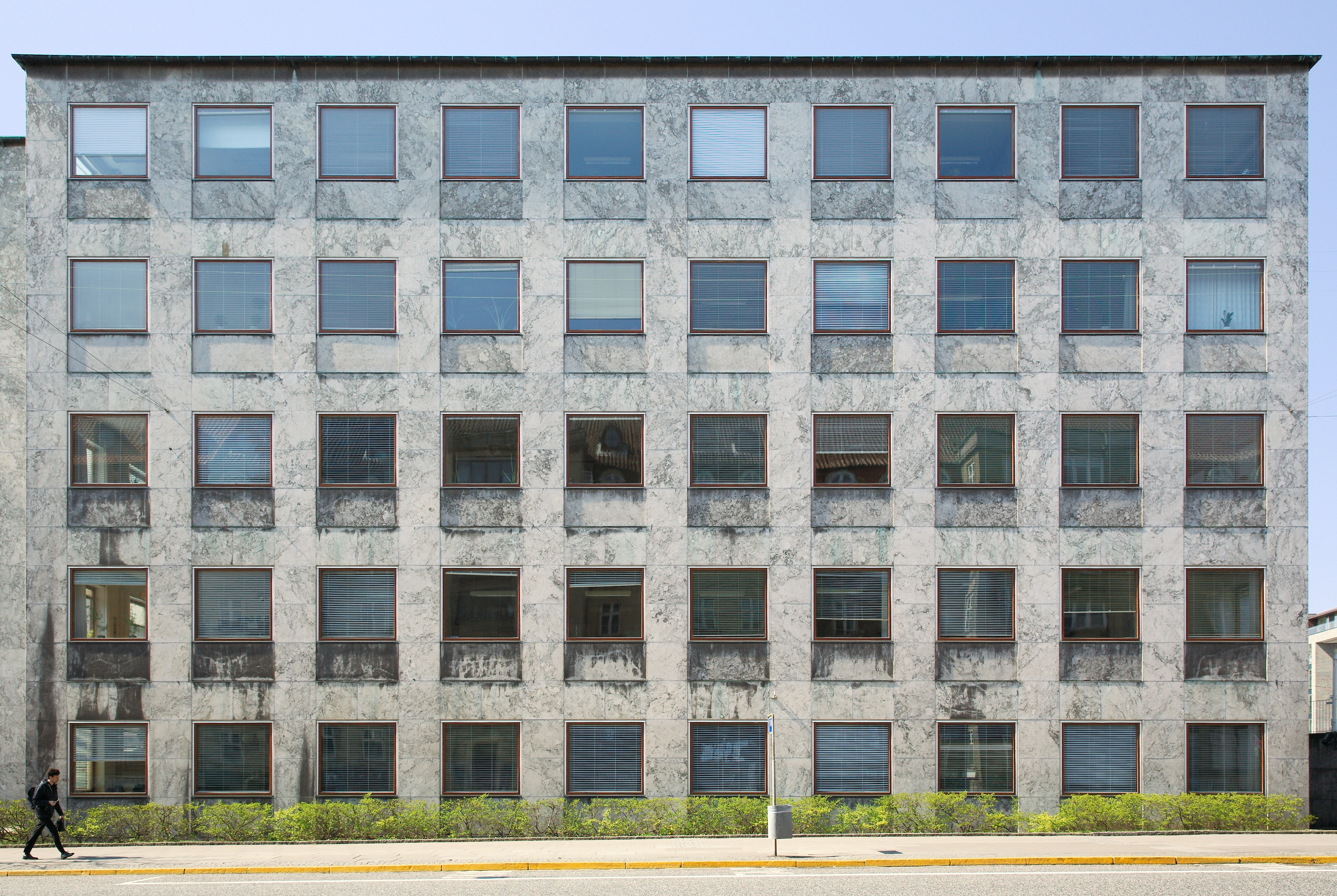
Marble facade of the City Hall

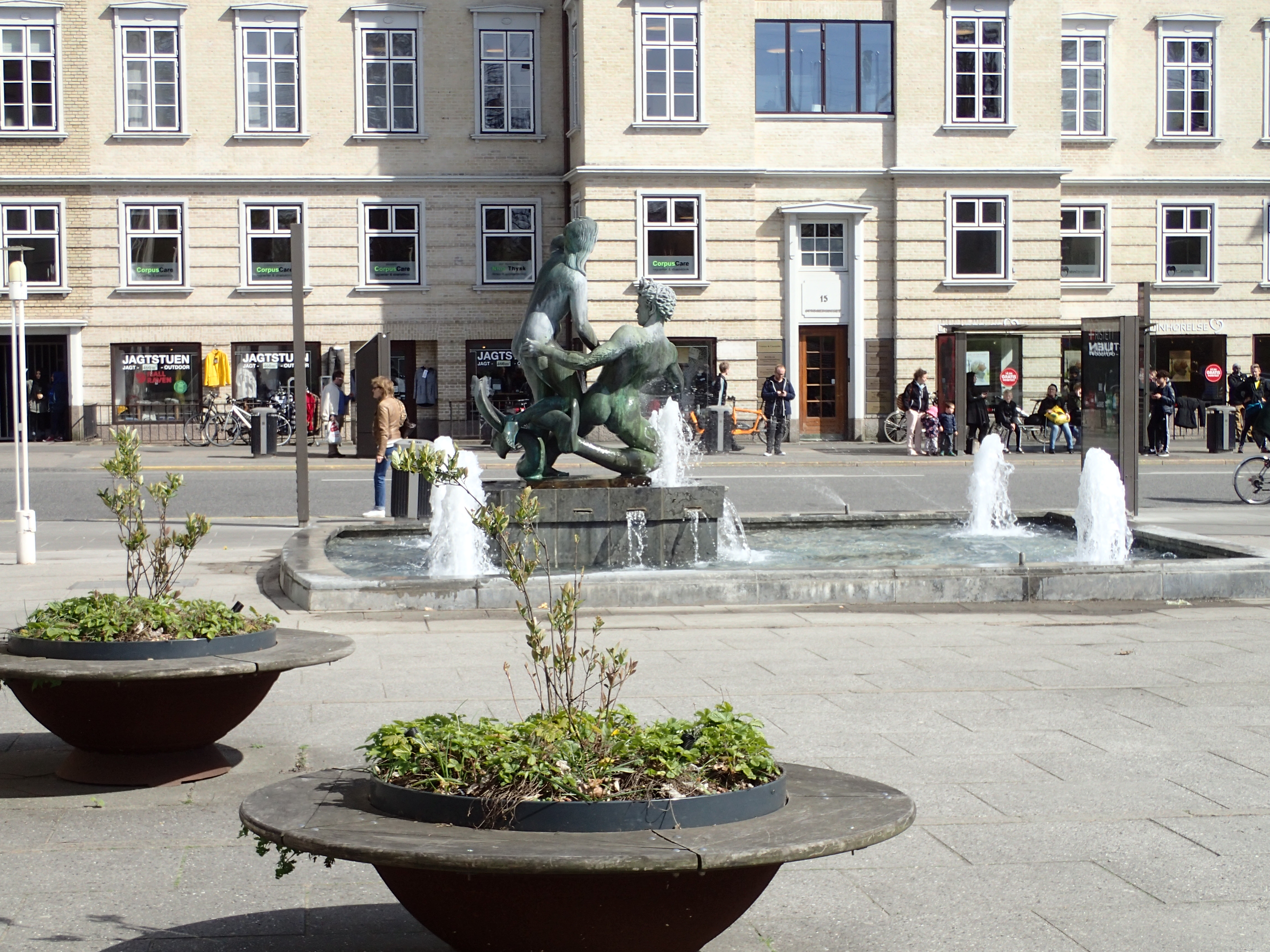
Agnethe og Havmanden, a bronze sculpture fountain at the city gate square.

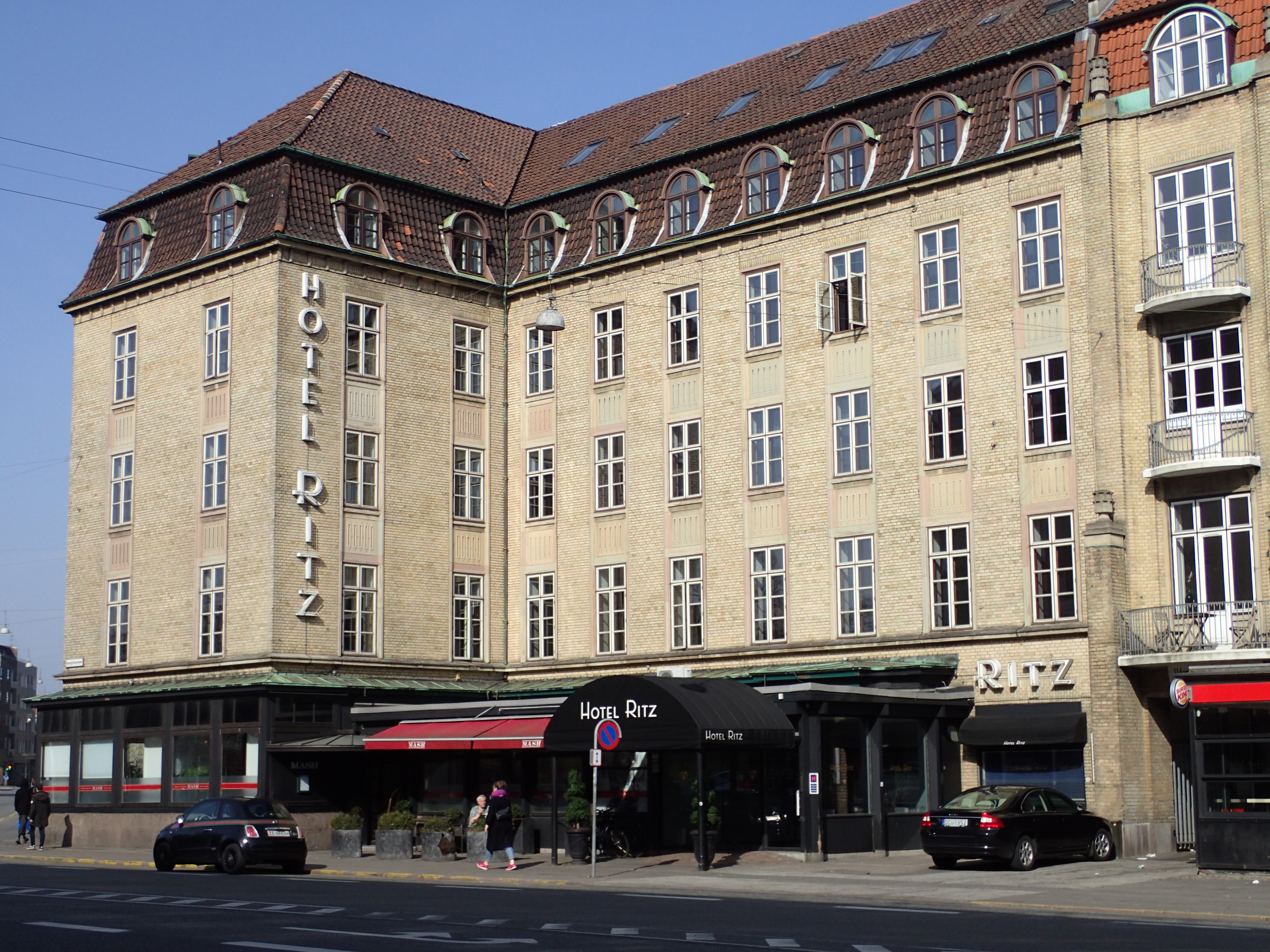
Hotel Ritz
