= Lille Torv =

Square in Aarhus, Denmark

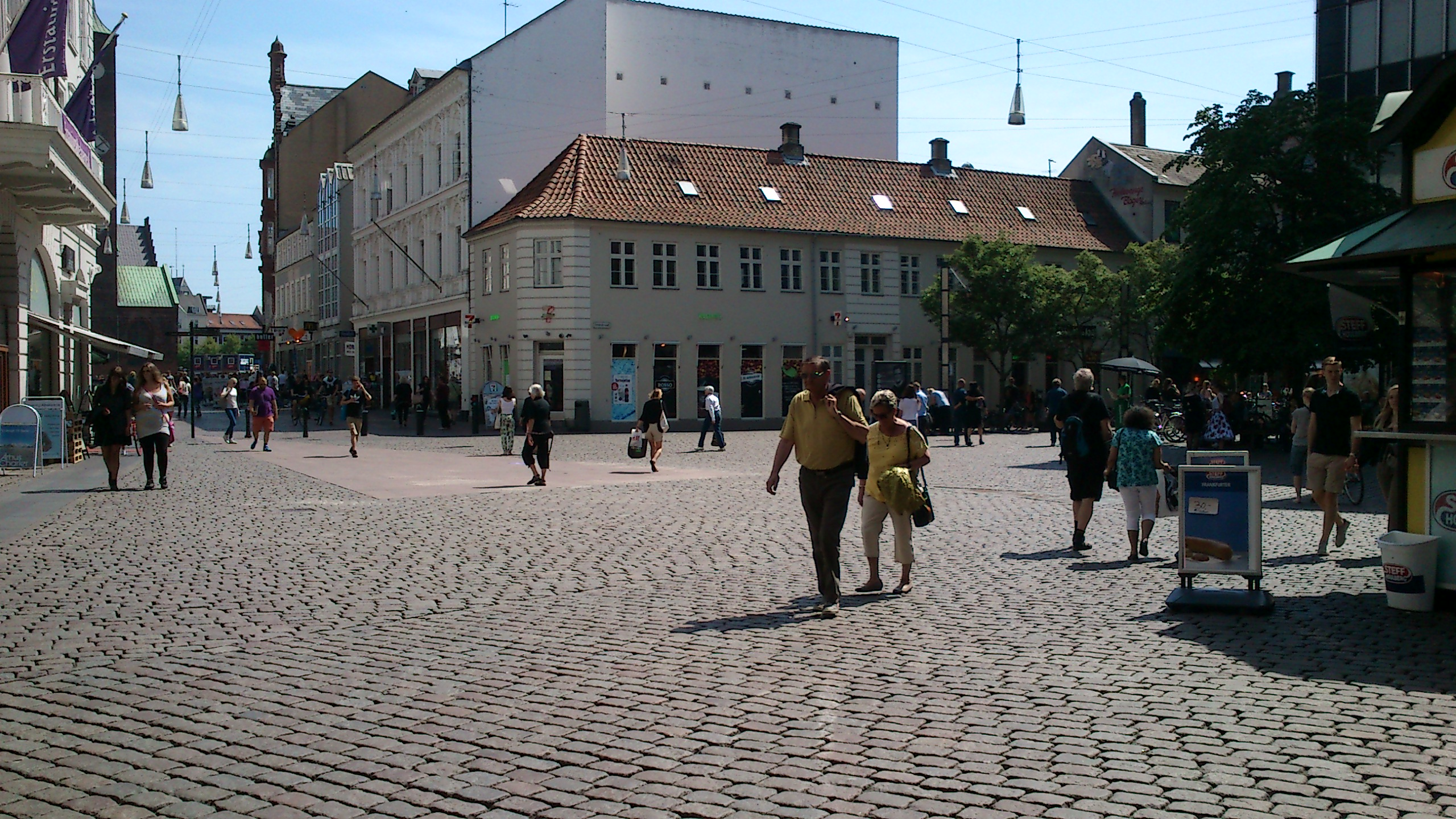
- Lille Torv
- Interactive map of Lille Torv
- Former name(s): Torvet, Gammeltorv
- Location: Indre By, Aarhus, Denmark
- Postal code: 8000
- Coordinates: 56°09′27.5″N 10°12′26.2″E

Lille Torv (lit. 'Little Square') is a cobbled public square located in the Indre By neighborhood in Aarhus, Denmark. It is situated between the squares of Store Torv and Immervad in the historic Latin Quarter neighborhood and it is one of the oldest public squares in Aarhus. The streets of Vestergade, Guldsmedgade, Immervad and Badstuegade radiates from Lille Torv. It is today a venue for public events and gatherings in the city. The square is home to some notable buildings such as the storied Meulengracht's House and the listed Business- and Agricultural Bank of Jutland.

== History ==
Little Square was originally a swampy area outside the city walls of the medieval town. In c. 1200, the area was drained and in 1250 Little Square was established where major thoroughfares met. When Little Square had been established the street of Immervad was created, crossing the Aarhus River. The square today has roughly the same dimensions and proportions as when it was initially created in 1250. The name "Lille Torv" was applied to the square in the 1700s whereas it had previously been known as Gammeltorv (lit. 'Old Square') or simply "Torvet" (lit. 'The Square'). Since the 1200s, Little Square, along with Great Square, has been one of the primary market squares in Aarhus. Weekly markets were held here up until the 1800s when farmers and traders from the catchment areas around the town would gather here and trade. In 1896, the city council closed the St. Oluf's Market and in the years after the rest of the markets in the city closed as traffic gradually increased and took over the public spaces.

In 1904, electrical trams started operating in Aarhus and Little Square became a hub where tram lines would intersect and trams would stop for breaks. Buses and trams had to negotiate Lille Torv to get through the narrow, curved streets of Guldsmedgade and Klostergade, eventually confining pedestrians to sidewalks. In the late 1990s, the Aarhus River was reopened, removing the former street of Åboulevarden that covered it in the process. In connection with this project it no longer made sense to have motorized traffic at Little Square and it again became the domain of pedestrians.

== Notable buildings ==
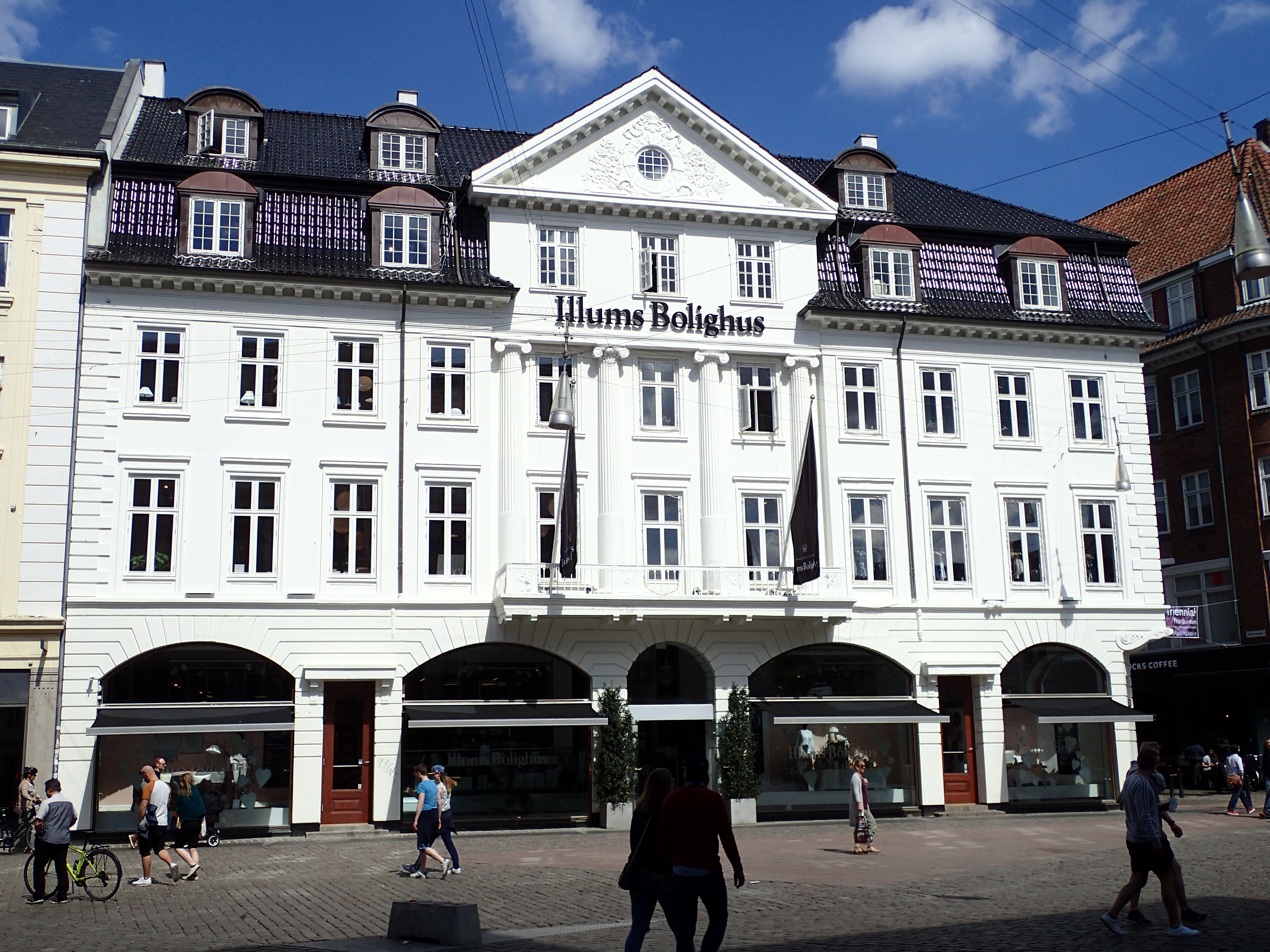
"Det Hvide Palæ" (The White Mansion), showpiece of the Meulengracht Complex.

The central location of the square and the markets formerly held here meant it was a desirable location for merchants to establish themselves. Little Square is therefore home to several notable and storied merchant mansions. Meulengracht's House with address on Lille Torv 2 was built by the merchant Harboe Meulengracht in the late 1700s and was for a time the social focal point for the high society and even royalty. Today Meulengracht's House is home to stores. The Business- and Agricultural Bank of Jutland is a listed building by the architect Sophus Frederik Kühnel featuring architecture relatively unique to Aarhus. Previously the square was also home to the Mayor's House (Danish: Borgmestergården) which was moved to Tangkrogen during the Danish National Exhibition of 1909 and afterwards to the Botanical Gardens where it became the first building in the Old Town Museum.
