= Store Torv =

Square in Aarhus, Denmark

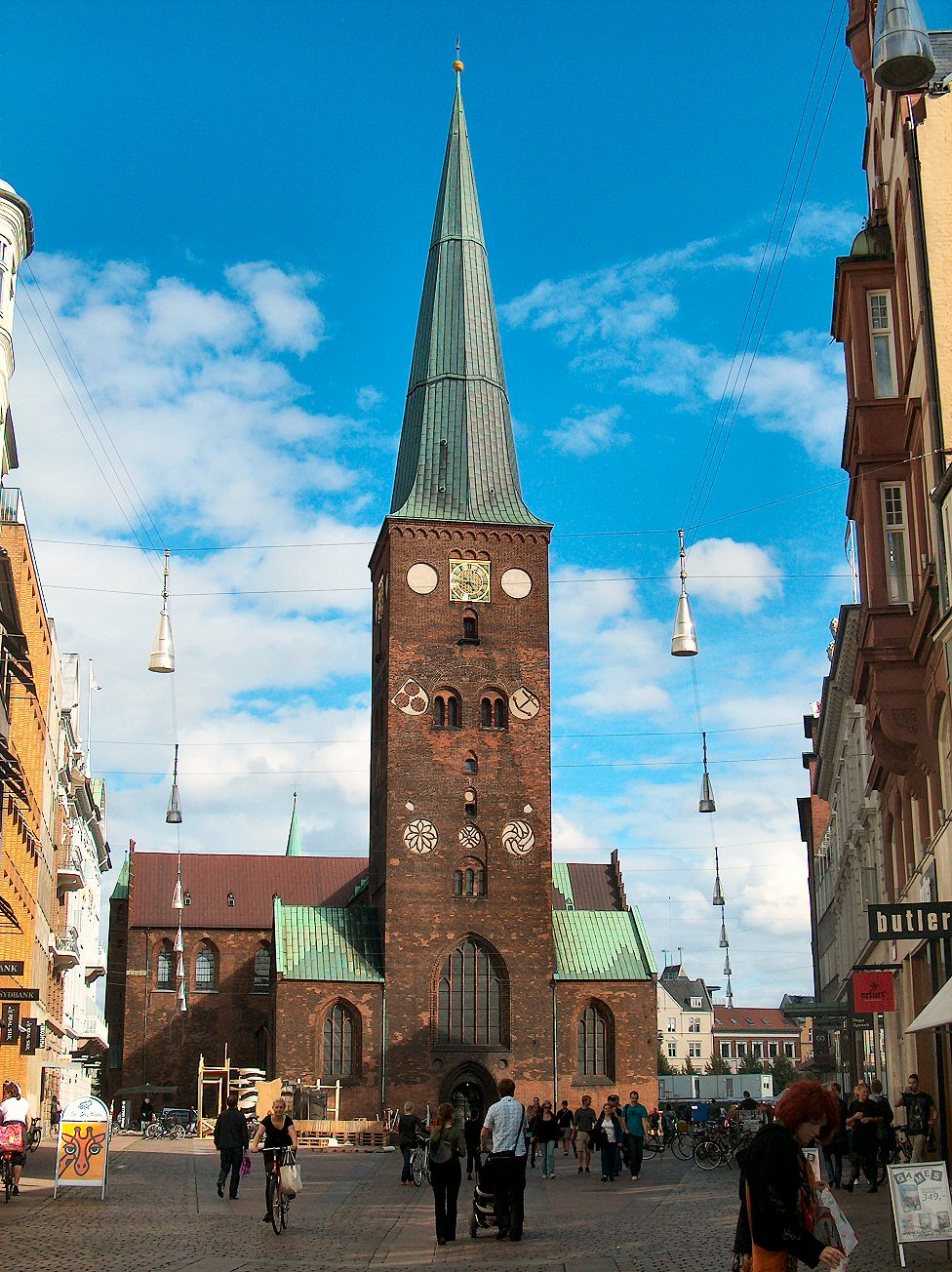
- The square of Store Torv
- Former name(s): Torvegaden
- Location: Indre By, Aarhus, Denmark
- Postal code: 8000
- Coordinates: 56°09′25.5″N 10°12′34.2″E

Store Torv (lit. Great Square) is a public square located in the Indre By neighborhood in Aarhus, Denmark. It is situated between Lille Torv and Aarhus Cathedral, shaped as an elongated triangle. It is the largest public square in Aarhus and one of the oldest venues for markets in the city. The square is home to many notable buildings including the dominating cathedral and is frequently host to cultural events.

Store Torv is part of the pedestrian zone in the inner city and connects directly to the squares of Lille Torv, Skt. Clemens Torv, Bispetorv and Domkirketorvet.

== History ==
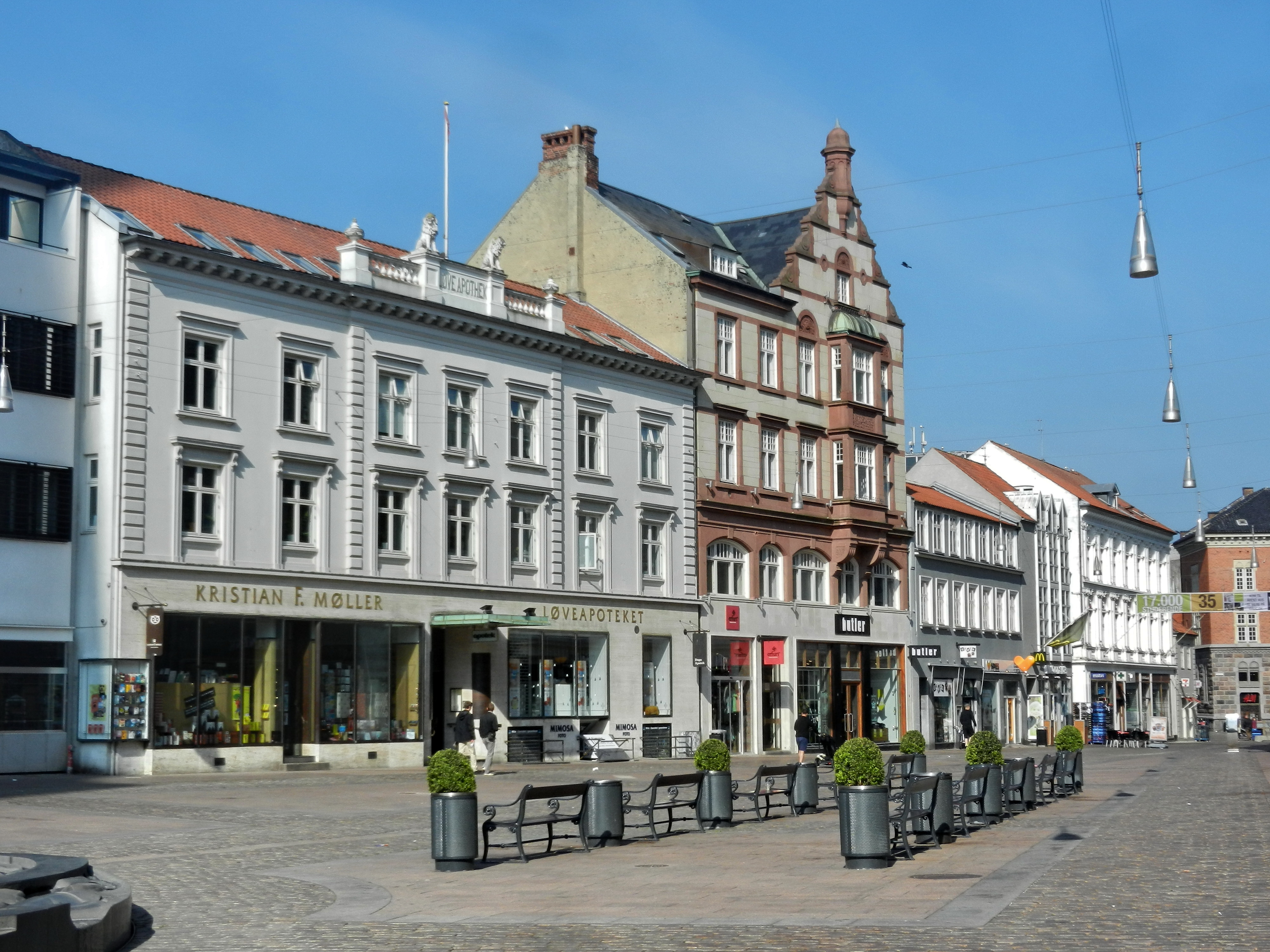
The central parts of the square with the historic pharmacy of Løveapoteket

Store Torv emerged in about year 1200 in connection with the construction of the cathedral. In the first centuries the street was known as Torvegaden (The Square-street) and functioned as a connection between Immervad and the cathedral through Lille Torv. At the time Lille Torv was called Torvet (The Square) and later Gammeltorv (Old Square) and functioned as the center of the town. The square evolved with the city and it was originally formed very differently. The city gate Borgporten (Castle Gate) separated Store Torv from Lille Torv. The gate had a medieval tower and was used by the watchmen of the city at night. In 1685, the gate was torn down because it was an obstacle to traffic, thus removing the barrier between the two squares.

In medieval times, Store Torv was home to both the cathedral of the Diocese of Aarhus and the City Hall of Aarhus. The square was used for markets, public punishments and official celebrations. Punishments involved whipping or the stocks, but also executions by hanging. The location was convenient due to its proximity to the jailhouse beneath the city hall. In about 1600, executions were relocated to Galgebakken (Gallows-hill) outside the town. The most common use for the square was markets. After the Danish king established rules for when and how markets could be held, it became one of the largest in the town. The market was primarily for vegetables, fruit, horses and cattle. Store Torv was also used for official celebrations such as the king's birthday or New Year's Eve.

== Notable buildings ==
Store Torv is dominated by Aarhus Cathedral from around 1300. The Hotel Royal from 1838 is one of the oldest and most storied hotels in the town. The pharmacy Løveapoteket has been situated at its present location since 1710. Store Torv was previously home to the city hall.
