= Frederiksgade, Aarhus =

Street in Aarhus, Denmark

Coordinates: 56.1549°N 10.2046°E

Frederiksgade
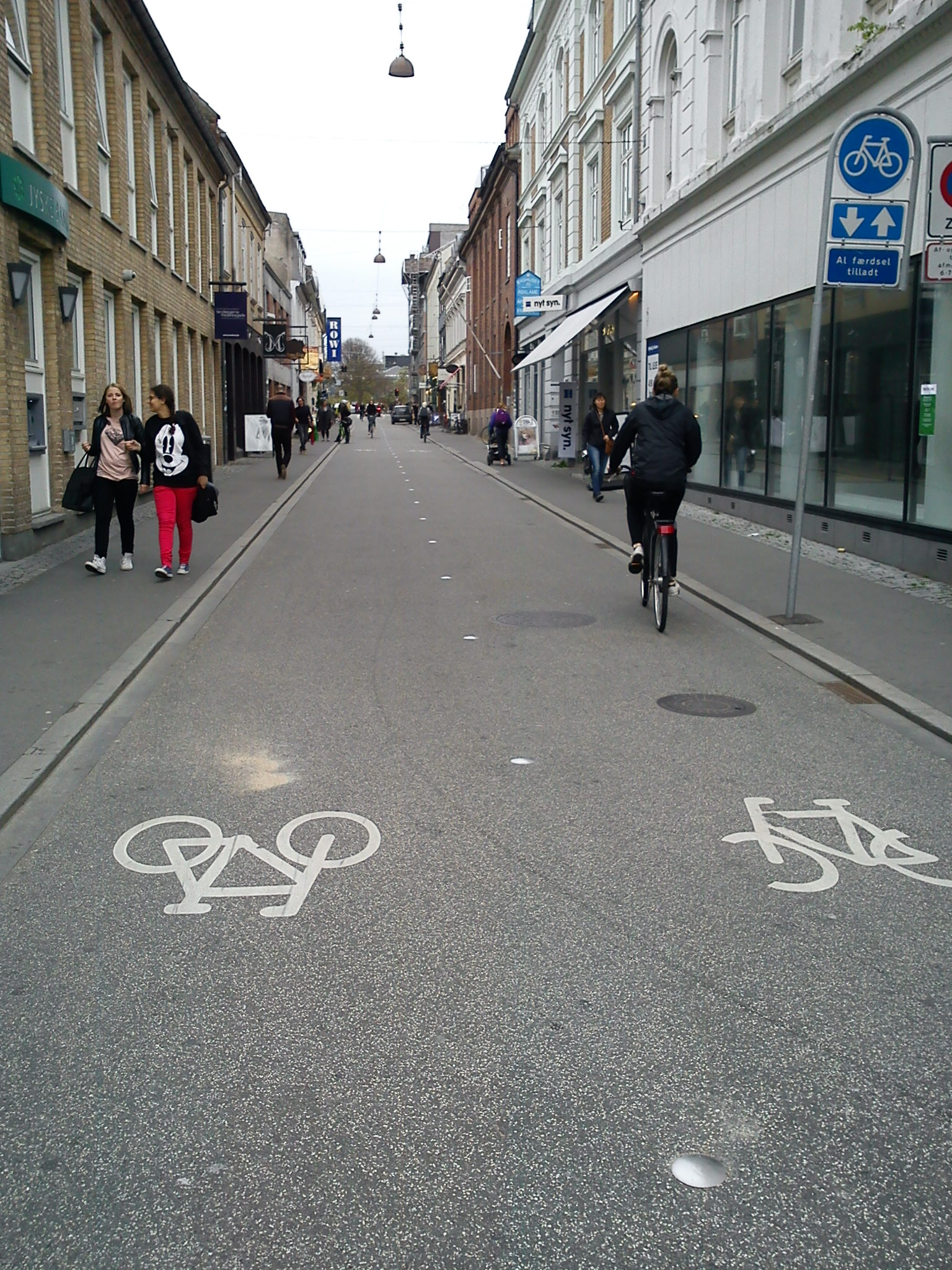
- Frederiksgade
- Interactive map of Frederiksgade
- Former name: Brobjerggade
- Length: 450 m (1,480 ft)
- Location: Indre By, Aarhus, Denmark
- Postal code: 8000

Frederiksgade (lit. "Frederik's Street") is a street in the Indre By district in Aarhus, Denmark which runs north to south from Åboulevarden to Frederiks Allé. Frederiksgade is a major thoroughfare for pedestrians and cyclists and it connects Immervad to ARoS Aarhus Art Museum and the City Hall and Concert Hall parks. The street is fairly narrow and the architecture is primarily late 19th century to early 20th century.

== History ==
In medieval times, a street extended southwards from Vadestedet (The Ford) at Immervad across a steep hill south of the Aarhus river. In the Middle Ages, a bridge was constructed at the ford and the street became known as Brobjerg (lit. Bridge-hill). The original housing along Brobjerg was constructed through the 1400s. In 1482, a sizeable Carmelite convent was built near the top of the hill, but following the Reformation in Denmark the convent fell on hard times and in 1541 it was demolished and the materials used for construction elsewhere. Brobjerg was mostly settled by the 1600s, but during the occupation by Sweden during the Torstenson War, many buildings were torn down to get constructionmaterials for the defensive Skansepalæet.

In 1824, Brobjerg was renamed Frederiksgade after the Danish king Frederik VI (1768–1839) who was involved in the restoration of the city gate Brobjerg Port. The king decided upon the design of the new city gate and in honor of his visit the gate was renamed Frederiksport and the street was named Frederiksgade. Brobjerg had become an important thoroughfare in the city, with many large merchanthouses built here over the years. However, in the 1800s it had fallen into disrepair and it was decided to renovate it. The old wooden bridge over the river was replaced by one of granite and by 1854 the project was completed.

Today, Frederiksgade has status of high-street with a commercial feel and many shops, boutiques, restaurants and bars. It is a major thoroughfare; the southern part is pedestrianized and the northern part is a cycle-street with priority for cyclists.

== Notable buildings ==
The most notable building on Frederiksgade is the listed building Herskind's House (Købmand Herskind's Gård). The house was built in approximately 1850 and was listed on the Danish registry of protected buildings and places by the Danish Heritage Agency on 2 October 1970. The building consists of the main building and two other wings; a half-timbered back building from 1726 and another smaller building facing the street. The buildings have been owned by a series of merchants who expanded the property at different times. In 1865 a connection was constructed between the main house and the south-wing and in 1858 a low north-wing was built.

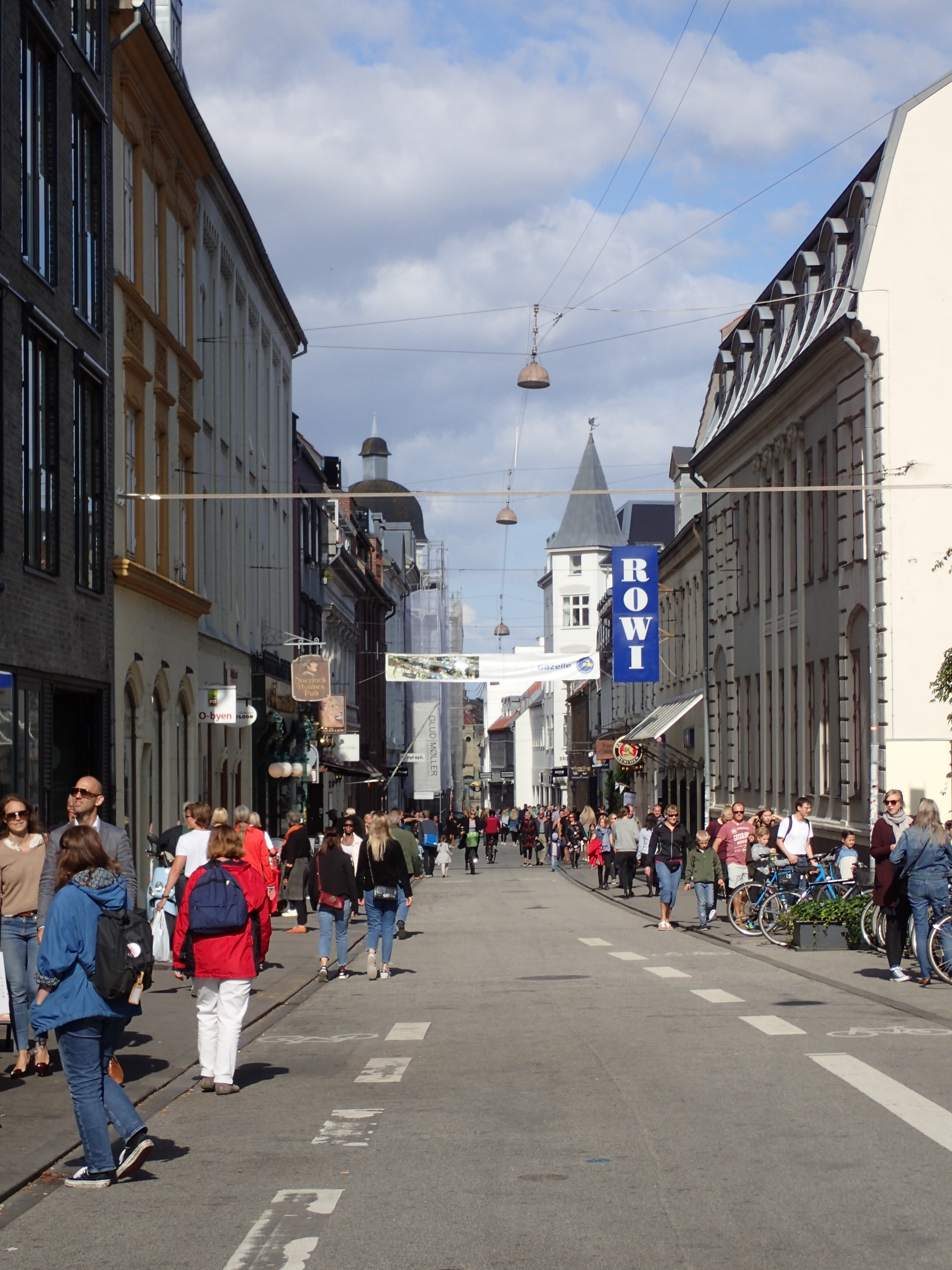
A look down Frederiksgade

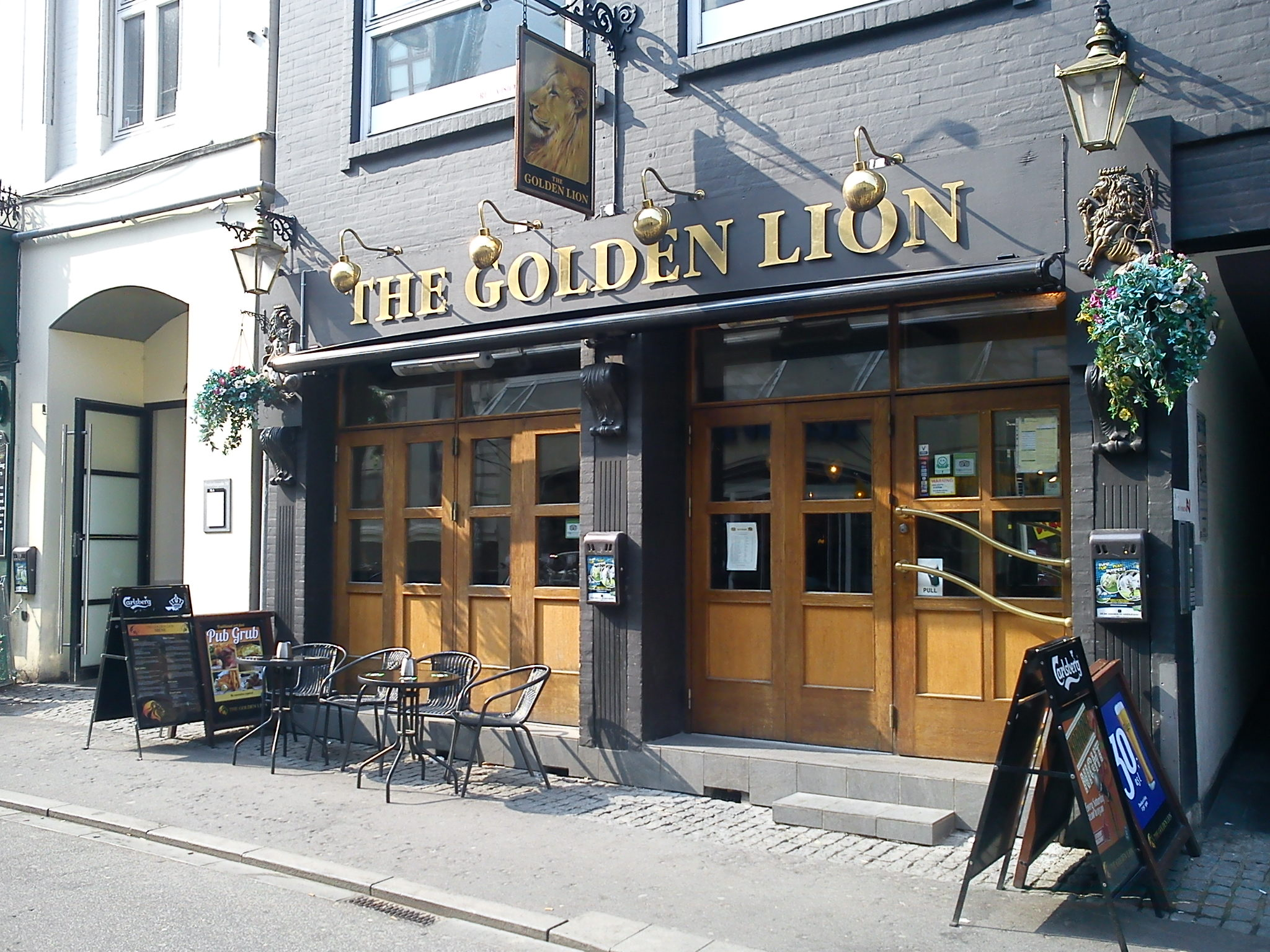
Many pubs and bars. The Golden Lion Pub

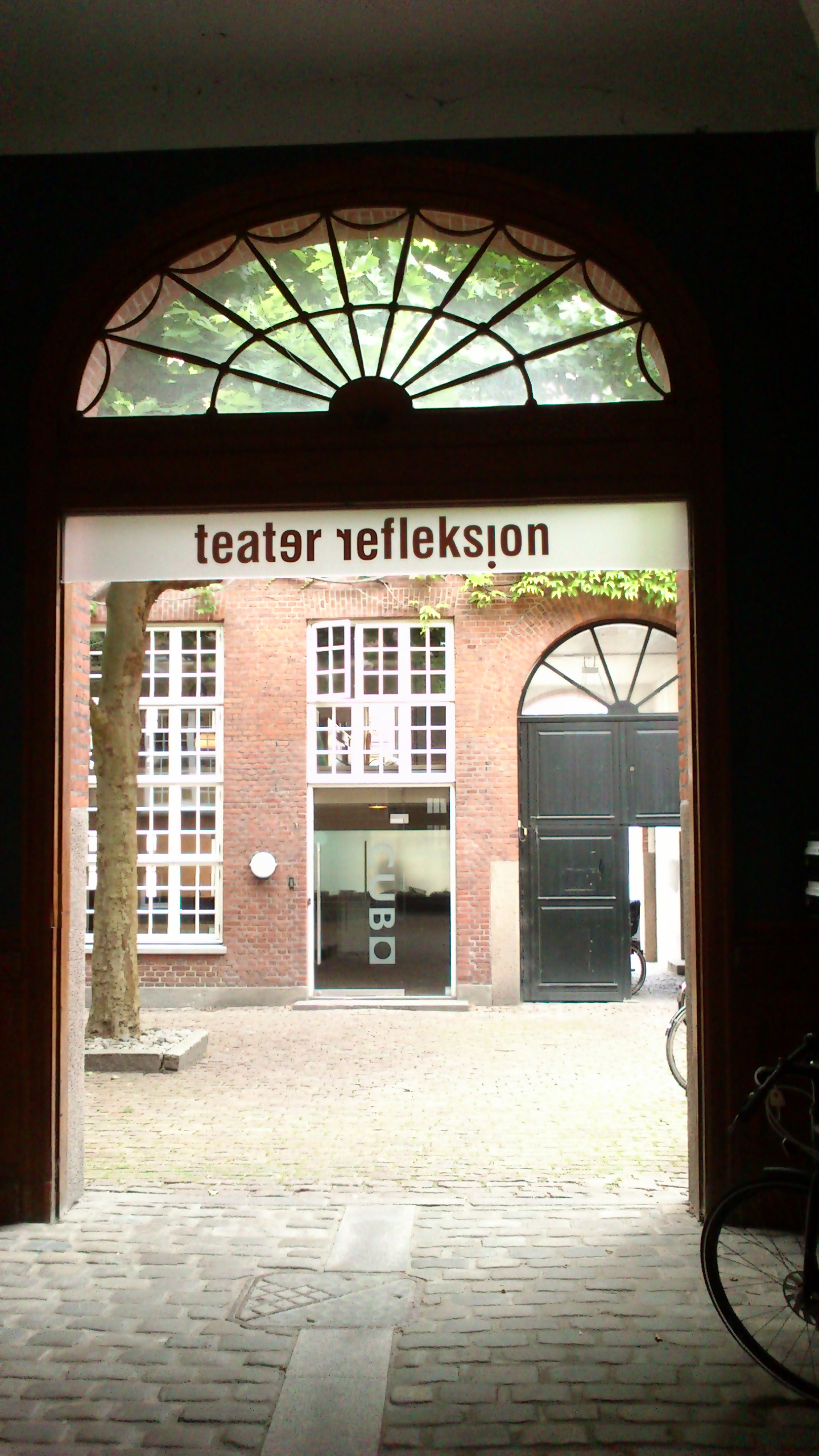
Several small backyards. The theatre of Teater Refleksion

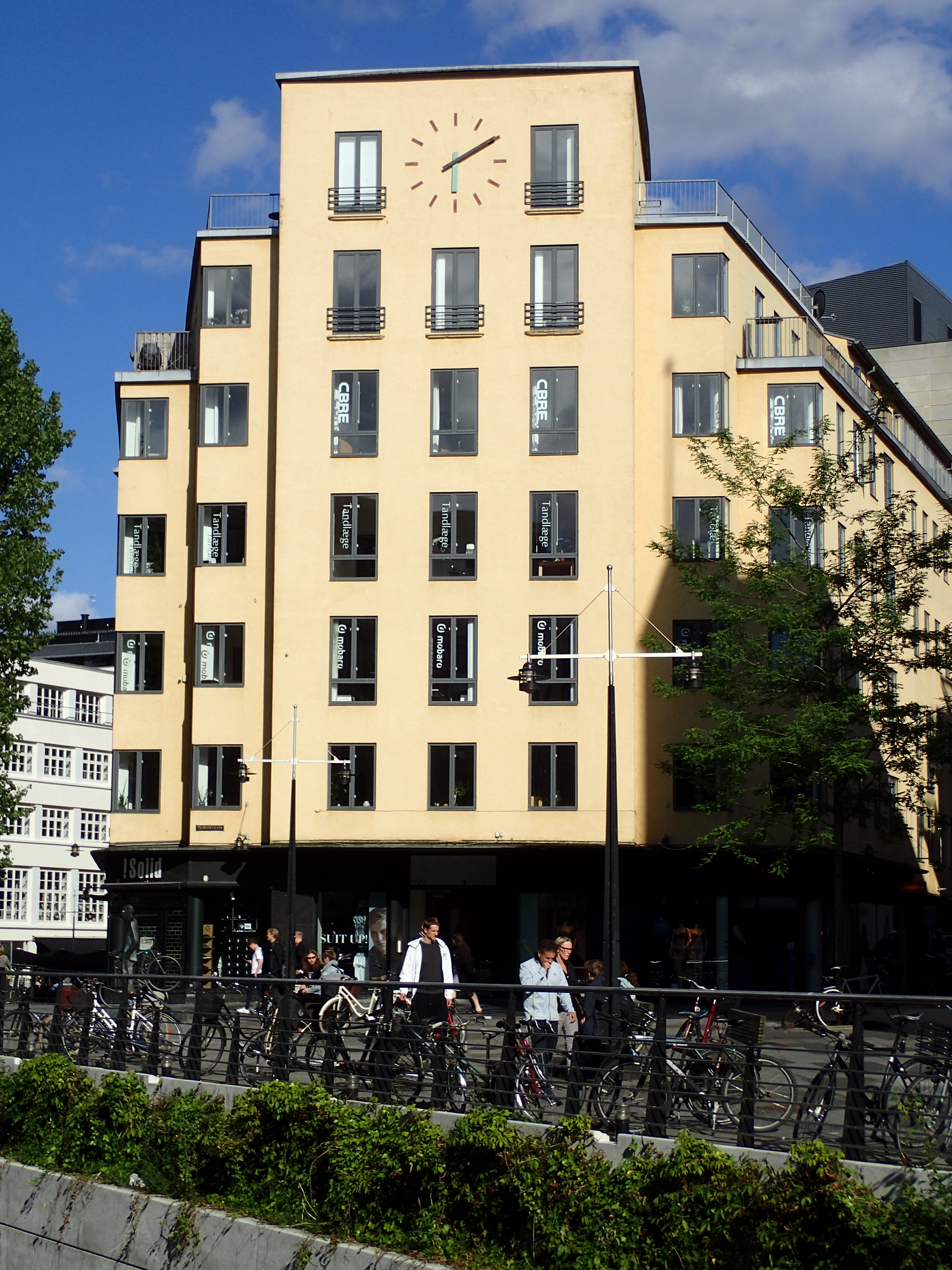
Frederiksgade no. 1
