= Immervad =

Street in Aarhus, Denmark

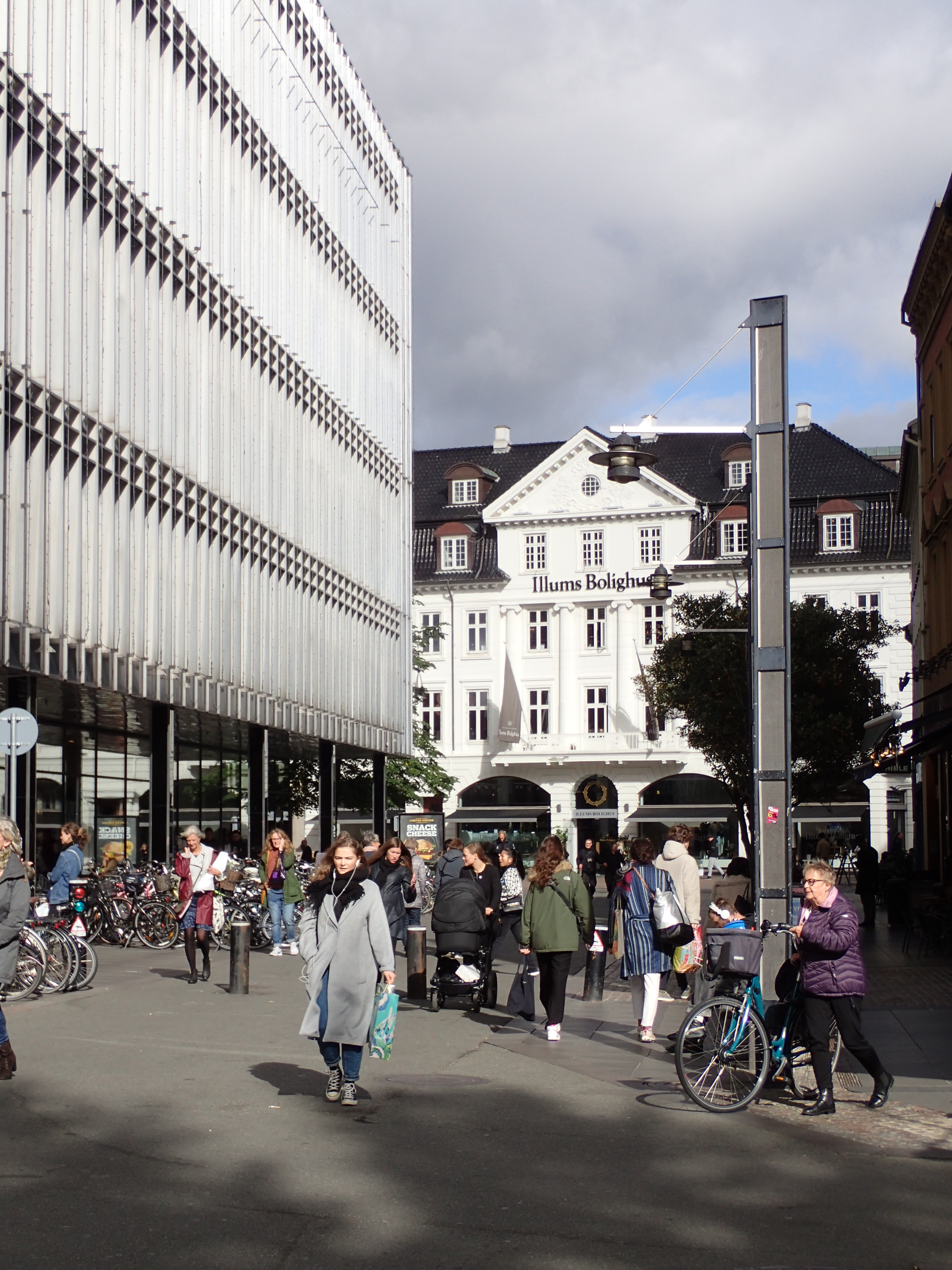
- Immervad towards Lille Torv with Magasin du Nord on the left
- Former name(s): Emmervad
- Length: 110 m (360 ft)
- Location: Latin Quarter, Aarhus, Denmark
- Postal code: 8000
- Coordinates: 56°09′25.6″N 10°12′25.6″E

Immervad, previously Emmervad, is a pedestrian street in Aarhus, Denmark, which runs north to south from Lille Torv to Åboulevarden and Frederiksgade. The alley Sankt Clemens Stræde leads to Immervad from the east. The street is situated in the historic Latin Quarter neighborhood and has existed as a road or street since the Viking Age when it was used as the eastern ford to cross the Aarhus River. Immervad is fairly short at just 110 meters long but it is one of the streets with the most foot traffic in Aarhus. At the southern section of the street is the bridge of Frederiksbroen, the first bridge built to cross the river in the city.

Immervad is home to Magasin du Nord, one of the largest department stores in Aarhus, and runs next to the recreational space of Vadestedet (The Ford) on the street of Åboulevarden which runs perpendicular to the southern end of Immervad.

== Etymology ==
The name Immervad is unique as a street name in Danish cities. The ending "vad" refers to the Danish word vadested (ford) while "Immer" is of unknown origin. It is possible Immer is the German word meaning "always", an allusion to a ford that can always be crossed. Another theory is that the original spelling Emmervad refers to a person named Emmer who may have lived by the ford. A third theory states that Emmer was the leftovers after creating slaked lime, used to stabilize the river floor at the ford. However, there are also indications that the name was not known in the Middle Ages as sources from 1512 mentions the street as "the street to the bridge".

== Frederiks Bridge ==
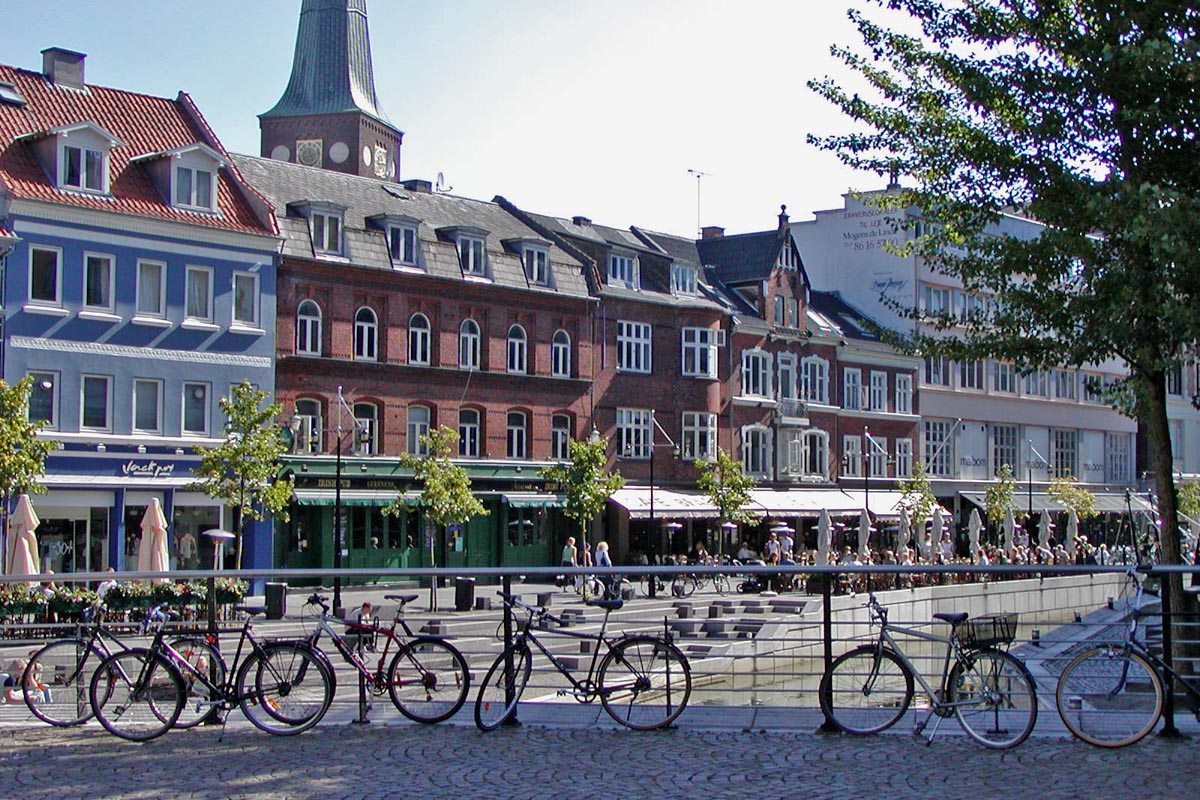
Frederiksbroen across Aarhus River

The southern section of Immervad is the bridge Frederiks Bro or Frederiksbroen. It is not known exactly when Frederiks Bro was built but it existed in the 1400s when Brobjerg on the south side of the bridge was settled. The bridge was early on known as Brobjerg Bro (Brobjerg Bridge) and from the 1600s to 1824 as Basballe Bro after one of the prominent merchant families that lived on Immervad at the time. In 1824 the street south of the bridge was renamed Frederiksgade after King Frederik VI who visited Aarhus at the time and at the same time the bridge was renamed to Frederiks Bro. In the 1930s the section of the river which runs through the city proper was paved over and the bridge was dismantled. In 1989 Aarhus City Council officially adopted a policy to reopen the river and between 2005 and 2008 the section from Immervad to Vester Allé was reopened and a bridge reestablished. The name Frederiks Bro is not a well known in daily parlance as a much larger and more prominent bridge on Frederiks Allé carries the same name.

== Buildings ==
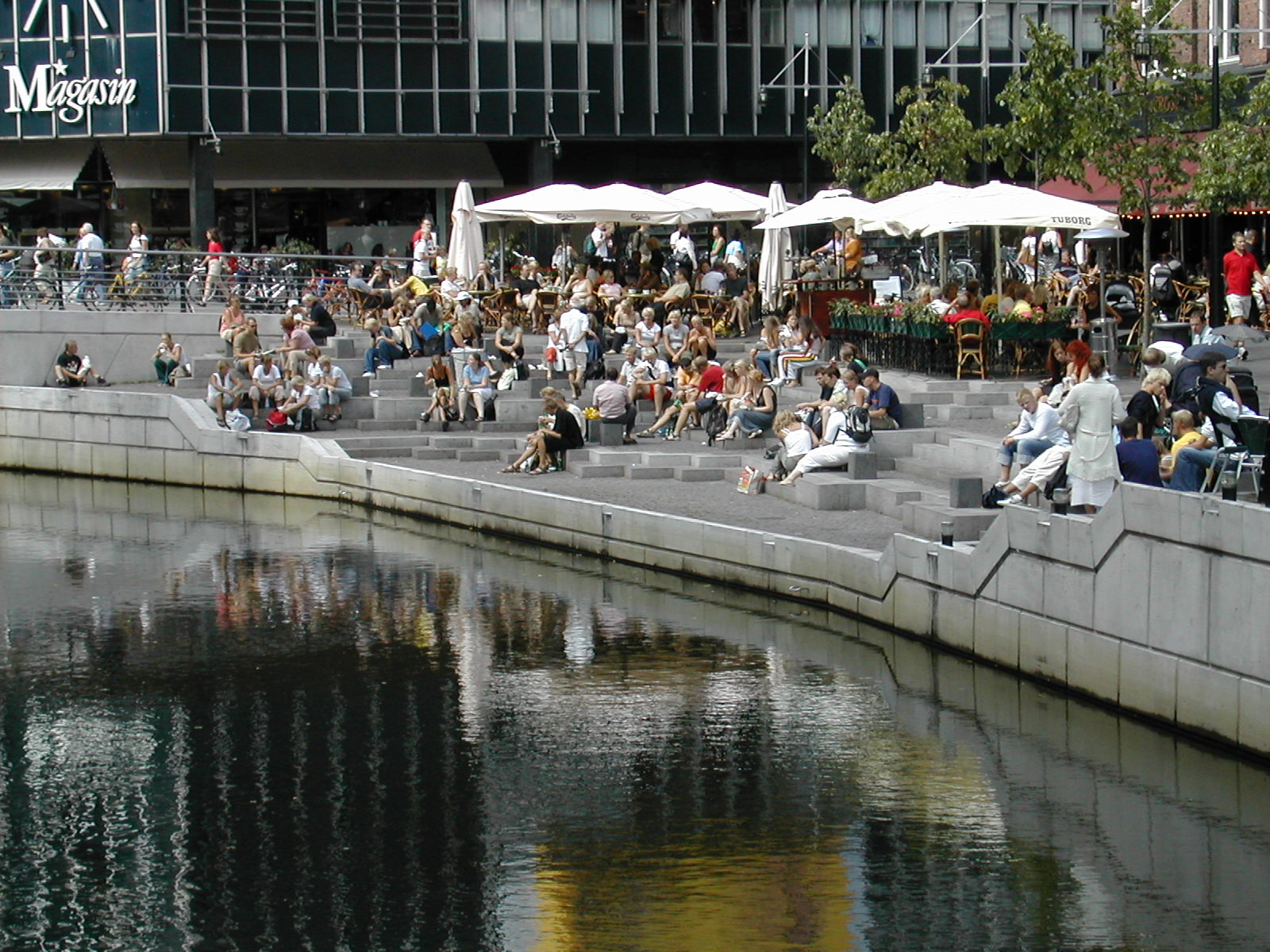
Vadestedet. Immervad runs parallel to the Magasin department store.

In the Middle Ages the street was home to "helligåndshuset" (House of the Holy Ghost), part hospital, part nursing home and part gust house, but the building fell into disrepair after the reformation and was eventually replaced by a large merchant's building. Immervad was situated close to some of the main thoroughfares in the city such as Vestergade and the river harbor so it was an ideal location for merchants to establish themselves. By the late Middle Ages Immervad was characterized by a number of large and prominent merchants mansions with warehouses, stables etc. Few of these buildings remain today although the adjacent Maren Smeds Gyde contains a warehouse from that period. The largest and most prominent mansion was built in 1597 and was through time inhabited by several of the mayors of the city until it was bought by the merchant Poul Pedersen Frausing in 1788. The building remained in the Frausing family until 1901 when it was taken down and moved to Tangkrogen for the Danish National Exhibition of 1909 to serve as a museum. It subsequently became the first building in the Old Town Museum, known as the Mayor's Mansion.

In 1871 the store Magasin du Nord moved from Vestergade to Immervad where it has been situated ever since. The store has been expanded a number of times and in the 1960s the current complex was built, dominating the western side of the street. Today the street is dominated by the large department store from the 60s and 70s on the west side and older buildings on the east side.

== Bibliography ==
- Sejr, Emanuel (1960). Gamle Århusgader – Første samling. Århus Byhistoriske Udvalg. ISBN 87-504-0353-2. Archived from the original on 2022-01-16.
- Weinreich, Mogens (2007). Kend din by II. Østjysk Hjemstavnsforening. ISBN 978-8-79856-816-2. Archived from the original on 2022-02-24.
