= Åboulevarden =

Street in Aarhus, Denmark

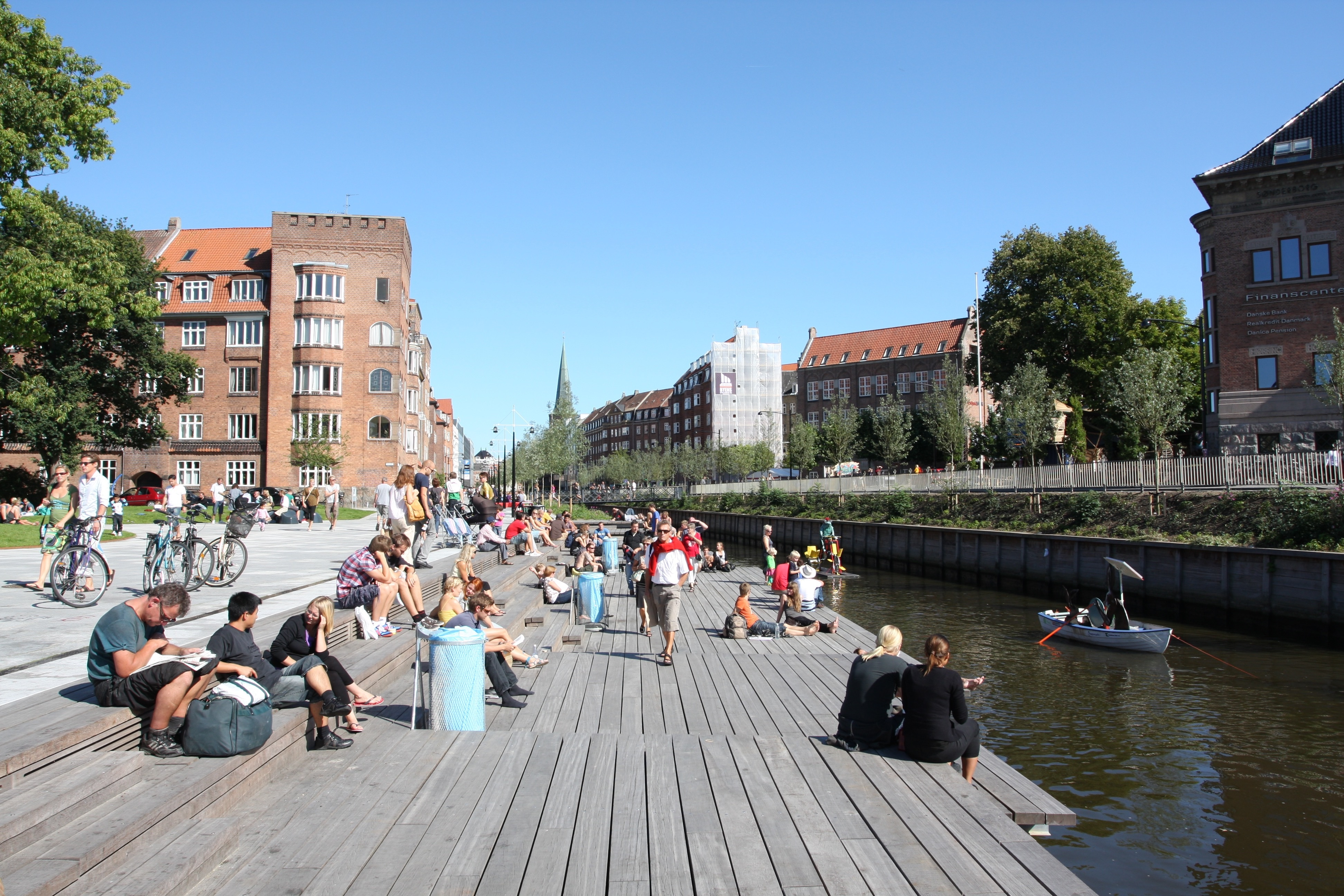
- Åboulevarden by Mølleparken
- Length: 975 m (3,199 ft)
- Location: Indre by, Aarhus, Denmark
- Postal code: 8000
- Coordinates: 56°09′21.4″N 10°12′13.1″E

Åboulevarden is a street and promenade in Aarhus, Denmark. It is 975 meters long and runs west to east from Vester Allé to Europaplads at Dokk1. The street is situated in the Indre by neighborhood where it is a popular thoroughfare for pedestrians. The center contains Aarhus river which splits the street in a north and south side. The north side is pedestrianized in its entire length and contains the park Mølleparken and the recreational space Vadestedet (The Ford). The south side has a road on the western third, providing access to Emil Vetts Passage, Busgaden and the parking complex for Magasin du Nord. The east section is one of the most popular areas in the city for outdoor congregation, packed with bars and cafés.

== History ==
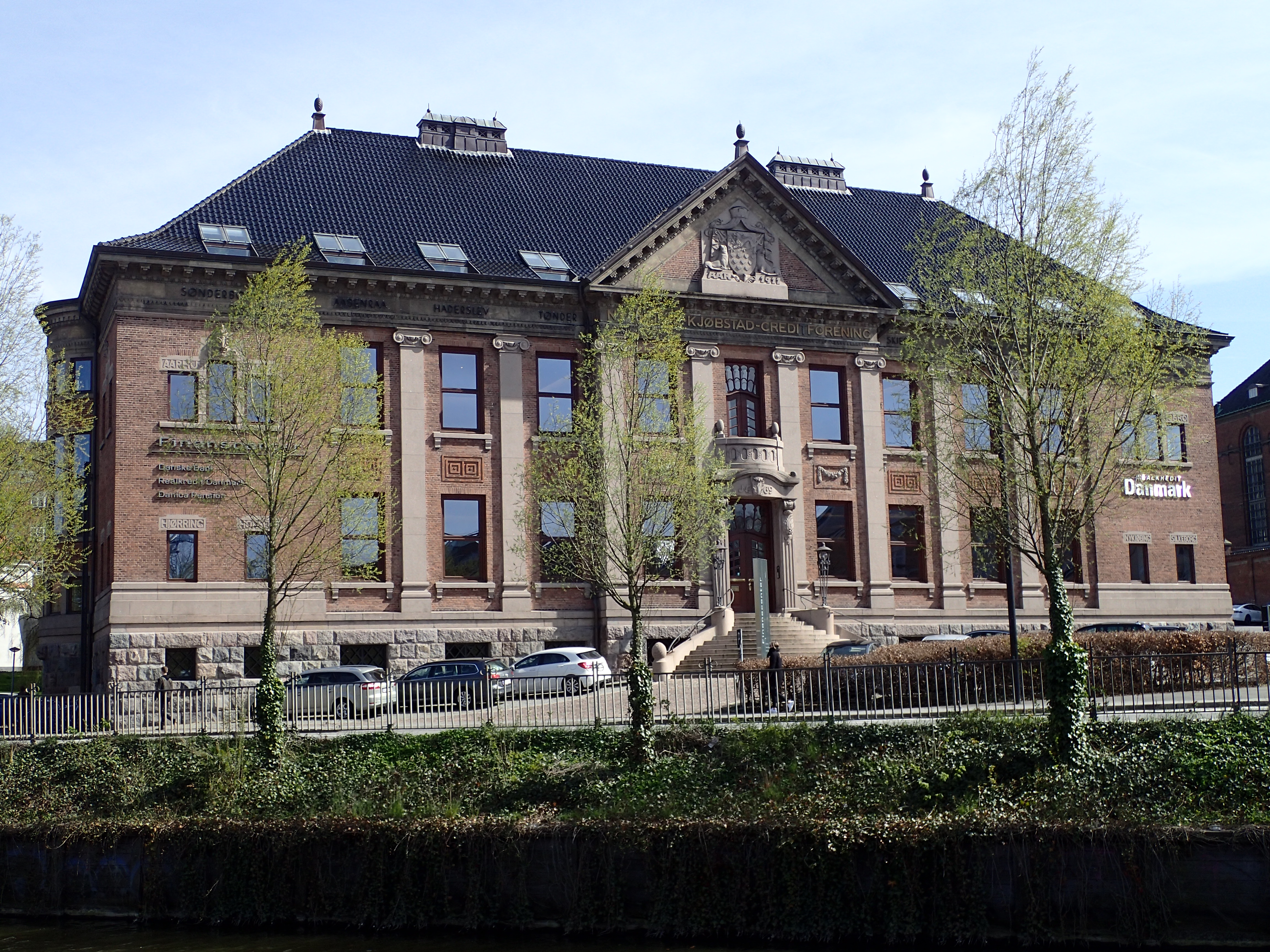
"Ny jydske Kjøbstad-Creditforening", a credit union headquarters, from 1912

Aarhus originates as a Viking fort that was defended by moats and ramparts up to the Middle Ages. The precursor to Åboulevarden stems from 1477 when king Christian I gave permission to develop the southern ramparts along the river and houses were built on it. In 1674 a narrow alley along the river was transformed into a wider street which was named Aagade (Literal translation.: River Street) running from Immervad to Skolegade. Åboulevarden was constructed between 1898 and 1934 along the river on the streets Aagade and Louisegade, running from Vester Allé to Christiansgade. At the coast it was extended further through a now non-existent street known as Revet and finally to Dynkarken and Europaplads where it ends.

Between 1930 and 1958 the river was paved over in order to widen Åboulevarden and allow for parking in the center. In connection with this redevelopment the street was named Åboulevarden. Originally only the section that was Aagade was supposed to be named Åboulevarden but member of the city council and editor of the newspaper Demokraten proposed using the name for the entire stretch which was approved, thus eliminating Louisegade as a street name. In 1989 Aarhus city council decided the river should be opened again. It took 16 years, until September 2005, before work began and another 2½ years for the section along Immervad to Vester Allé to be opened. On 28 June 2008 the new section of river was inaugurated and work on the last section from Mindebrogade to the harbor front began. The last section was finished in the fall of 2015.

== The Ford ==
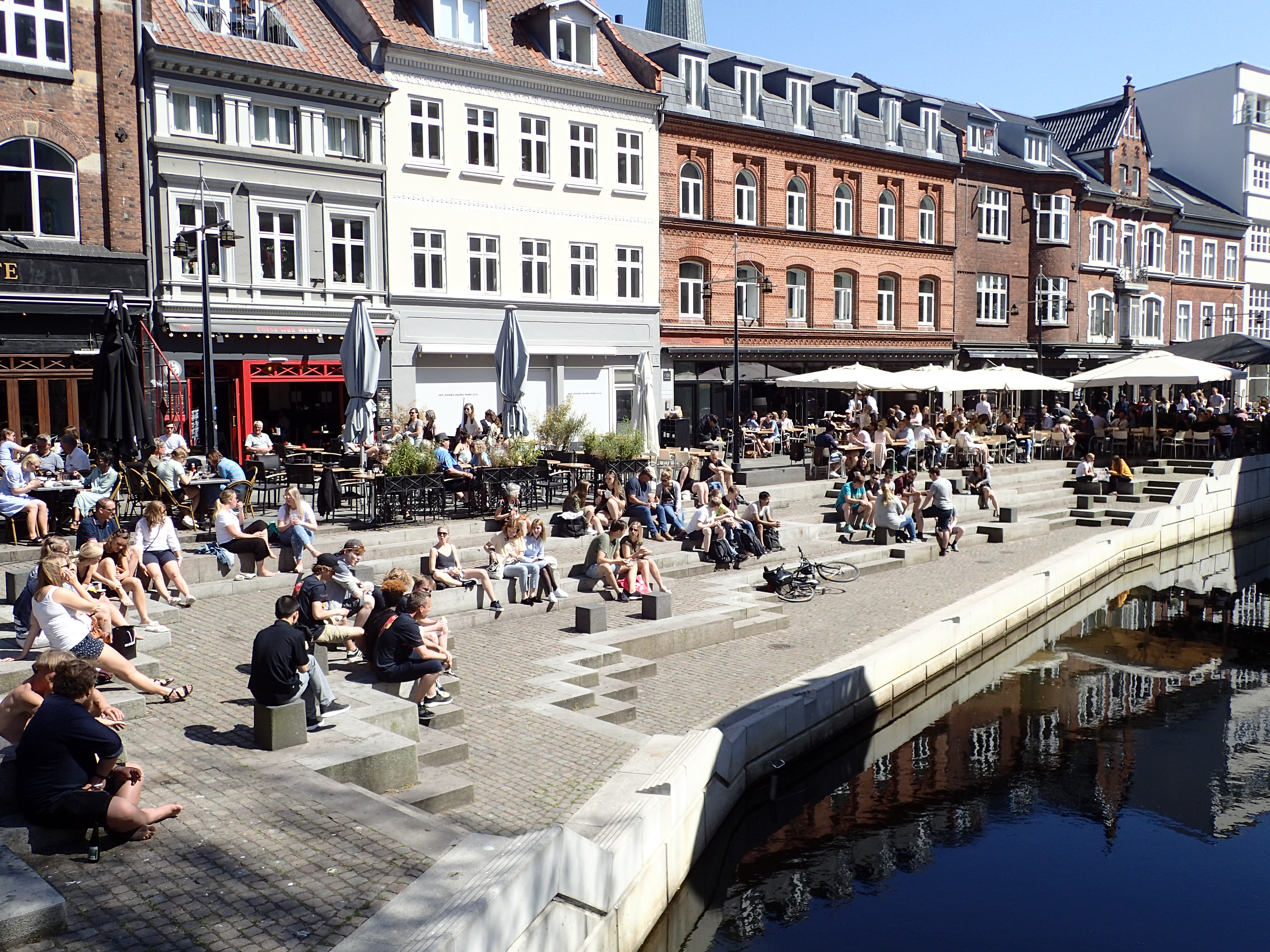
Vadestedet

When the river was opened in the 2000s the opportunity to create a new recreational space near the water was realized with the project that became known as Vadestedet (The Ford). The name refers to a ford that used to lead over the river by Immervad. When the river was opened a bridge was established there to connect Frederiksgade to Immervad. Next to the bridge a system of steps was created by the river, initially known as Den Spanske Trappe (The Spanish Steps) in reference to the steps in Rome, but today officially named Vadestedet. The steps lead to the edge of the river and are designed with seating. The Ford has become one of the most popular areas for outdoor recreation in the city and is packed with people in the evenings and when in the daytime when weather permits. The area east of the Ford is packed with bars and cafés and functions as a small leisure district in its own right.

== Gallery ==
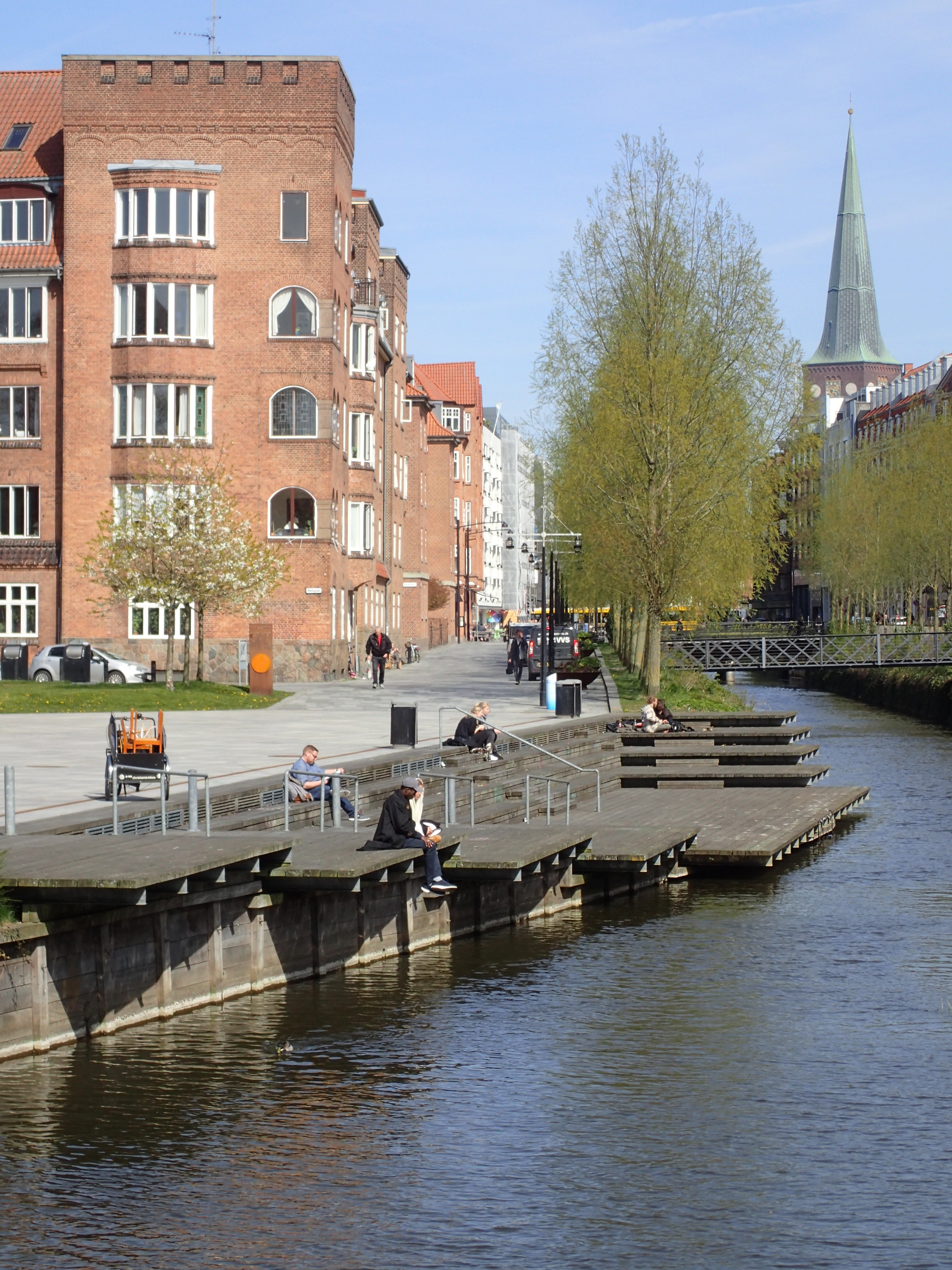

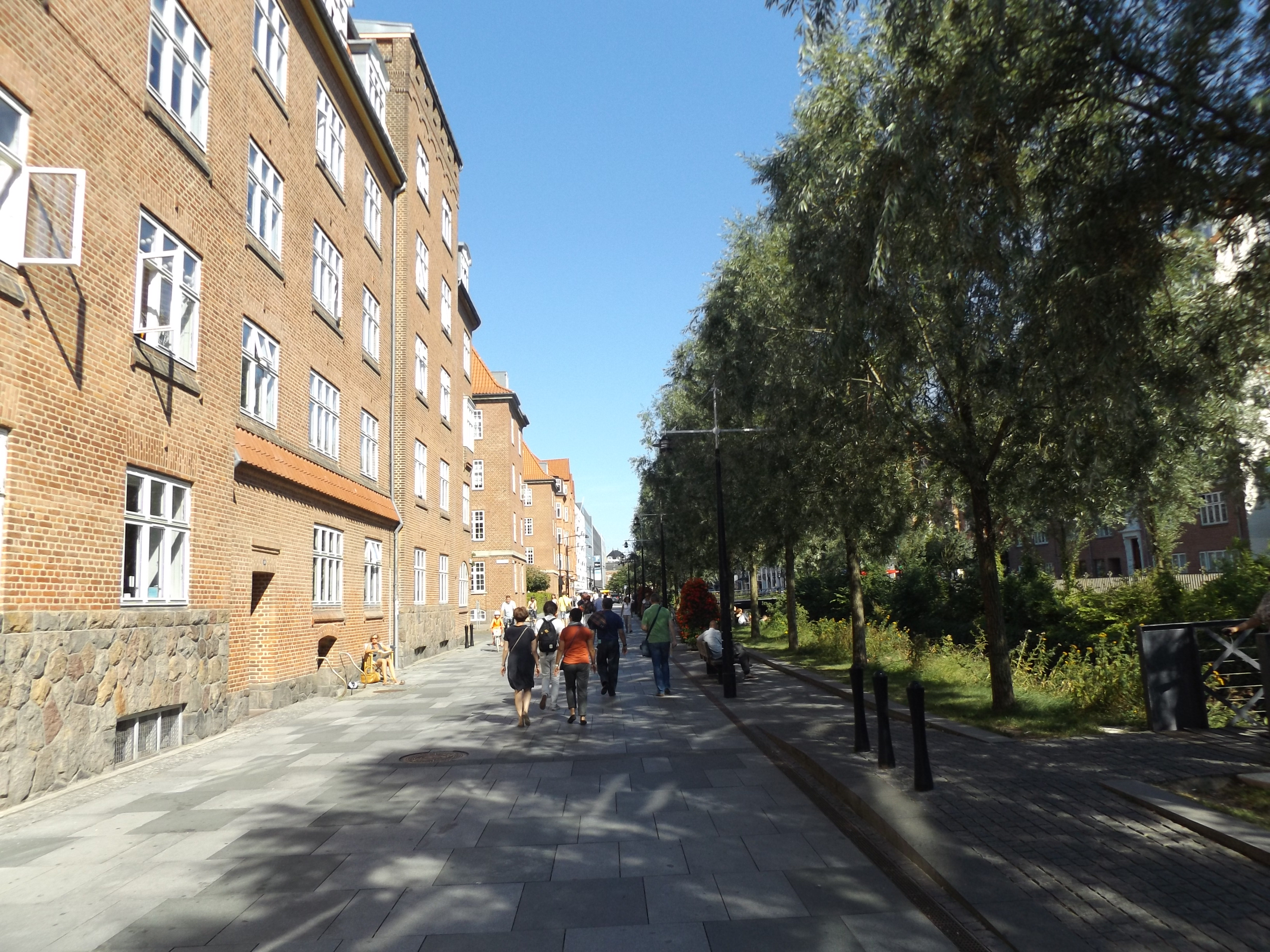

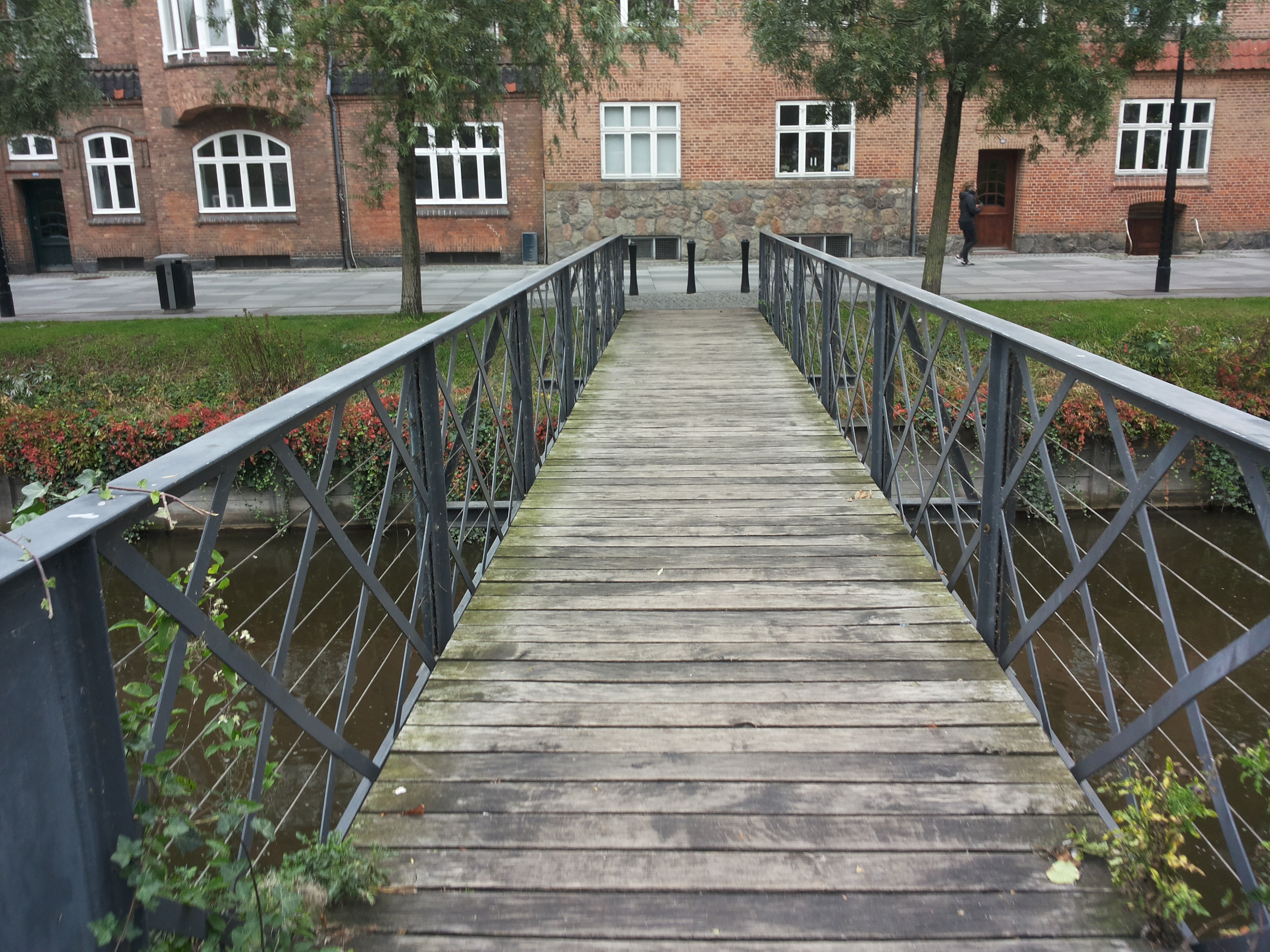

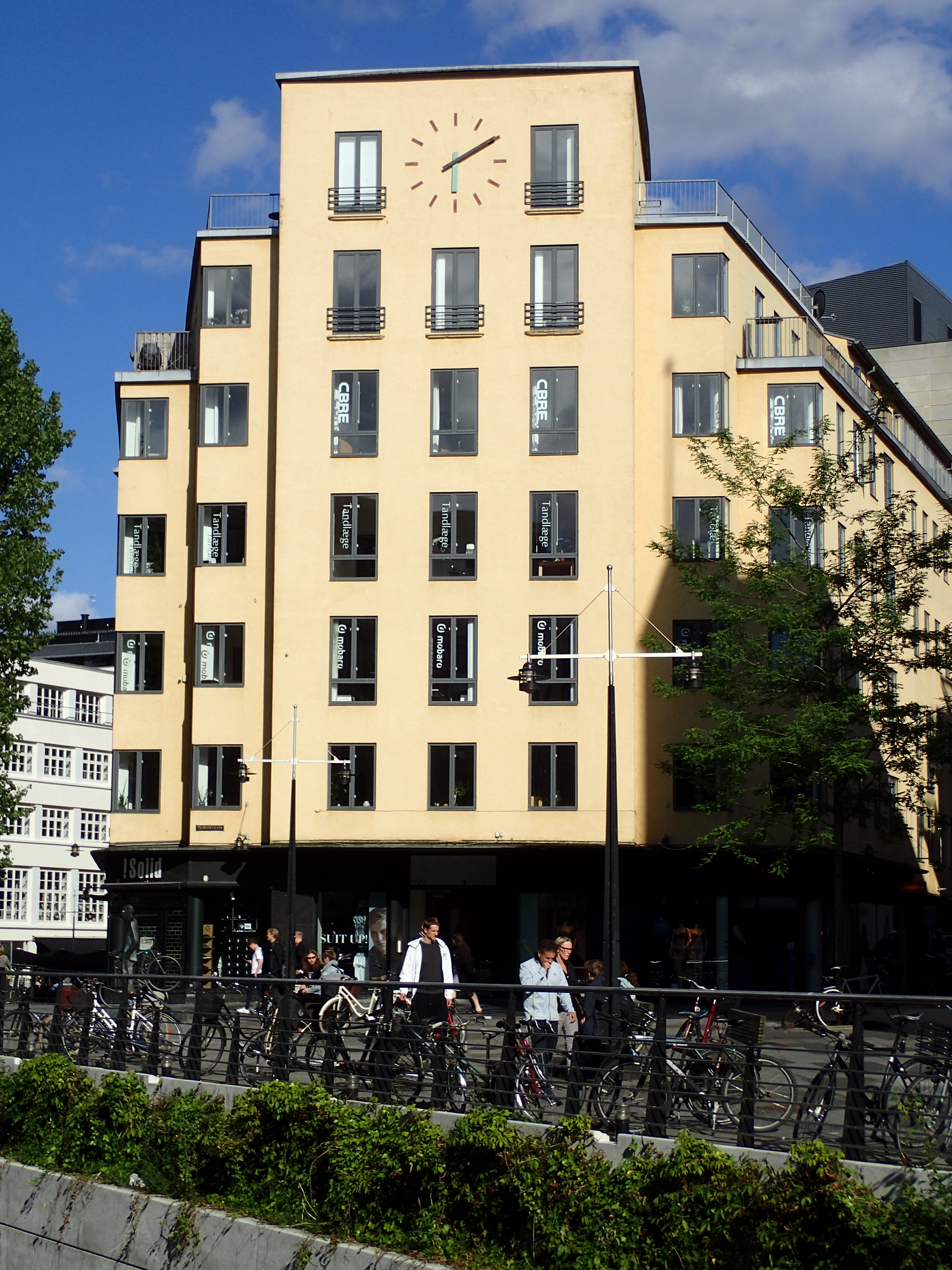

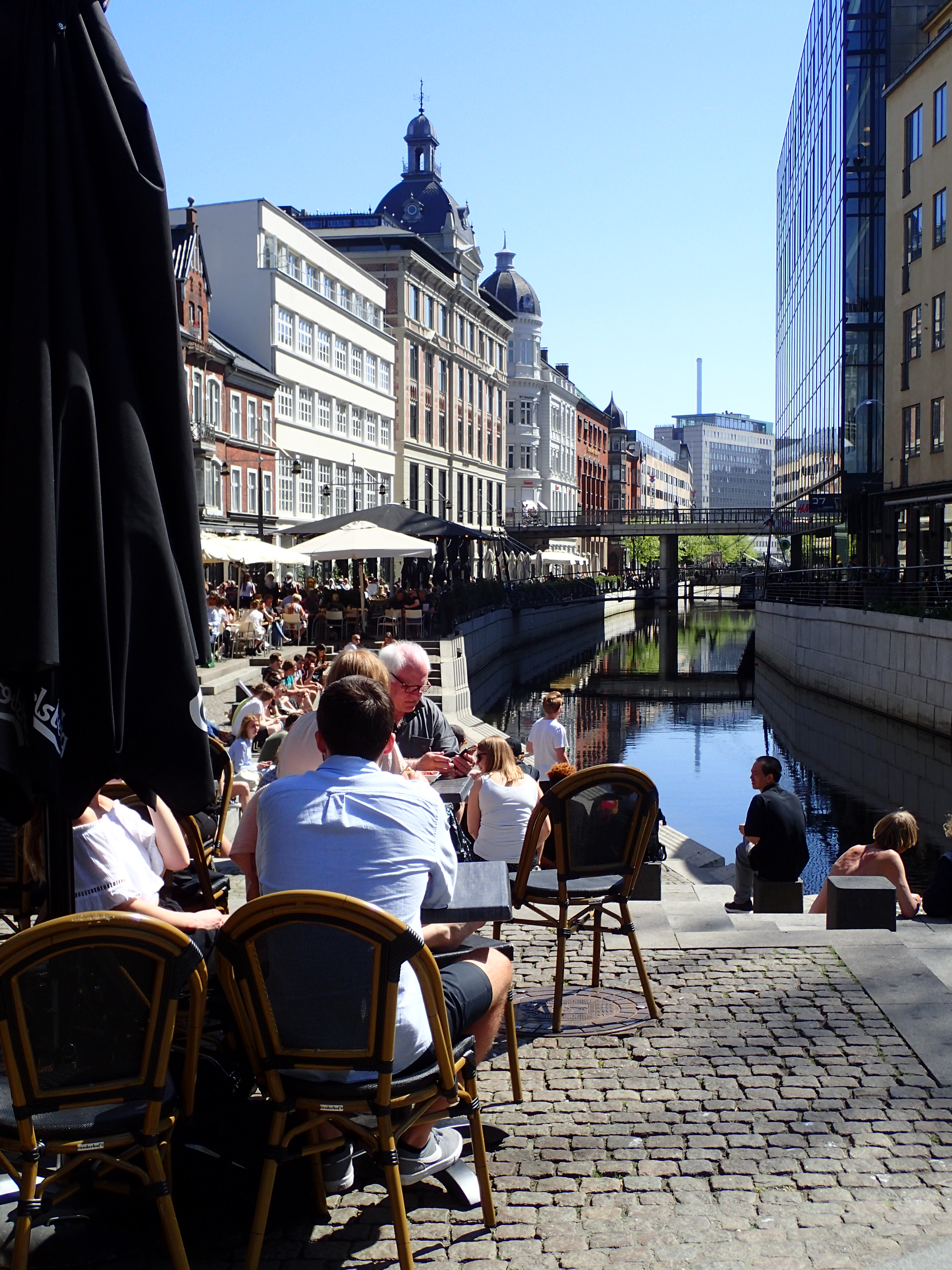

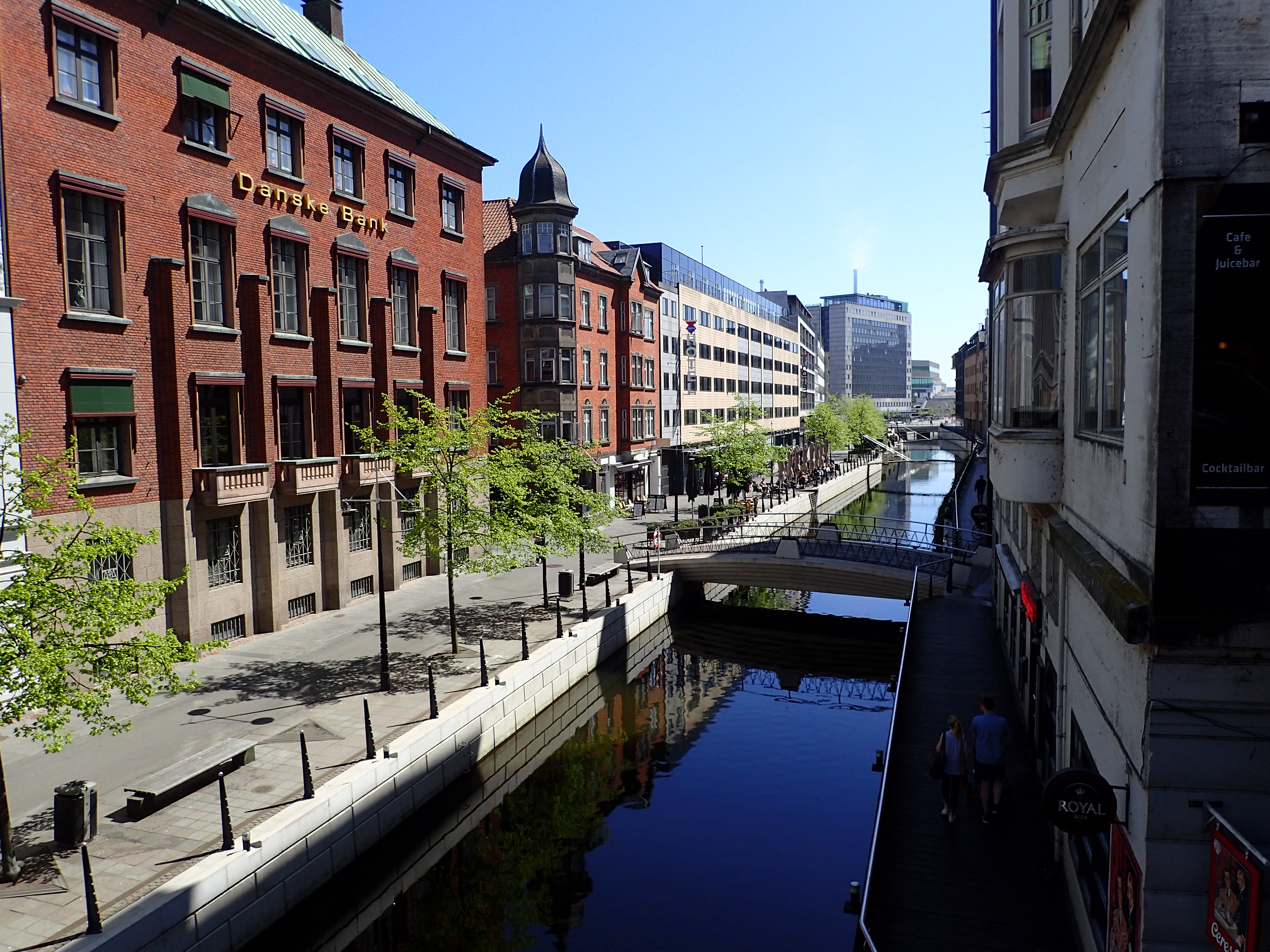

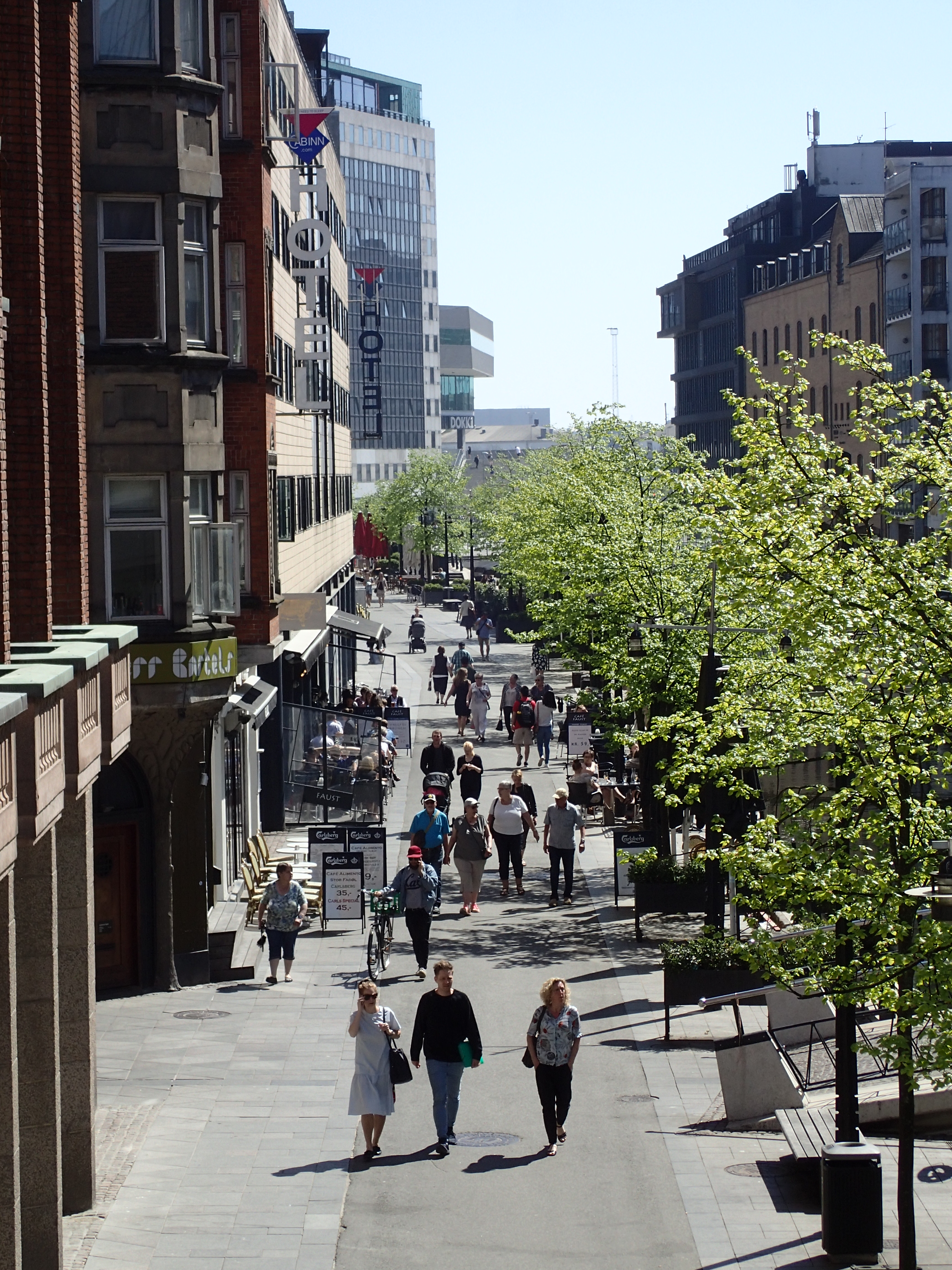
