= Indre By, Aarhus =

Neighborhood in the city of Aarhus, Denmark

Indre By
- Neighborhood
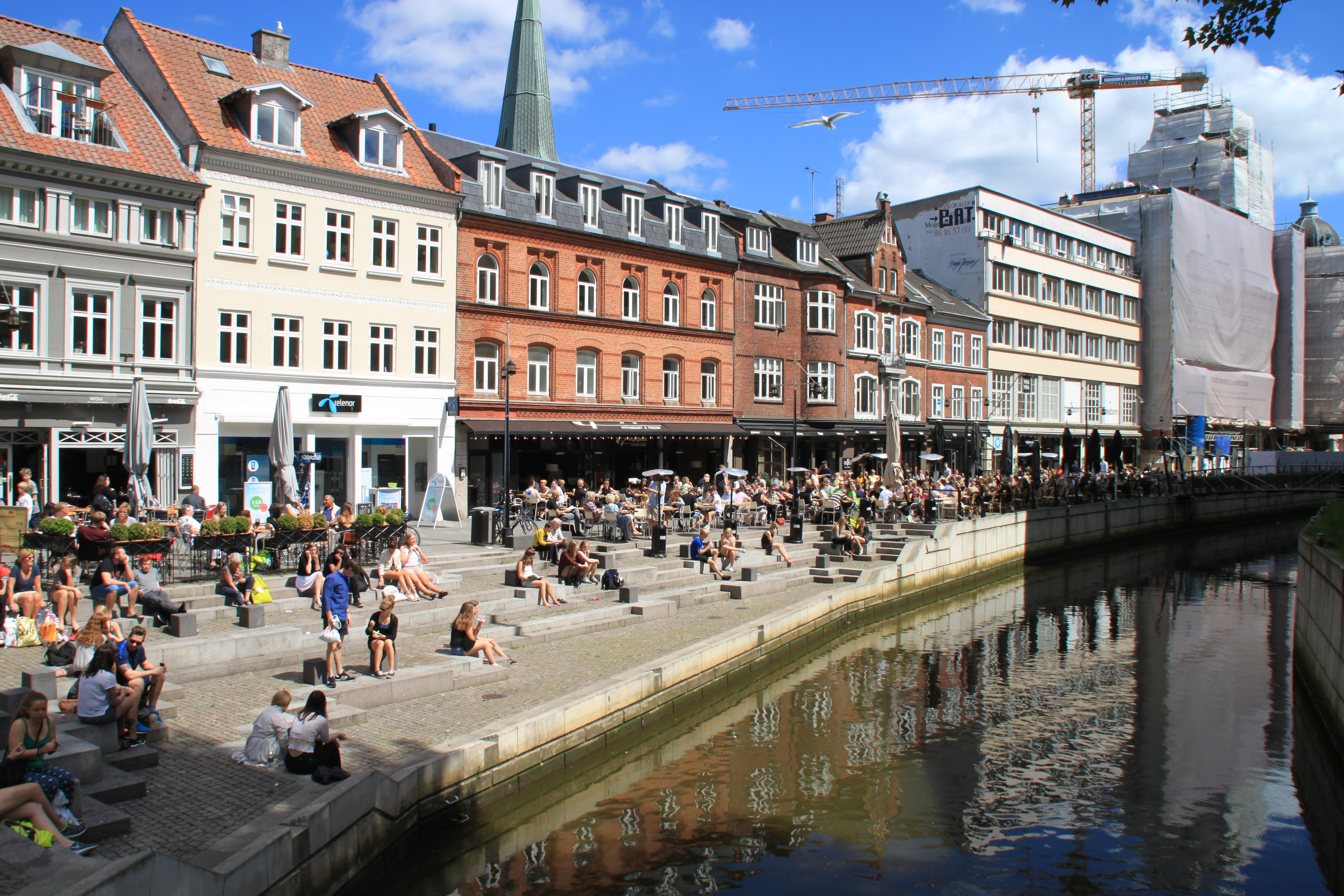
- Åboluevarden in Midtbyen

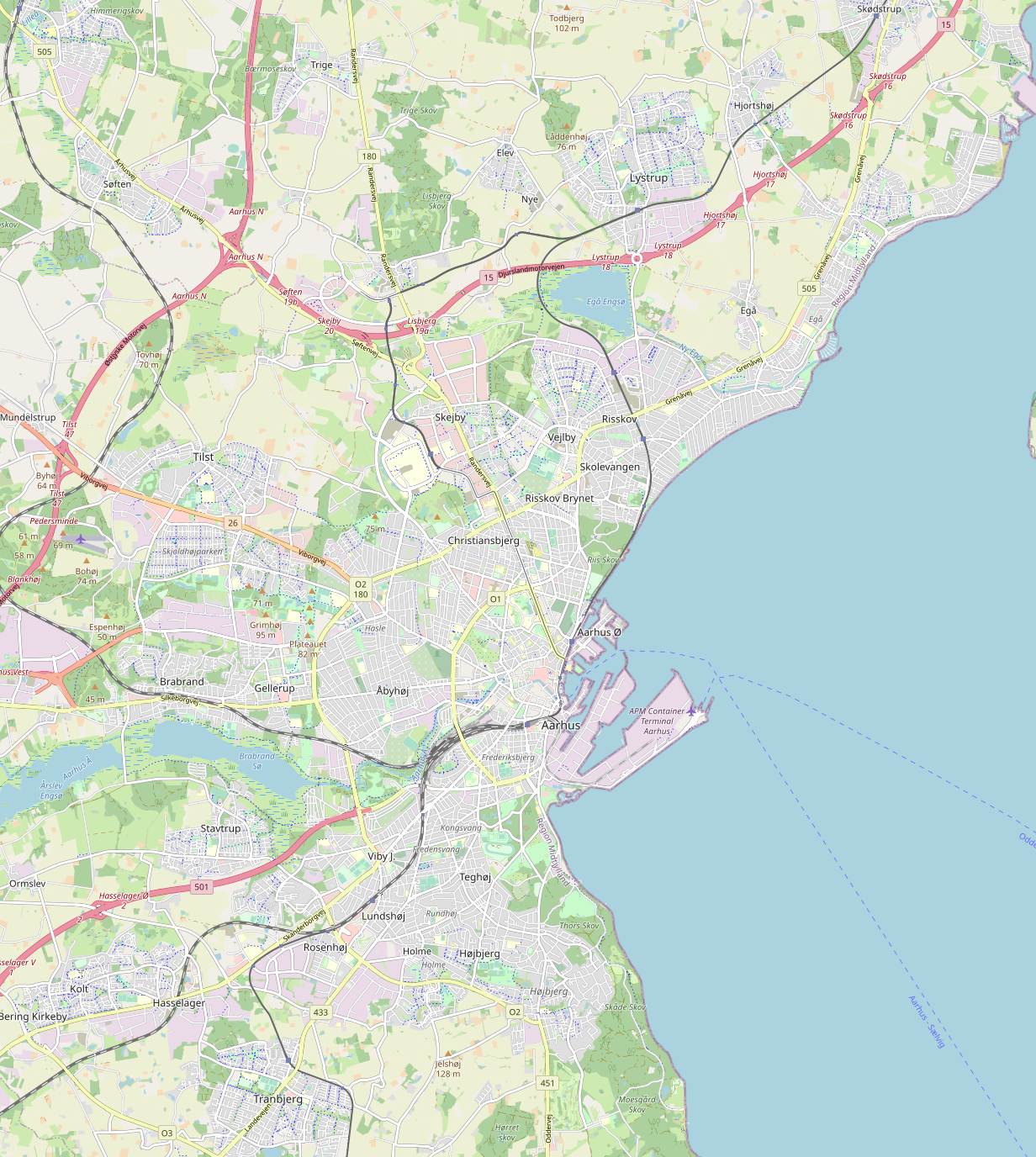
- Location within Aarhus
- Coordinates: 56.159497°N 10.207834°E
- Country: Kingdom of Denmark
- Regions of Denmark: Central Denmark Region
- Municipality: Aarhus Municipality
- District: Aarhus C
- Postal code: 8000

Indre By (Inner City) is a neighborhood in the city of Aarhus, Denmark. The neighborhood is bounded by Nørre Allé, Vester Allé and Sønder Allé and is composed of the neighborhood and historical centre of the Latin Quarter and the areas around the Central Station and the City Hall Park. The neighborhood is one of the three main neighborhoods in the district of Aarhus C, along with Frederiksbjerg and Vesterbro.

Indre By is composed of areas from different time periods. The historical centre, the Latin Quarter and the areas surrounding it, is the oldest section of Aarhus with structures dating back to the 16th century and it contains many of the listed buildings in Aarhus. The area is characterized by narrow, curved streets – some of which are cobbled – such as Badstuegade, Klostergade and Volden. The central square of Pustervig Torv was constructed in conjunction with a public works project in the 1960s, to open the narrow streets up for public bus transport. Nowadays the square serves a more recreational purpose with cafés, restaurants and occasional events, and very limited traffic. Today the Latin Quarter contains many fashion and specialty shops, cafés and theatres as well as the art cinema Øst for Paradis (East of Eden) and Hotel Royal. In the 1990s, the Aarhus River was stripped from its long time road cover at the street of Åboulevarden, and its regained exposure has inspired a whole new riverside quarter, packed with cafés and bars.

The historical centre extends to the Central Station by Ryesgade, the busiest commercial pedestrian street in Denmark. The Central Station and the area around it was developed in the 1920s and is characterized by wide streets and large yellow brick buildings with mansard roofs and avant-corps in Neoclassical style. The area around the Concert Hall presents a variety of differing architectural styles within a small area. Buildings from the former barracks Vester Allés Kaserne from 1878 in National Romantic style is next to the 2004 large square red brick Aros Art Museum building Kuben (The Cube) with the colorful promenade "Your Rainbow Panorama" on the roof. Next to them the modernistic glass encased Concert Hall from 1982 contrasts the 1940s marble clad City Hall across from the City Hall Park.

== History ==
Indre By comprise the area of original Aarhus, founded in the 8th century during the Viking Age. The oldest historical parts along the coast and river were enclosed by defensive ramparts from 934 until their final removal in 1477. The streets of Volden (The Rampart) and Graven (The Moat) were built on parts of the former defences.

== Gallery ==
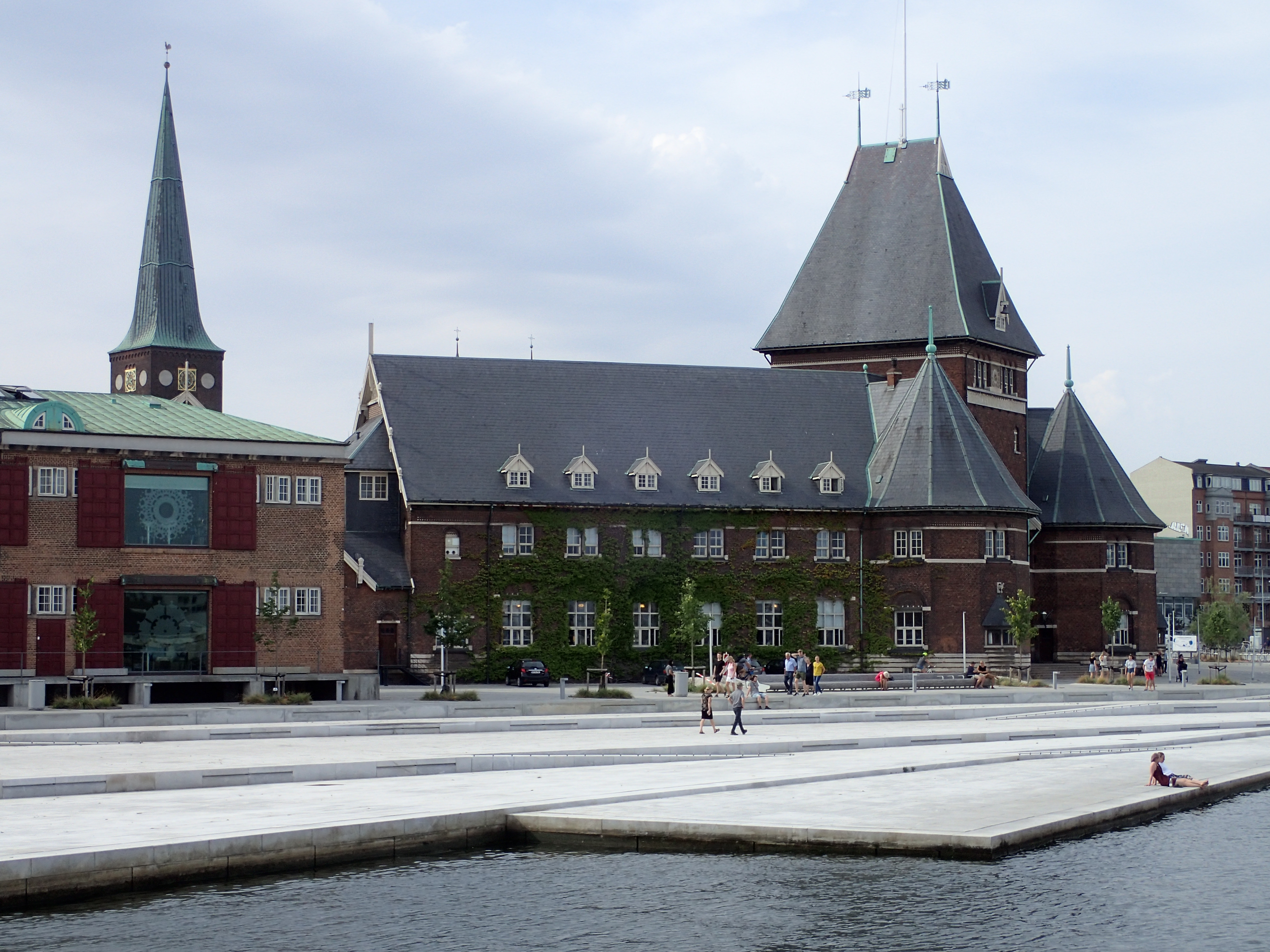
Redeveloped harbourside

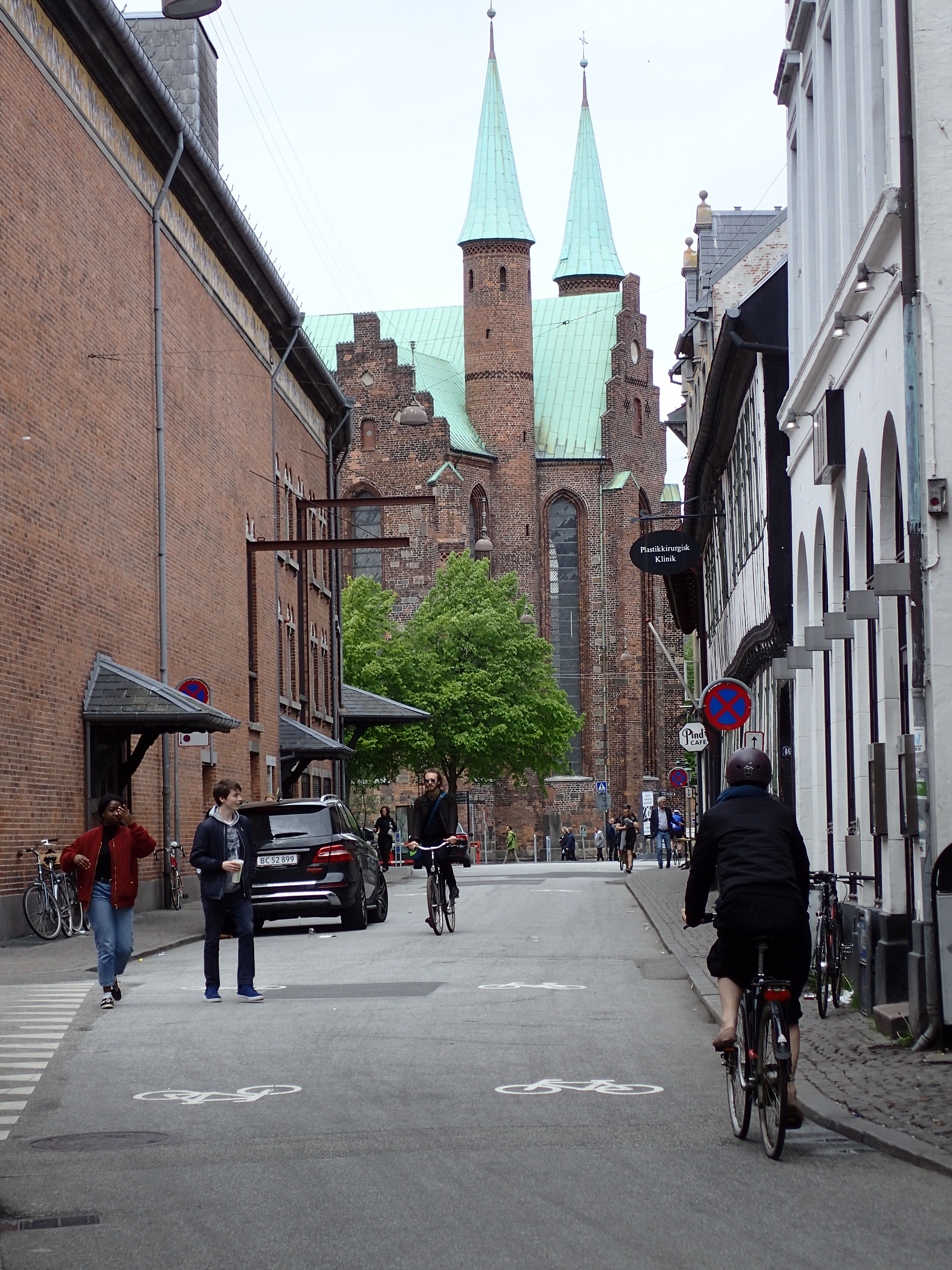
Bikeways

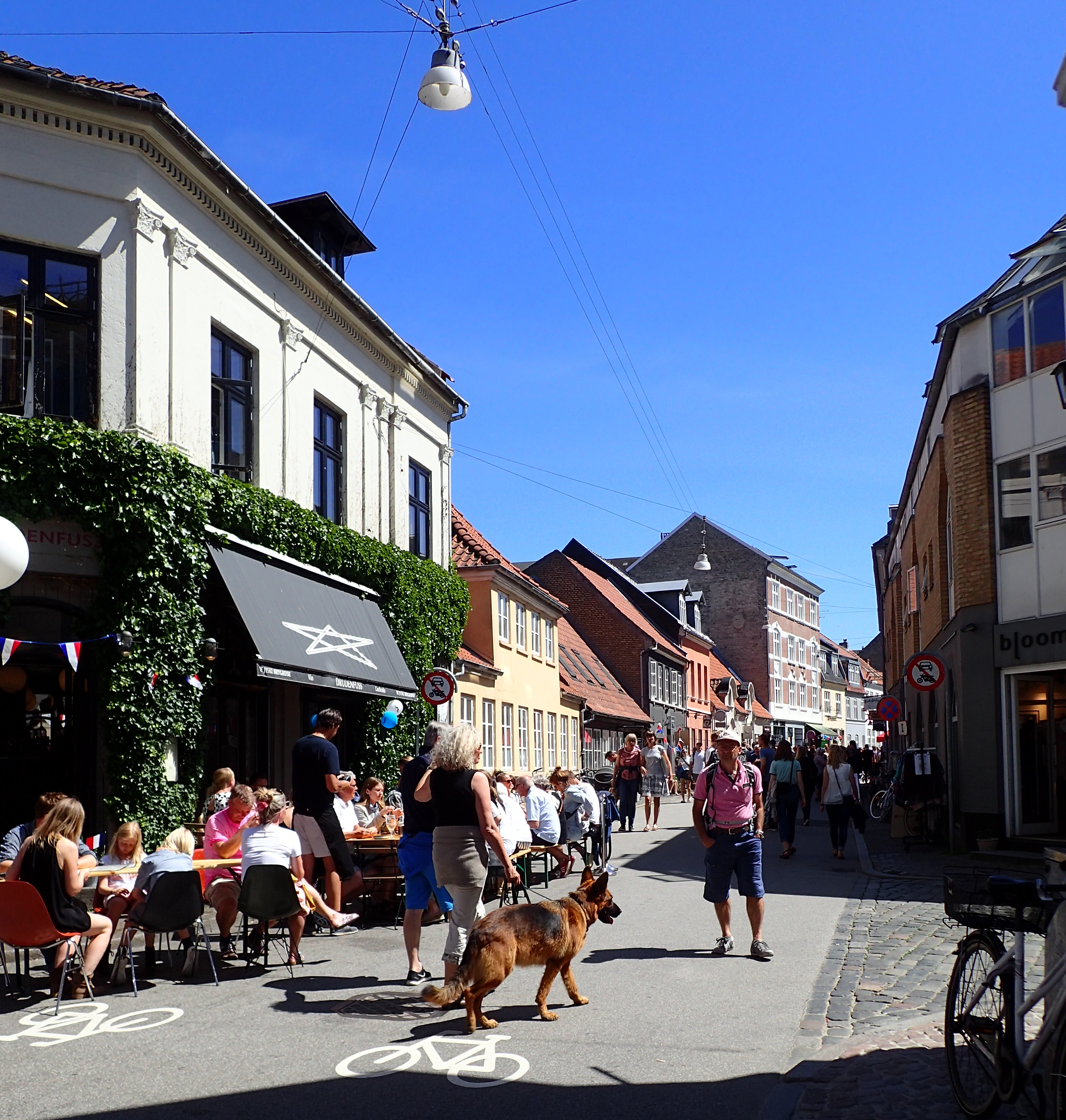
Street life and cafés

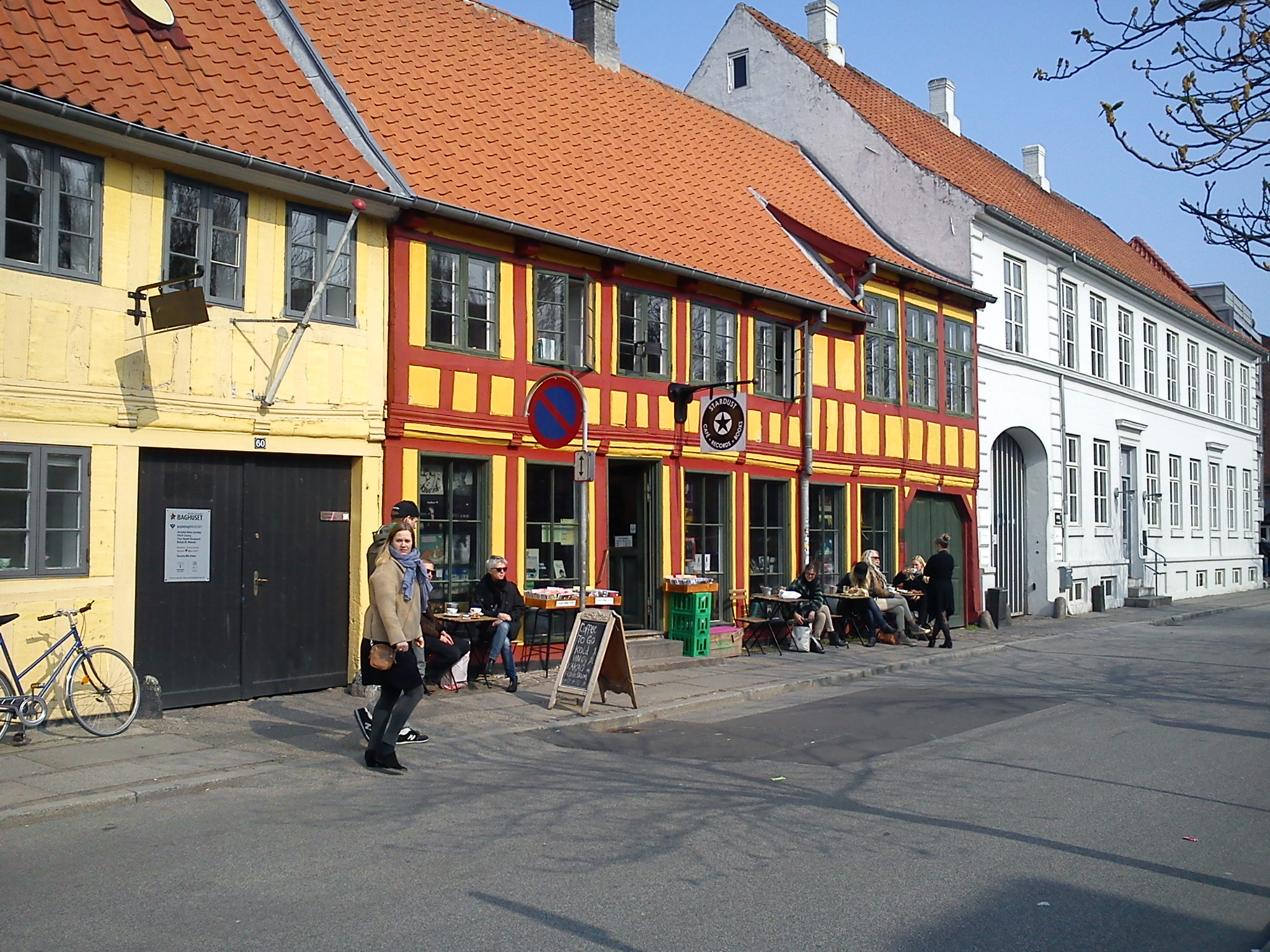
Timber-framed medieval buildings

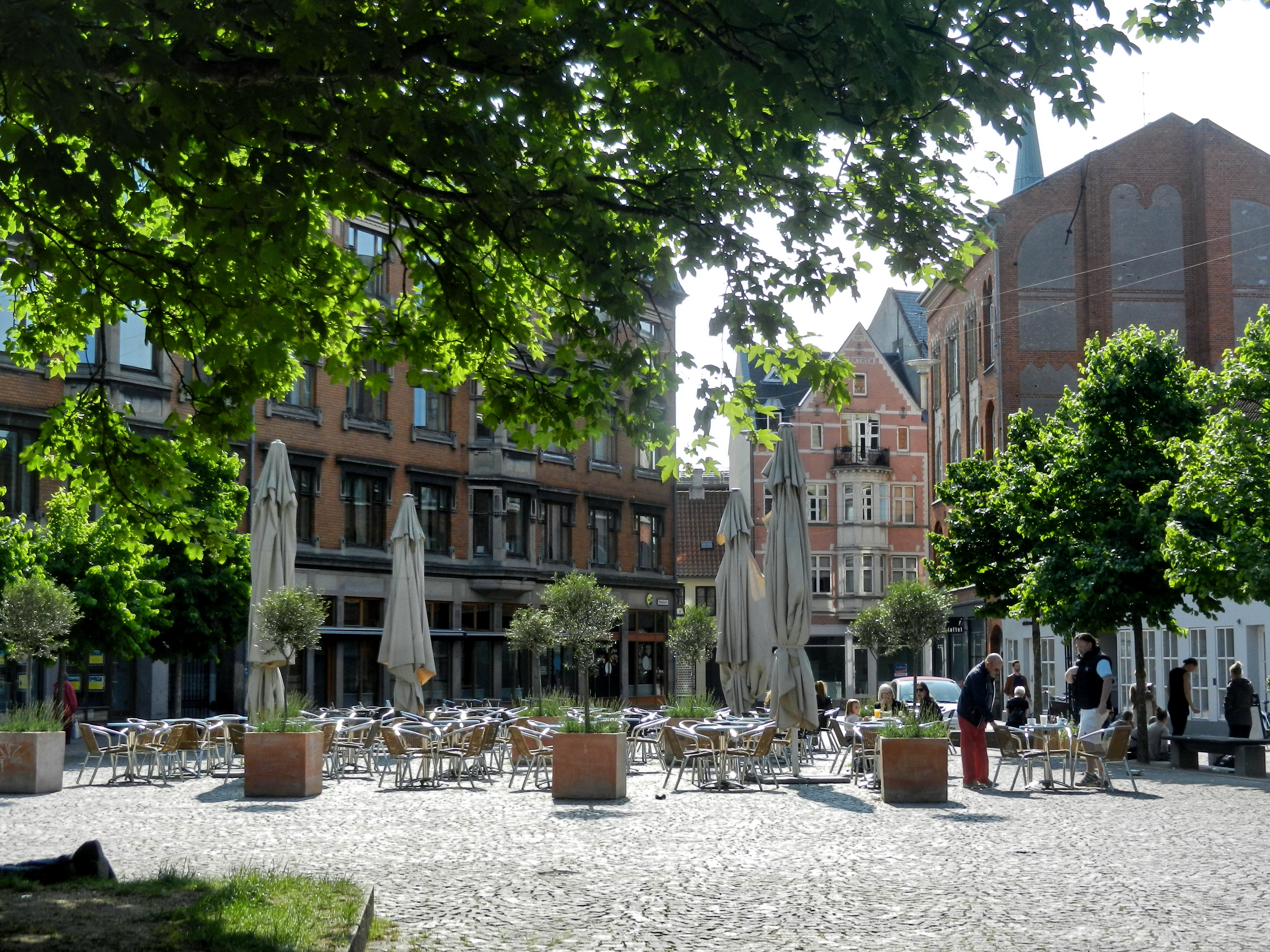
Cobbled squares

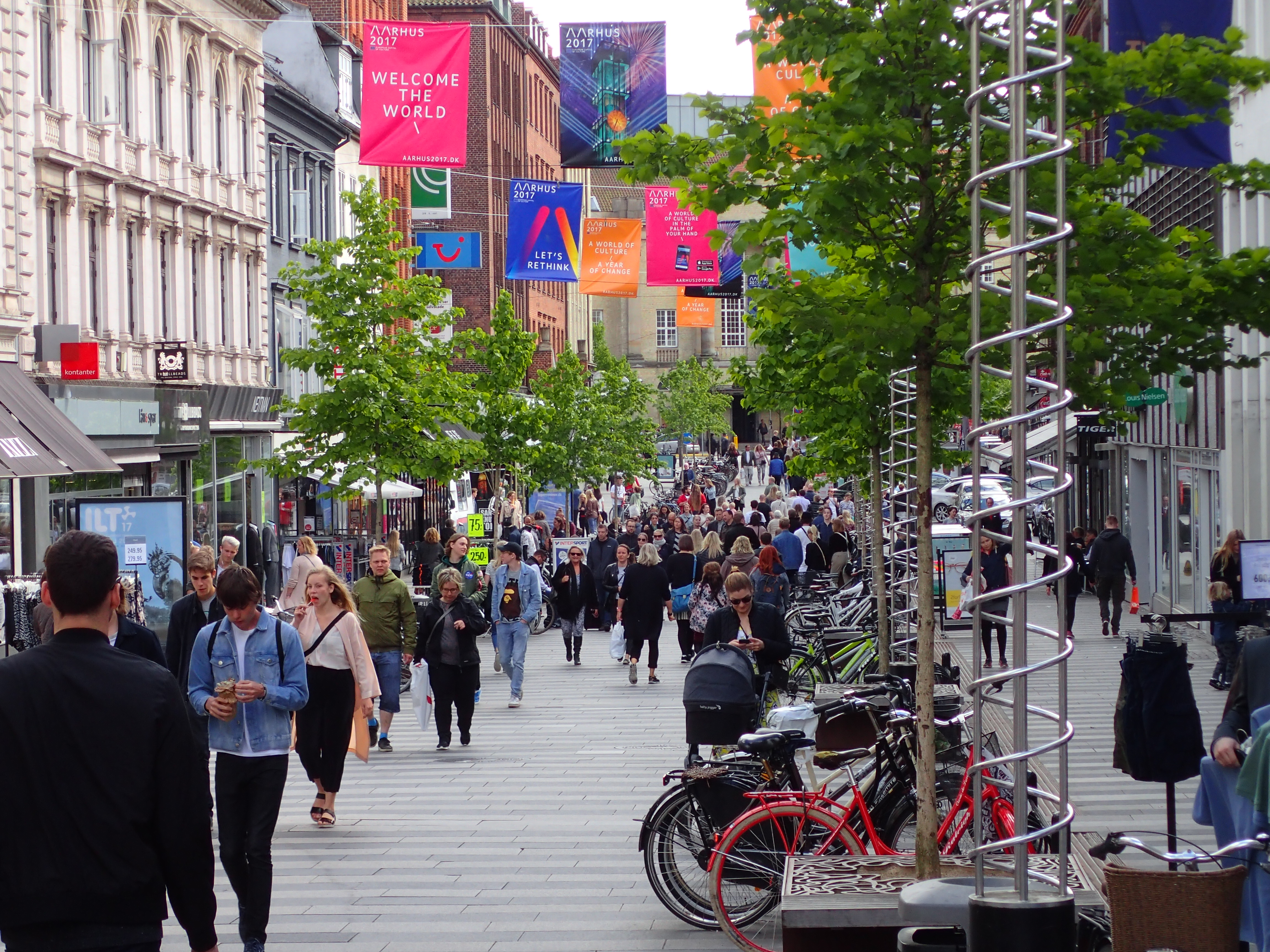
High streets and pedestrianized zones

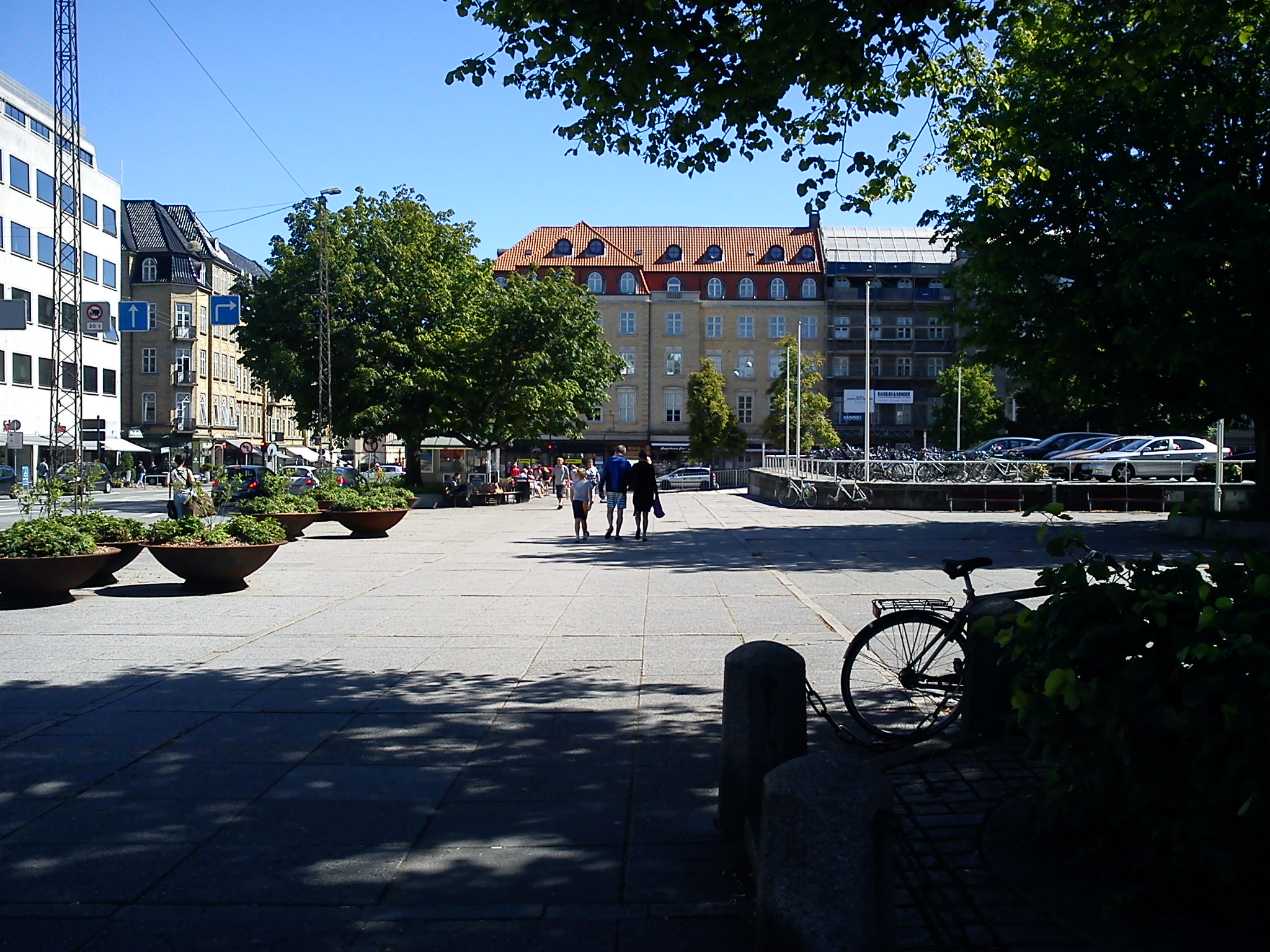
City Hall Square
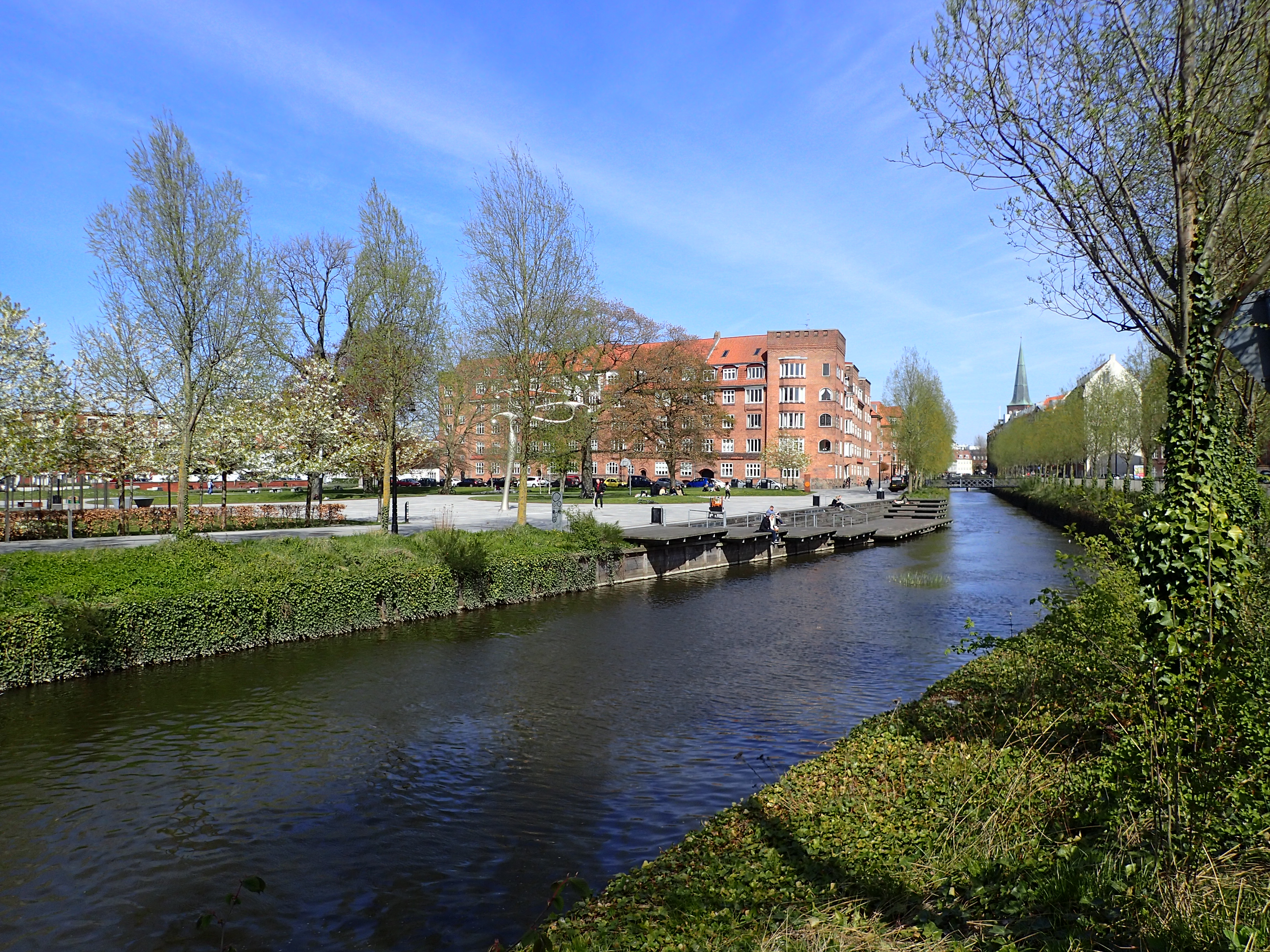
Aarhus River

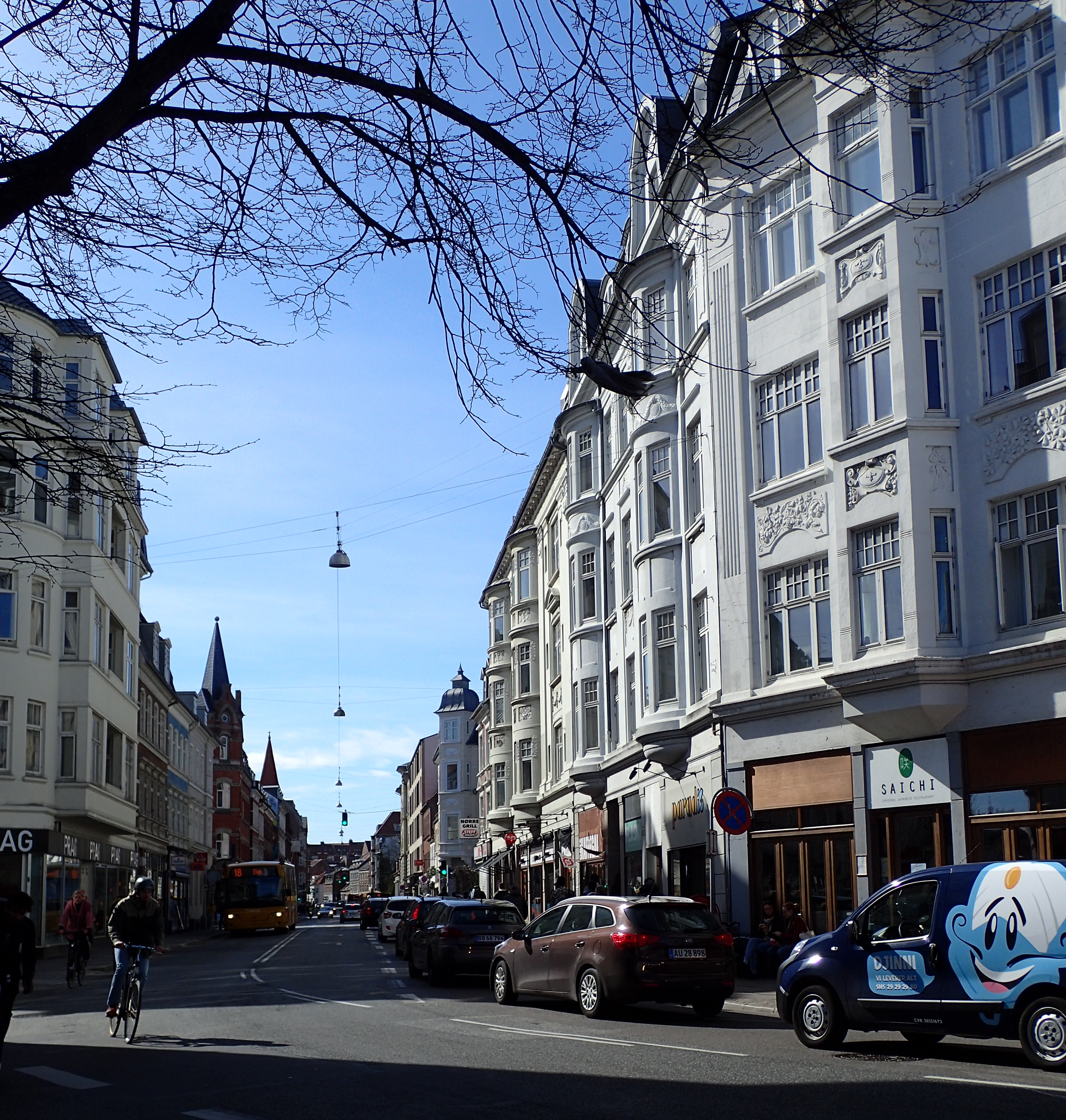
Nørregade and Nørre Allé

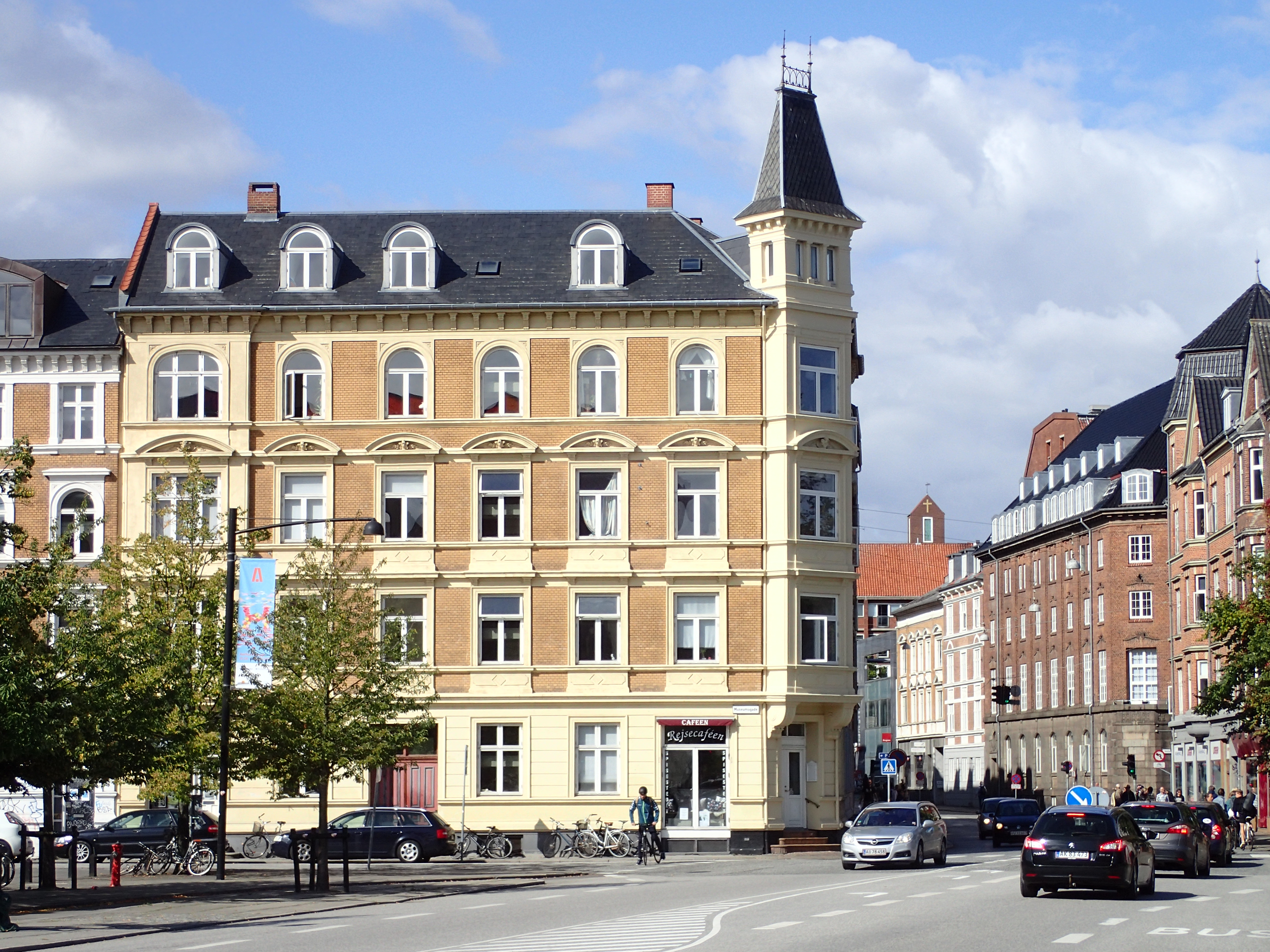
Vester Allé

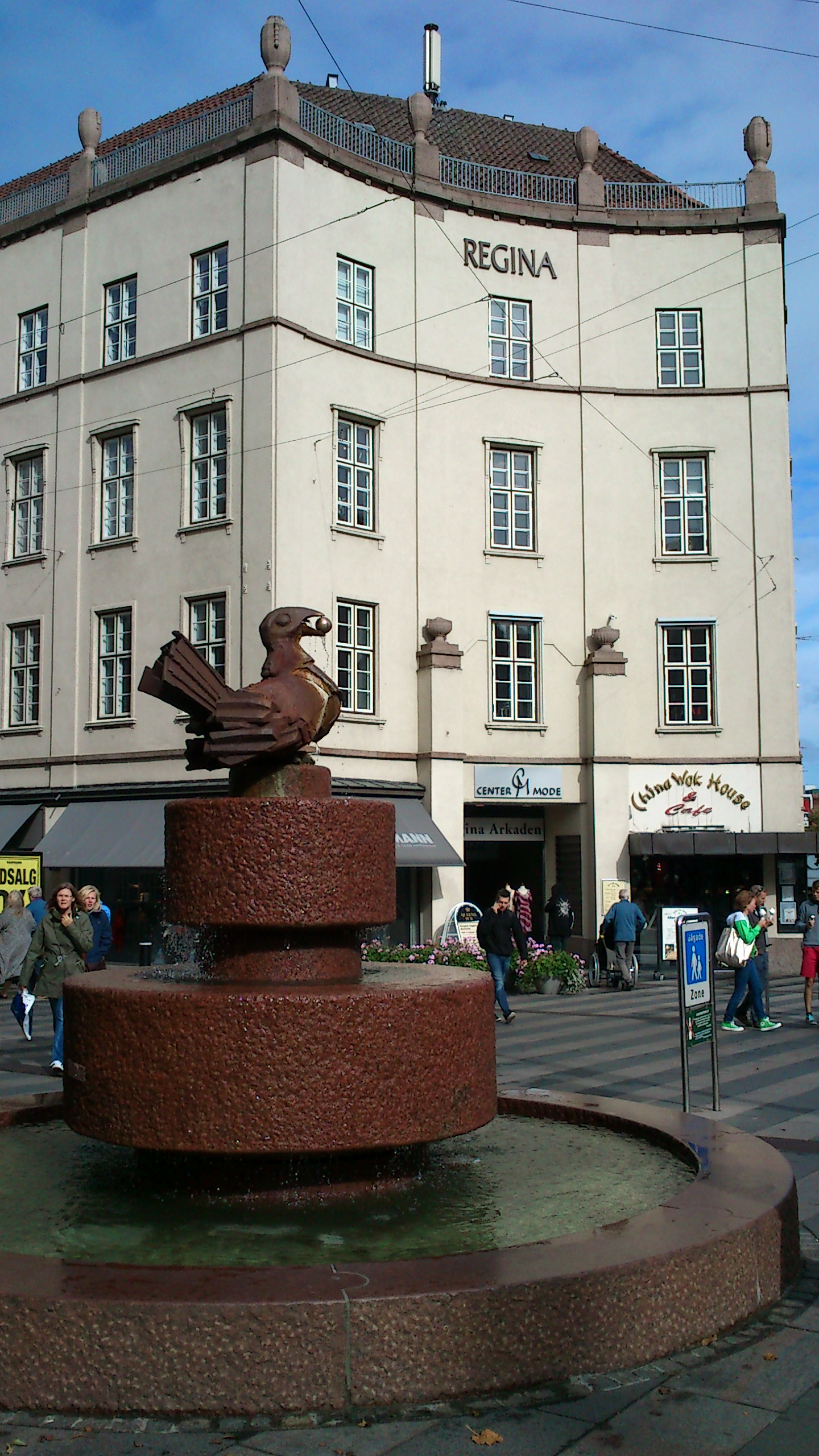
Sønder Allé
