= Hjalmar Kjær =

Danish architect (1872–1933)

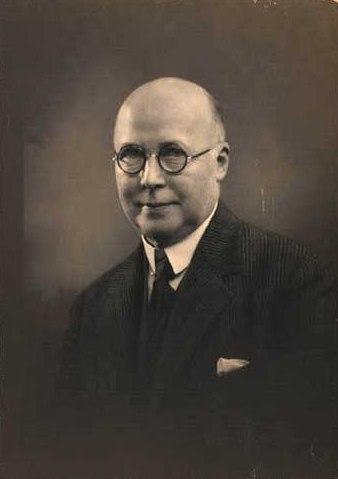
- Hjalmar Kjær
- Born: 12 September 1872; Aarhus, Denmark
- Died: 30 June 1933 (aged 60); Odense, Denmark
- Education: Royal Danish Academy of Fine Arts
- Occupation: Architect
- Buildings: The Five Sisters

Hjalmar Kjær was a Danish architect who worked extensively in Odense and made notable contributions to architecture in Denmark in the 19th and 20th centuries. HJalmar Kjær was the son of soap manufacturer Hans Kjær and Kathrine Rasmussen. He attended a technical college before he was admitted to the preparatory course of the Royal Danish Academy of Fine Arts in 1894 and graduated as an architect in May 1896.

Kjær established a design office in Odense in 1898 and lived there for most of his life. His works in Odense spans residential and public buildings, bridges, roads and streets. Outside Odense he designed buildings in the cities of Copenhagen and Aarhus and restored several manors on Fuenen and Lolland. Among them are two very different Catholic Apostolic Churches in Copenhagen and Aarhus respectively, the St. Nicholas' Church in Aarhus and the church on Krigersvej in Østerbro, Copenhagen.

In Aarhus he also built the Five Sisters silo complex which was the largest in the Nordic countries at the time and the first structure in the city made of reinforced concrete. The building is notable for the five front gabled silos inspired by canal houses in Amsterdam and other Dutch cities combined with a modern and high-tech engineering solution to industrial needs. The silos have smooth, white facades absent any decoration in the functionalist style prevalent at the time and is today an Industrial Heritage Site. During the National Exhibition of 1909 in Aarhus he also designed Skansepalæet.

Hjalmar Kjær was for a period the president of the Odense tourist organisation and a board member of the Craftsmen and Industry Organisation in Odense. He was married to Astrid Blichfeldt on 27 August 1899 in Aalborg. Kjær was buried in Odense.

== Selected works ==
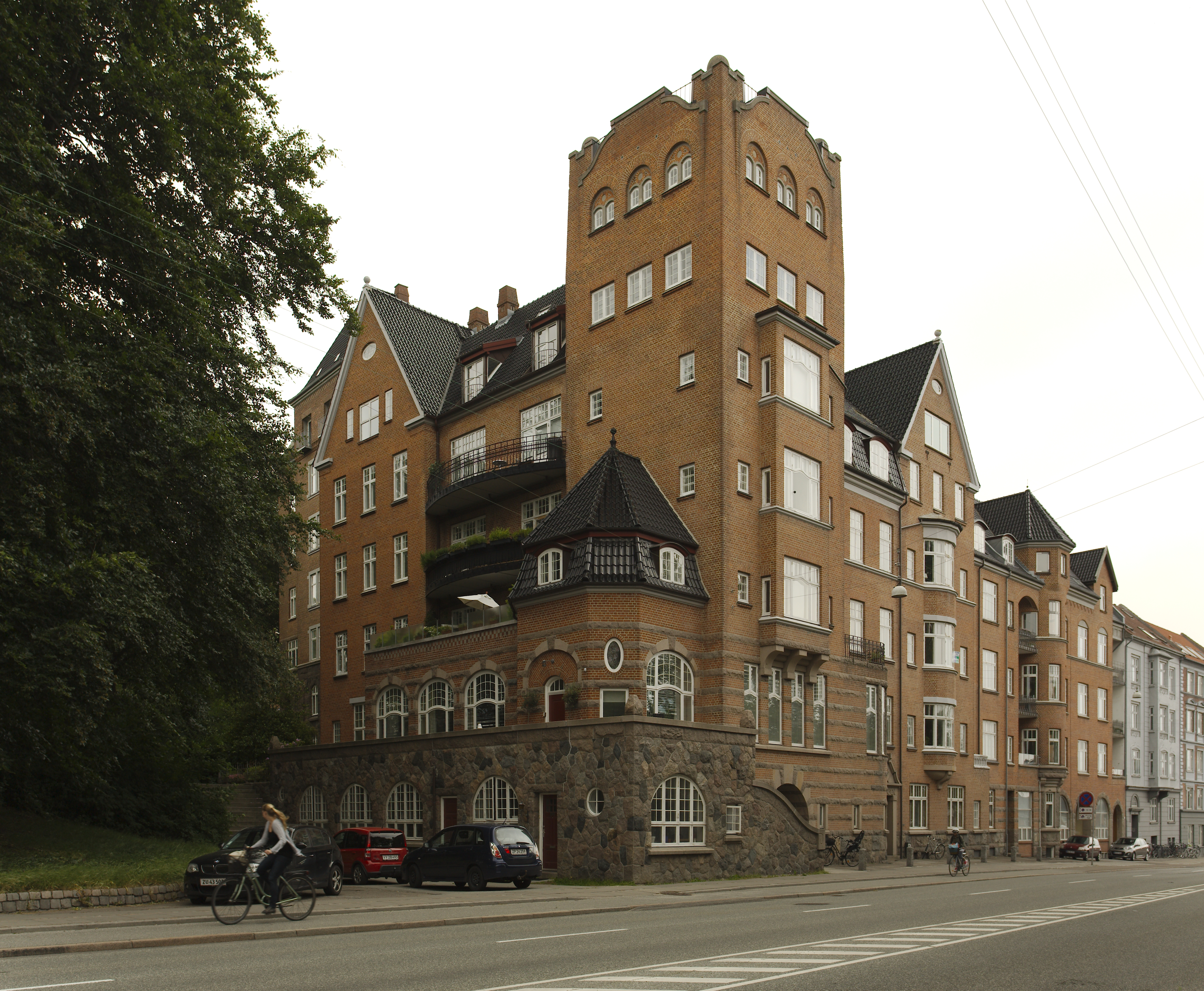
Skansepalæet with its characteristic tower.

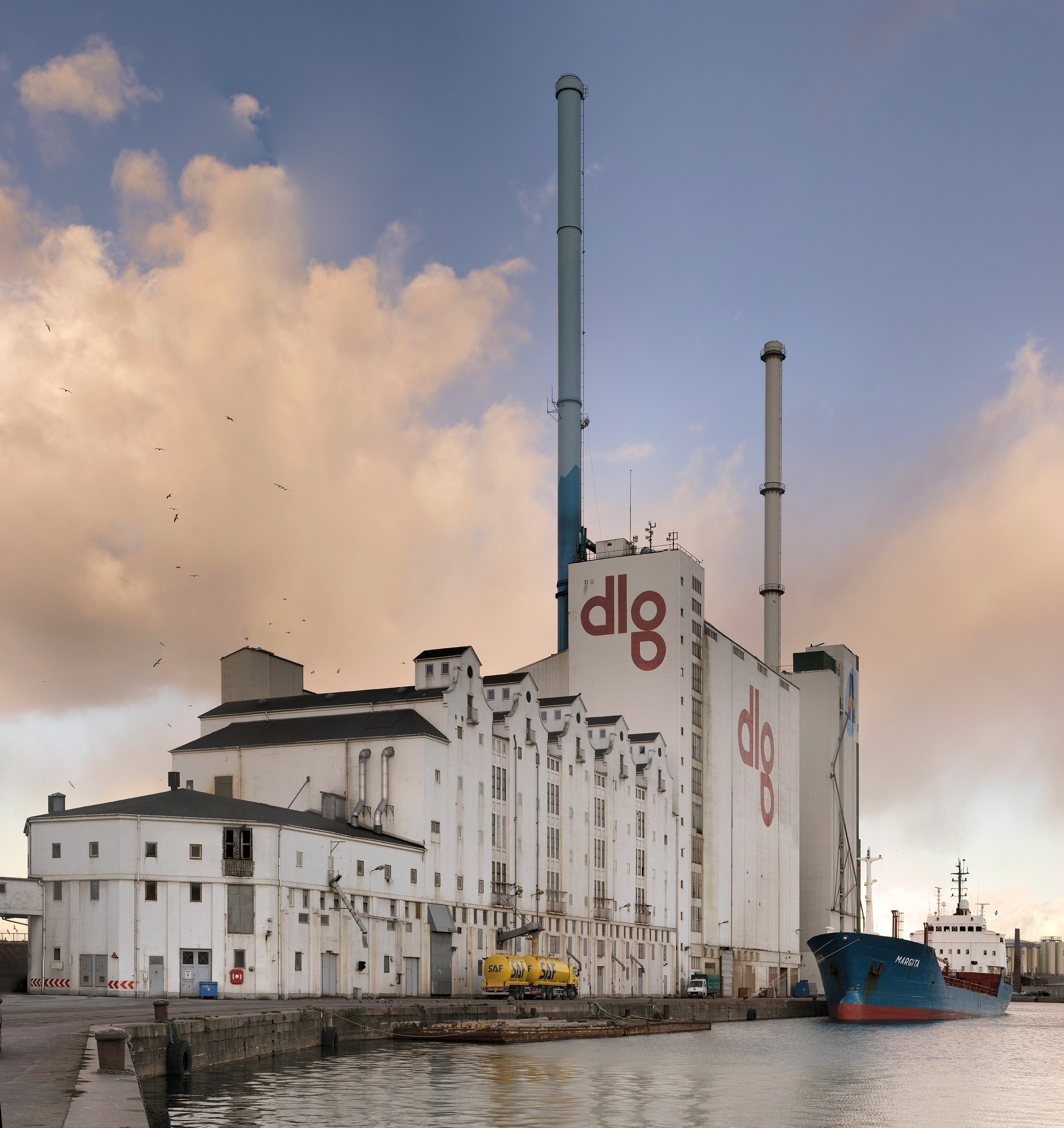
The Five Sisters, Aarhus Havn

=== Odense ===
- Kastanievejens Bridge, (1908)
- Ignaz and Anne Breums Stiftelse, (1909–10)
- Klarebro, (1911)
- Soldier's Home, (1912)
- Fire Station, Klostervej 28 (1916)
- Office Building, Pantheonsgade 5 (1918)
- Tietgens Bridge (1919–21, changed in 1956)
- Public Baths "Badstuen", Østre Stationsvej 26 (1922)
- Café Skovbakken, Fruens Bøge (1923)
- Paladsteatret, Vestergade 38 (1923)
- Giersings Realskole, Nonnebakken 7 (1924)
- Nursery, Vindegade 62 (1926, nedrevet)

=== Aarhus ===
- St. Nicholas' Church, (1893, defunct)
- Skansen og Skansepalæet, (1908–09)
- Silo complex The Five Sisters, (1926, Industrial Heritage Sites of Denmark)

=== Other ===
- Catholic-Apostolic Church, Copenhagen (1906)
- Renovation of Knuthenborg Manor on Lolland, Frederiksgave and Wedellsborg Manors on Fuenen (1909–14)
