= Cathrinesminde Brickworks =

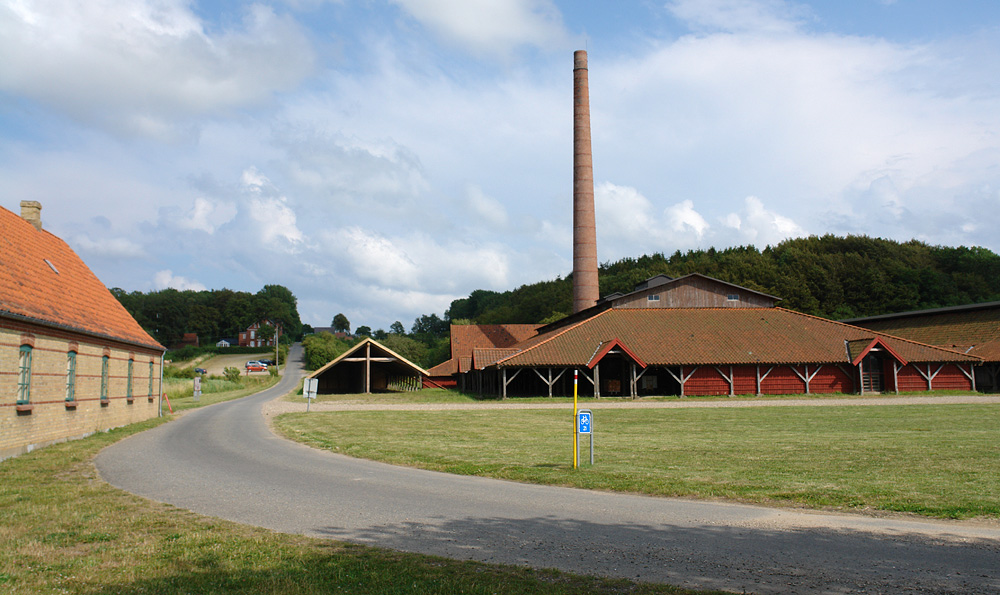
Cathrinesminde Brickworks

Cathrinesminde Brickworks (Danish: Cathrinesminde Teglværk) is a former brickworks on the Broager Peninsula on Flensburg Fjord, Sønderjylland, Denmark. It was designated as a National Industrial Heritage Site in 2007 and is now operated as a museum by Museum Sønderjylland.

== History ==
Cathrinesminde Brickworks was founded by a local farmer in 1732. Many of the first bricks were sent to Copenhagen where they were used in the rebuilding of the city following the Fire of 1728.

The farm was separated from the brickyard in 1880. In the 1880s, Andreas Hollensen introduced machinery, steam engines and constructed a Hoffmann kiln with 16 chambers. The Hoffmann kiln was able to burn one to two million bricks per year. The brickyard closed in 1968.

The disused brickyard was designated as one of 25 National Industrial Heritage Sites in 2007.

== See also ==
- Petersen Tegl
