= M. E. Grøn & Søn =

Former warehouse and retail establishment in Copenhagen, Denmark

Grøn's Warehouse
- Grøns Pakhus
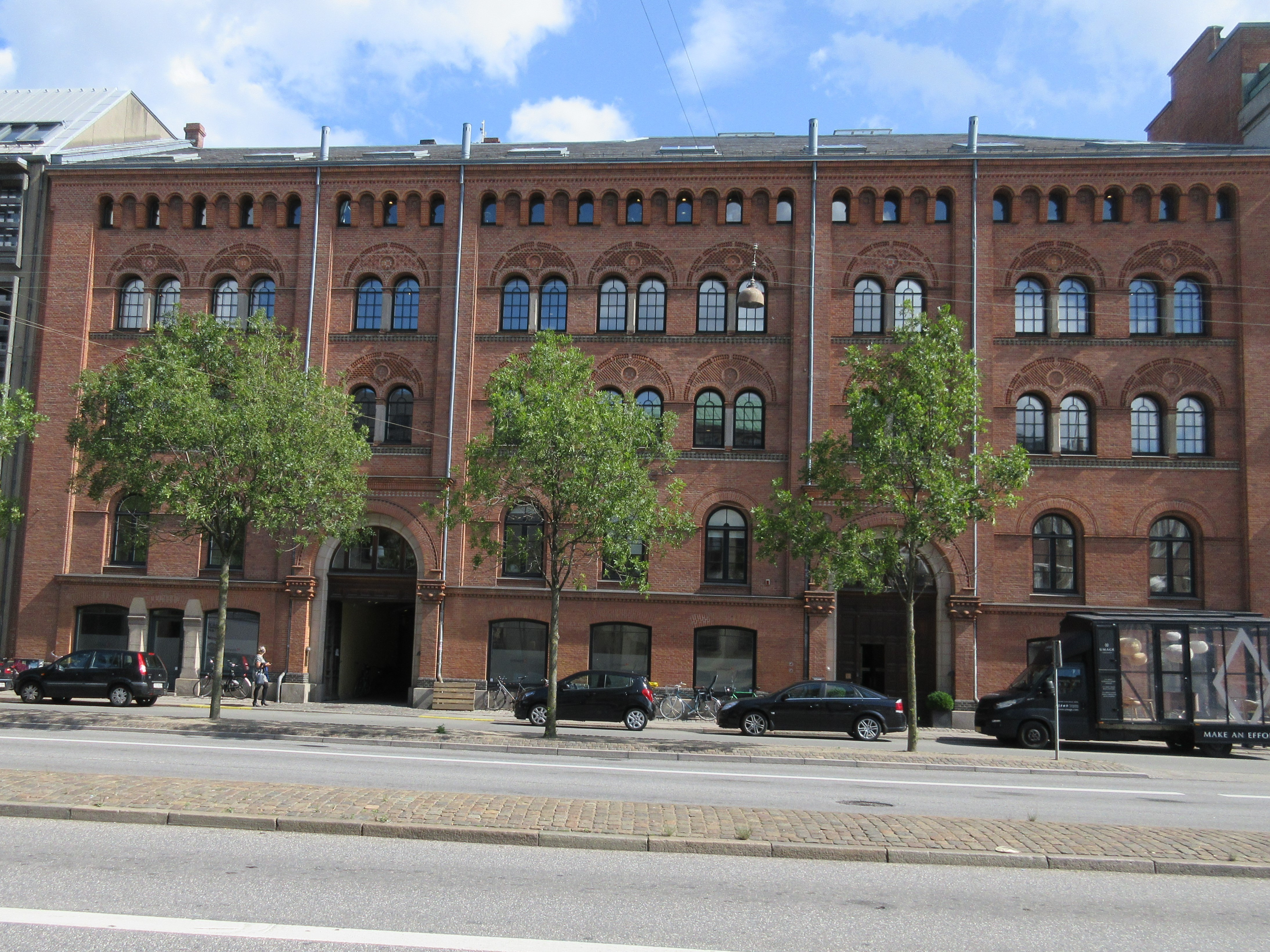
- Grøns Pakhus
- Interactive map of the Grøn's Warehouse area

General information
- Architectural style: Historicism
- Location: Copenhagen, Denmark
- Coordinates: 55°40′41.71″N 12°35′11″E
- Construction started: 1860
- Completed: 1863
- Client: Handelshuset M. C. Grøn
- Owner: Jeudan

Design and construction
- Architect: Johan Daniel Herholdt

Grøns Pakhus (lit. 'Grøn's Warehouse') is a former warehouse and retail establishment located on Holmens Kanal in the Gammelholm neighbourhood of central Copenhagen, Denmark. Opened by M.E. Grøn & Søn in 1863, it heralded the arrival of proper department stores in Denmark with the opening of Magasin du Nord a few years later. The Historicist building was designed by Johan Daniel Herholdt. The building was listed in 1979 and declared an Industrial Heritage Site in 2009.

== History ==
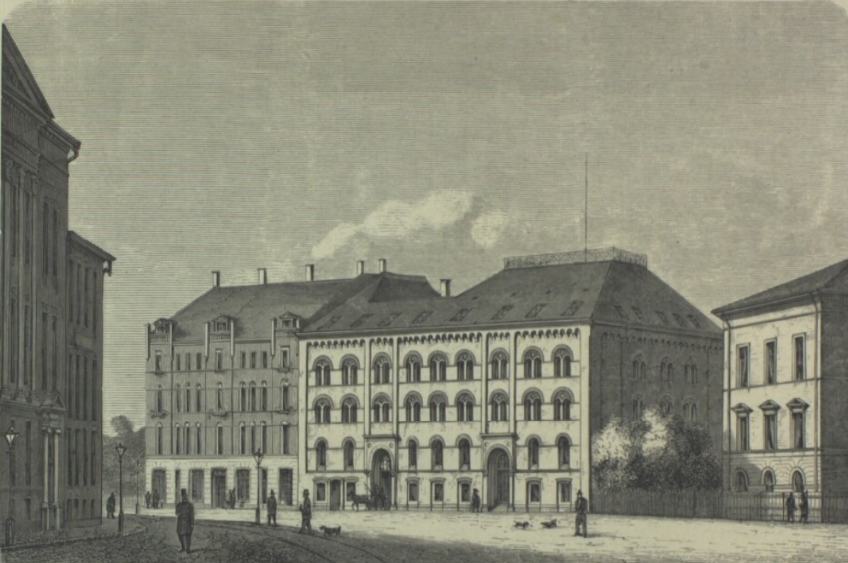
M. E. Grøn & Søn's building at Gammelholm in 1863

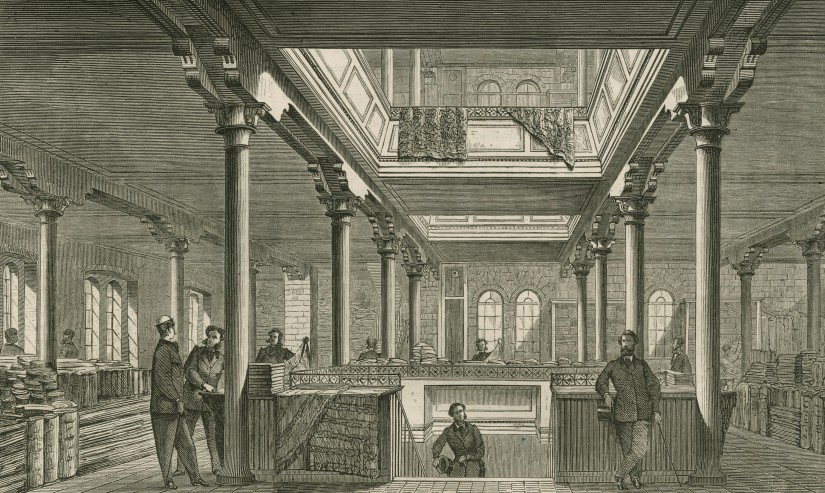
Interior of Grøns Pakhus

The company was founded by Marinus Emanuel Grøn on 27 April 1825. In 1850, it opened an office in Manchester and the inspiration for Grøns Pakhus came from England. It was one of the first civilian buildings in the new Gammelholm neighbourhood which was under development in the grounds of the former naval shipyard Bremerholm. The building was technically advanced for its time, featuring hydraulic lifts, central heating, running water and an internal system integrated in the supporting iron pillars.

In 1990, Dansk Ingeniørforenings Pensionskasse commissioned Niels Brøns to undertake a refurbishment of the building which received an award from Copenhagen Municipality in 2001. Jeudan purchased the building in 2010.

== Architecture ==
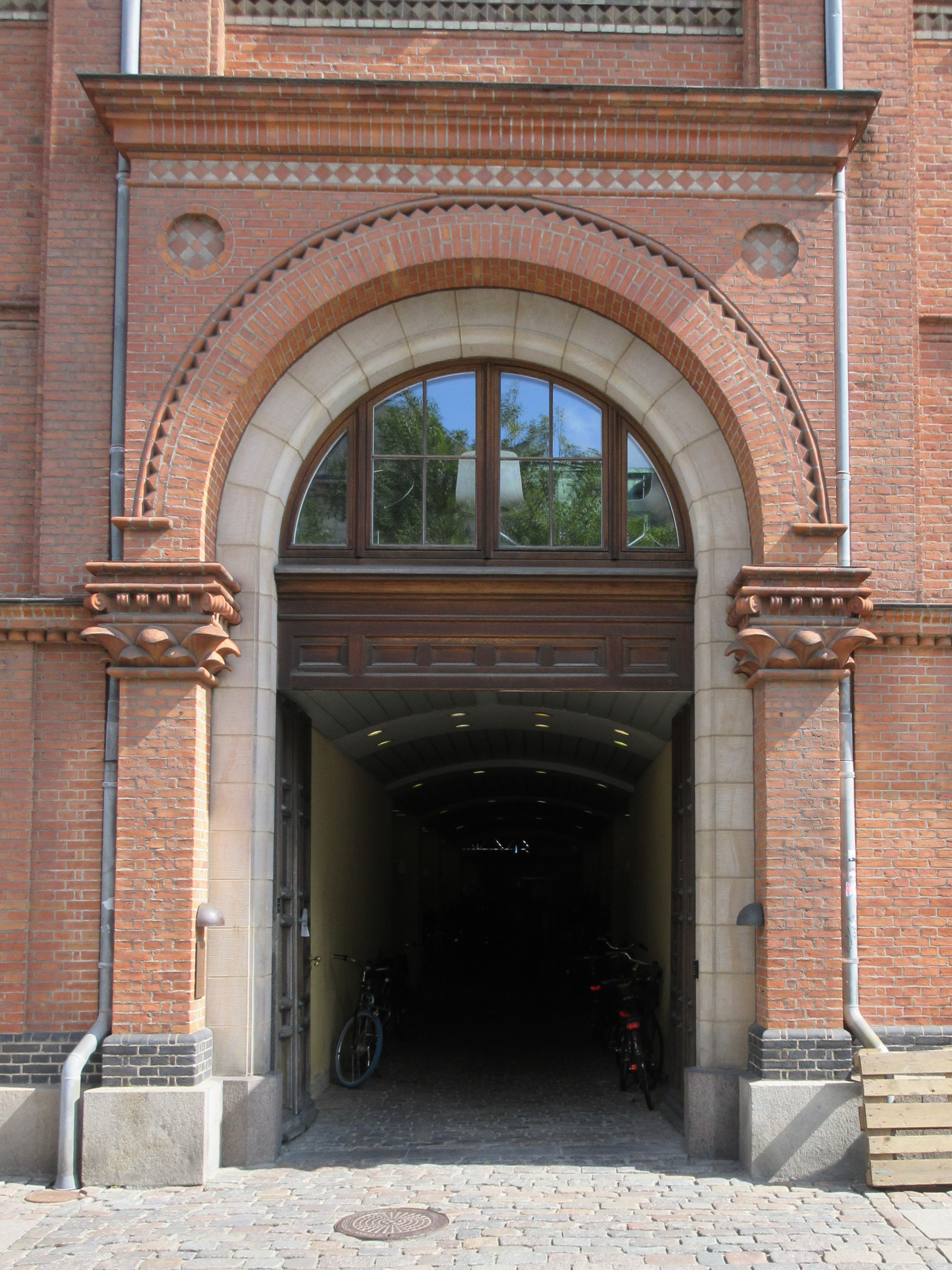
One of the two gates

Grøns Pakhus is built in red brick. The building is nine bays wide and has two gates at the third and sixth bays, The windows are round-arched and the windows on the second and third storey are double.

== Today ==
A number of buildings now have their headquarters in the building. It also contains the cocktail bar Holmens Kanal 7 (or HK 7).

== See also ==
- Ludvig Jens Tønnes Grøn
