= Danish Poster Museum =

Museum in Aarhus

Coordinates: 56°09′29.4″N 10°11′37.2″E

- Dansk Plakat Museum
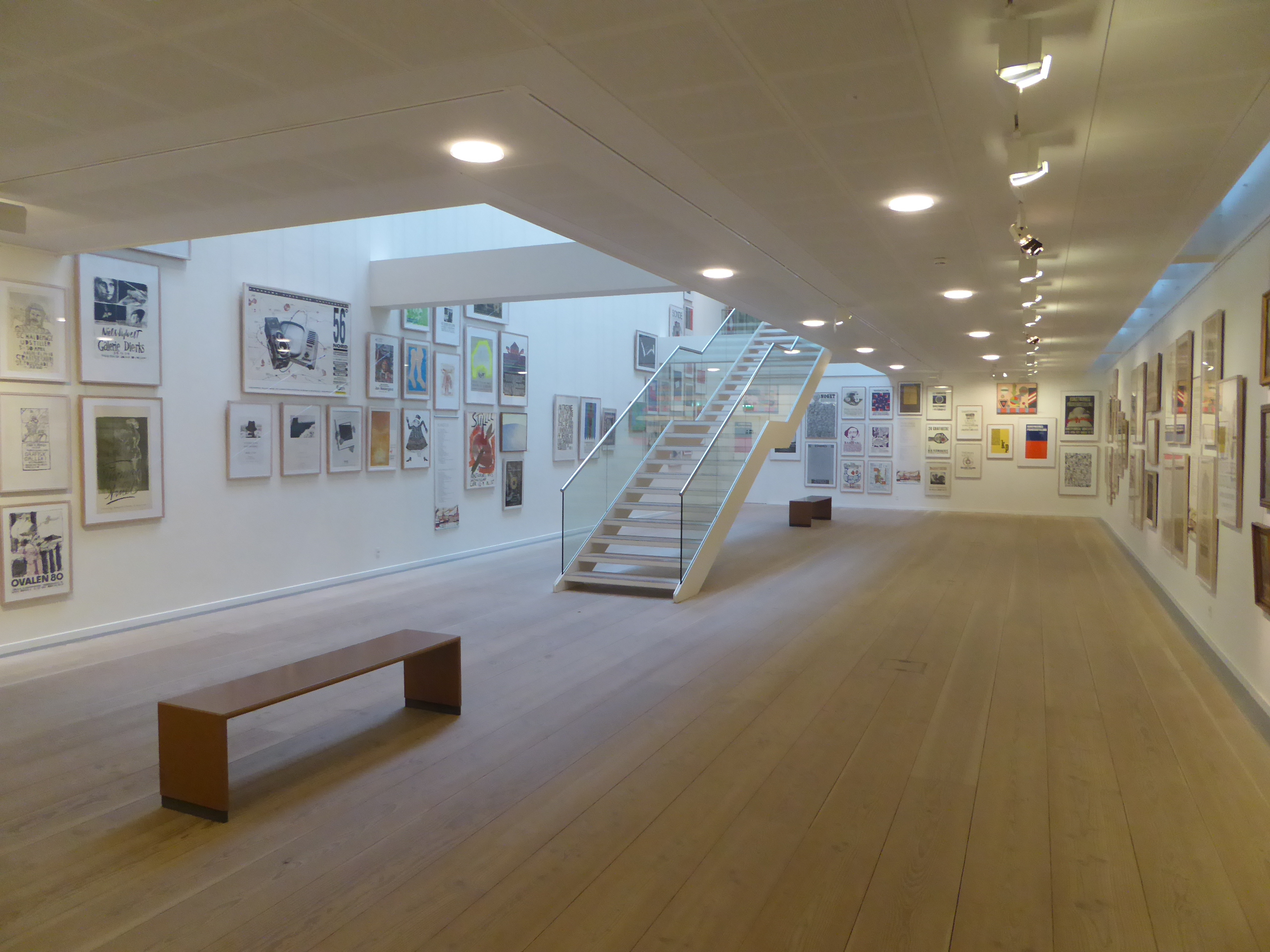
- Danish Poster Museum
- Established: 1993
- Location: Vesterbrogade 38A; Aarhus C Denmark
- Type: Historic wall art
- Website: Danish Poster Museum

The Danish Poster Museum Danish: Det Danske Plakatmuseum in Aarhus, Denmark is a museum dedicated to the history of poster art. The museum is situated in the open air museum The Old Town in the Town Center neighbourhood in central Aarhus.

The museum originates from a collection by the Danish painter Peder Stougaard, who began collecting posters in 1972. Initially the collection was primarily Danish but it has been expanded with poster art from across the world through outreach to embassies and museums.

The Poster Museum was founded in 1993 and Stougaards' collection was donated to the museum, where it remains central to the exhibit and overall collection. In 2006 the museum moved into buildings in the Old Town museum. The entrance to the museum is a pavilion from the Danish National Exhibition of 1909 but the interior is a modern complex in two stories, designed by the architects firm C. F. Møller. In September 2012 Elsebeth Aasted Schanz was appointed to the position of museum director.

The collection spans some 400,000 posters with a wide foundation, covering all types of posters from commercial advertising to wall art, both national and international. The exhibition hall shows a collection of classical Danish posters from the 19th and 20th centuries with 6-8 annual exhibits focused on specific topics such as the Second World War, the Cold War and the hippie movement.
