= Skansepalæet =

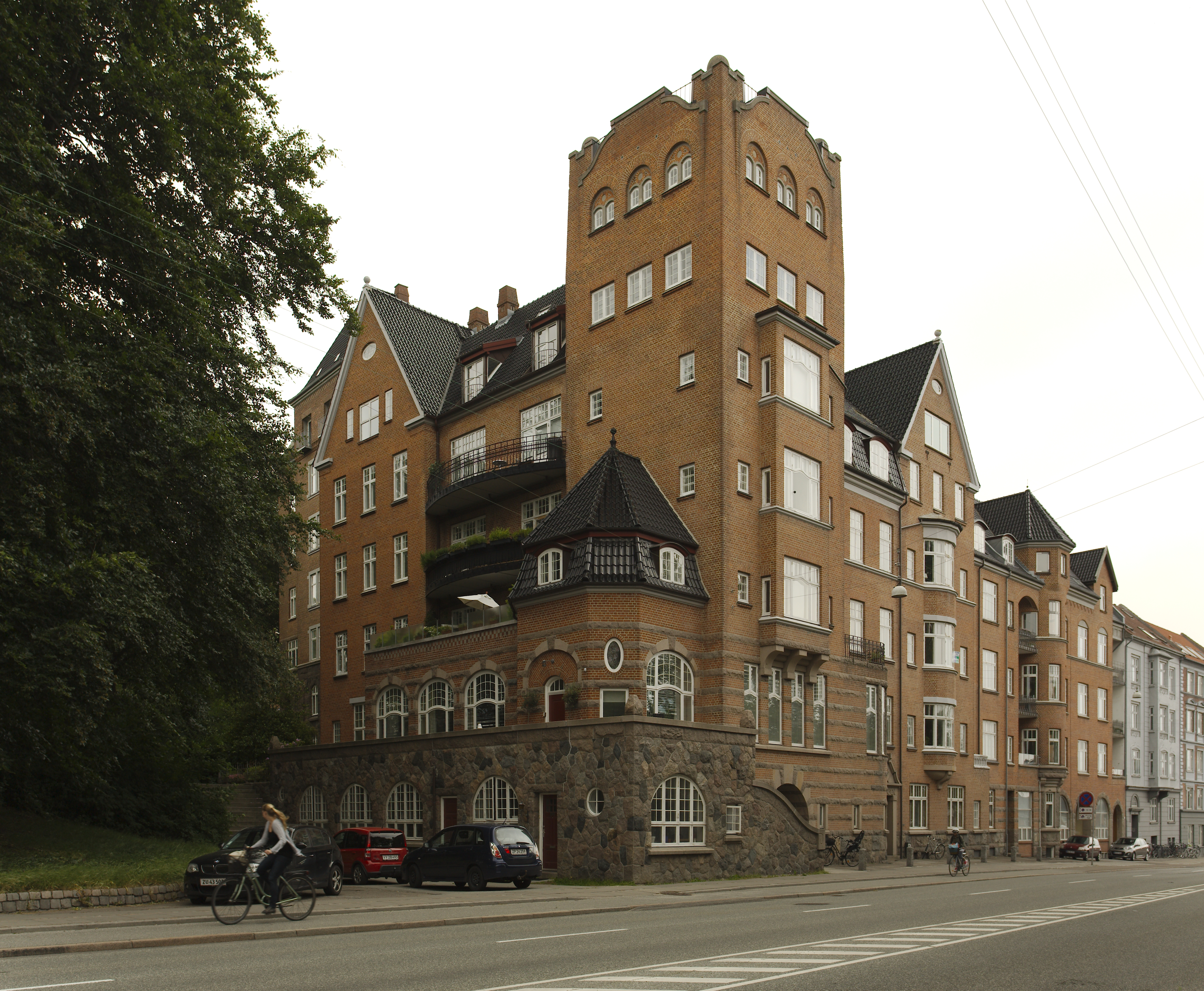
- Front facade of Skansepalæet
- Interactive map of the Skansepalæet area

General information
- Type: Residential
- Architectural style: National Romantic
- Location: Aarhus, Denmark, Strandvejen 36, 8000 Aarhus C
- Coordinates: 56.1458°N 10.2085°E
- Named for: Wallenstein's sconce
- Completed: 1908

Design and construction
- Architect: Hjalmar Kjær

Skansepalæet (Lit.: Sconce Palace) is a residential building in Aarhus, Denmark situated in the Frederiksbjerg neighborhood. The building comprises Standvejen 34-36 and Heibergsgade 25-27. Skansepalæet was built in 1908 by designs of the Danish architect Hjalmar Kjær as a hotel in connection with the Danish National Exhibition of 1909. Today the building is an apartment complex owned by its residents.

== History ==
The building is named for the sconce erected by Albrecht von Wallenstein on the site in 1627 when he occupied Aarhus during the Thirty Years' War. The fortification was used as a base for raids throughout Jutland until the war ended and it was abandoned. The area was at the time a part of the Marselisborg Manor. In the late 1800s the neighborhood Frederiksbjerg was almost fully developed and the city council started negotiations with the owner of Marselisborg Manor and Minister of the Interior, Hans Peter Ingerslev, to buy the manor. On 18 April 1896 Ingerslev signed the agreement to sell most of his estate to the city and then subsequently died two days later. The Municipality honored the agreement and bought the manor including the Marselisborg Forests.

The Skanseparken (Sconce Park) was established in the area in 1901-02. In 1909 Aarhus hosted the Danish National Exhibition of 1909 and Skansepalæet was built as a hotel for tourists and visitors where the former sconce had been. After the exhibition the building was turned into an apartment complex.

== Architecture ==
The building was commissioned by Rasmus Hviid who built a number of structures in Aarhus at the time. The Danish architect Hjalmar Kjær designed it along the urban development plans designed for the Marselisborg area by Hack Kampmann and Charles Ambt. The overall plan for the area contains many boulevards, squares, and green spaces which still characterize the area today. The intention was to attract wealthier people to the area and the building was designed with apartments larger than was common and with modern amenities such as central heating.

The building is in National Romantic style inspired by Baroque revival and Art Nouveau. The building is constructed of red brick on a base of rough cut granite. The windows are also framed by horizontal bands of granite. The building appear relatively complex with a large 7-story castle-like tower, shifted floors and different dormer windows, balconies and bay windows.

In 2011-12 a small communal building was added along with a tool shed and a playground, designed by Peter Skjalm from the studio RUM3.
