= St. Nicholas Church, Aarhus =

Saint Nikolaj Church
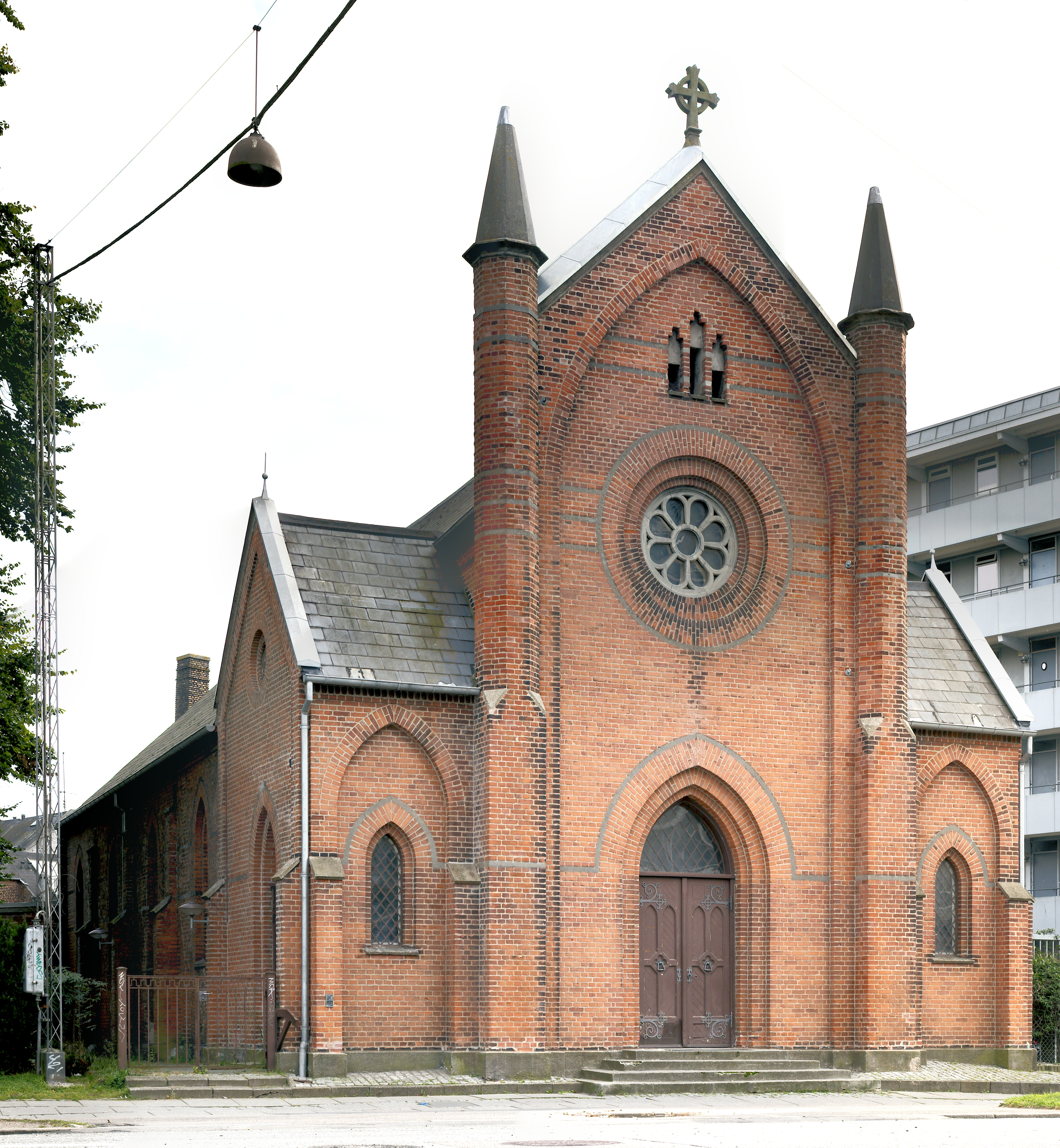
- Saint Nikolaj Church
- 56.1509°N 10.2002°E
- Location: Frederiks Allé 37; 8000 Aarhus
- Country: Denmark
- Denomination: Catholic Church

History
- Status: Church

Architecture
- Architect(s): Hjalmar Kjær; Emanuel Edvard Christie Fleischer
- Completed: 1893

Specifications
- Materials: Brick

Saint Nikolaj Church (Danish: Sankt Nikolaj Kirke) is a church in Aarhus, Denmark. The church is situated in the Indre by neighbourhood on the western edge of the City Hall Park and was completed in 1893, based on a design by Emanuel Edvard Christie Fleischer and Hjalmar Kjær in the Neo-Romanesque style. Saint Nikolaj Church is today owned and operated by the Catholic Church in Denmark and serves the local Chaldean Catholic congregation in Aarhus. The church is 700 square meters and holds 28 benches which can seat up to 300 people.

== History ==
The church originally belonged to a congregation under the Catholic Apostolic Church, founded in Scotland in 1832. The Apostolic Church came to Denmark with Sir Georg Hewett in 1861; in 1879 the congregation in Aarhus was established, and in 1893 the church was completed by plans by Emanuel Edvard Christie Fleischer and Hjalmar Kjær. The first service was held on 23 April 1893.

The congregation peaked in the 1940s with some 600 members, also operating a second church in Thunøgade street. The Apostolic belief system meant that priests could only be appointed by one of 12 apostles. The last apostle died in 1901 and no new priests were appointed, so in 1953 the last priest left St. Nikolaj Church. The congregation did not disappear, but activities in the church were thereafter led by regular laity. Over time the membership of the congregation diminished and in the late 2000s the church was used no more than half an hour per week. In December 2010 the church was given to the Catholic Church, which renamed it to St. Nikolaj Church and today use it for the Chaldean Catholic congregation in Aarhus.

The church was named St. Nikolaj for a number of historical reasons. The other Catholic church in Aarhus, Church of Our Lady, was originally named St. Nikolaj Church, the street running perpendicular to the church is Skt. Nicolaus Gade, and Saint Nicholas as a saint connects the eastern and western churches and is the patron saint of port cities.

== Chaldean Catholic Church ==
The Chaldean Catholic congregation in Denmark is composed of some 2000 Catholics primarily from Iraq, and the congregation in Aarhus is the largest in Denmark. Prior to 1991 most Chaldo-Assyrians lived in northern Iraq, but Saddam Hussein forcefully relocated most of them in an attempt to turn make areas majority Muslim. Today, degradation in security since the early 2000s have forced many to flee, which has caused the congregation in Denmark and Aarhus to grow. In 2010 some 400 Assyrian families resided in Denmark.

== See also ==
- List of churches in Aarhus
