= Five Sisters (Aarhus) =

Coordinates: 56.1535°N 10.2141°E

The Five Sisters
- DLG Silo complex
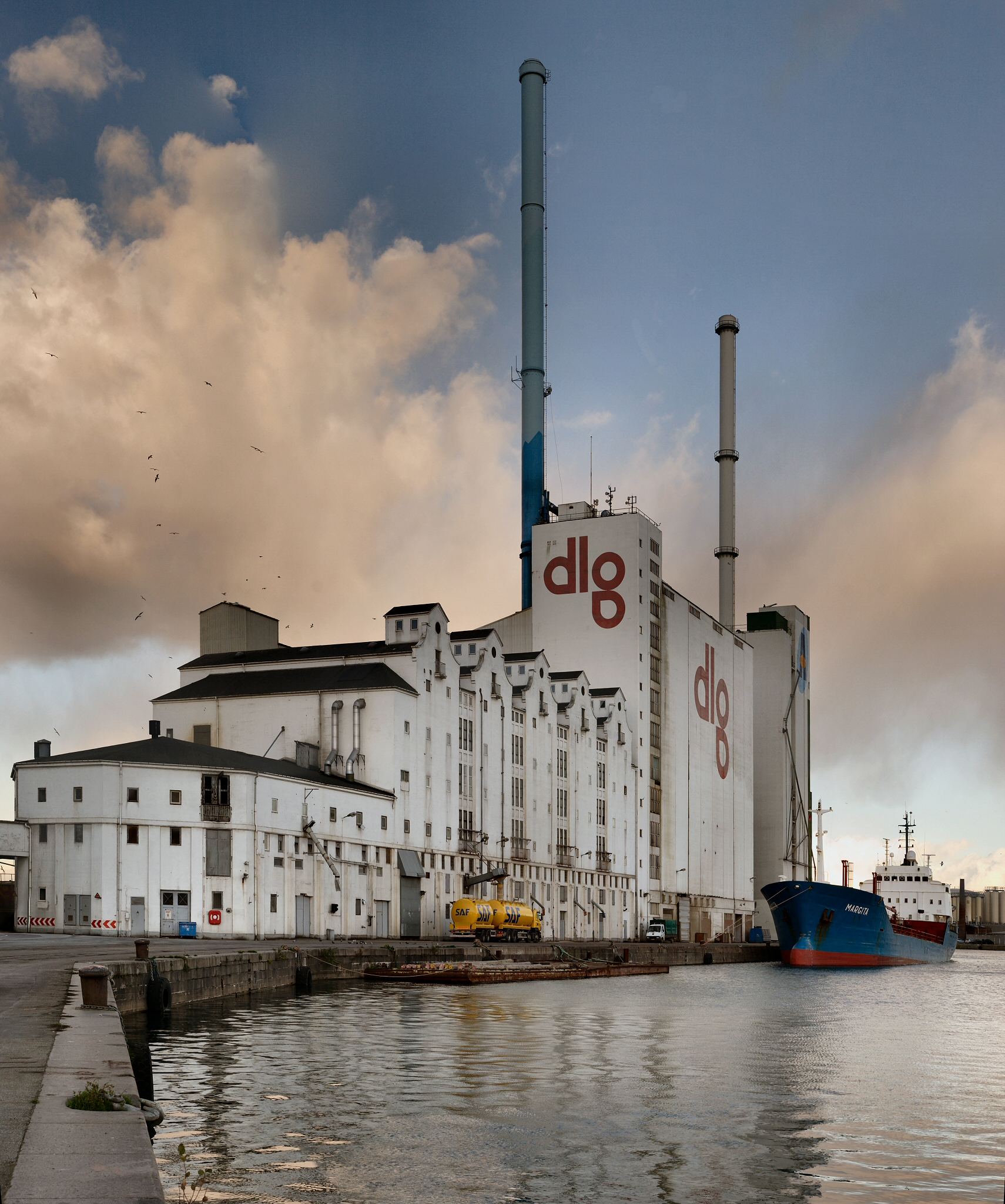
- Interactive map of the The Five Sisters area

General information
- Location: Aarhus, Denmark
- Completed: 1927

Design and construction
- Architect: Hjalmar Kjær

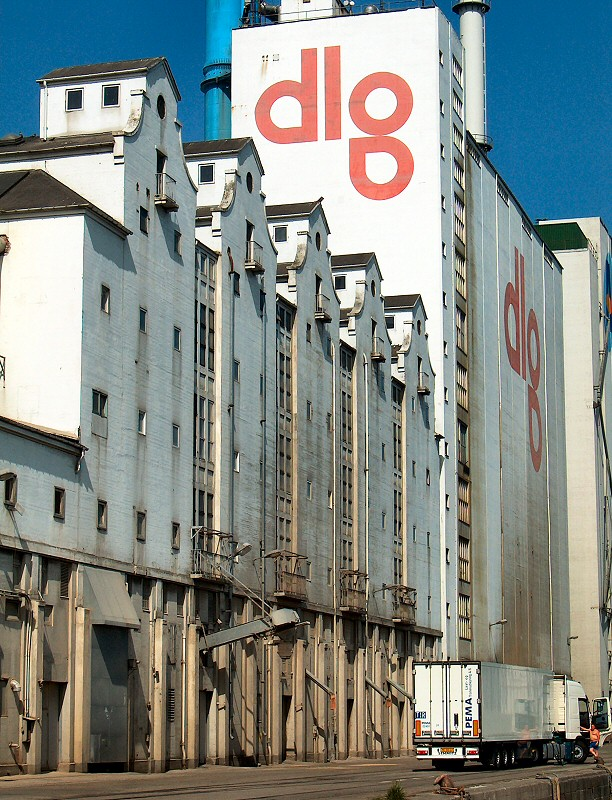
Five Sisters and DLG

The Five Sisters (Danish: De fem søstre) is a building and silo complex in Aarhus, Denmark which is an Industrial Heritage Site of Denmark. It is situated on the Mellemarmen pier on the industrial section of the Port of Aarhus in Aarhus city center. The silos represent the transition from manual to mechanized labor during the second wave of industrialization in the early 20th century and are symptomatic of the relationship between agriculture, industry and transport in the city. The Five Sisters were the first reinforced concrete structure to be erected in Aarhus and at the time it was the only building apart from the cathedral to rise above the city.

== History ==
In the 1800s grain was typically stored in bulk or in sacks in storehouses or merchant's attics in a process that was both labor intensive and physically demanding. The risk of the products rotting or catching fire combined with the rising amount of cargo arriving made it necessary to find a more modern solution. In the 1890s silos were increasingly used. The earliest were placed inside existing buildings but later on dedicated structures of reinforced concrete became the norm.

In 1898 the farmer's cooperative Jysk Andelsfoderstofforretning (JAF) was established and headquartered in Aarhus for the purpose of managing and selling agricultural products. The company became one of the largest in the country, opening trade hubs throughout the realm. In 1927 the silo complex was erected in the south harbor with designs by the architect Hjalmar Kjær. The new structure heralded a change in labor processes with physically demanding work being replaced by electrical engines and elevators. Initially the silos had capacity for 12000 cubic meter oilseed and 13800 cubic meter grain while the lifting systems could handle 120 metric tonnes per hour. Building the silos into one structure made it possible to aerate the grain by moving it from one silo to another with electrical cup elevators and later vacuums. The elevators were also used to load and unload cargo ships and at the same time unloading coal became mechanized with cranes. The system was the beginning of a greatly reduced labor force in the port.

The productivity benefits quickly became apparent; ships increased in size proportionally to the amount of cargo that could be handled. The Five Sisters was the first but other complexes followed shortly; Aarhus Oliefabrik built a 20.000 cubic meter silo and in 1930 Korn- og Foderstof Kompagniet completed another large silo complex. In 1969 JAF merged with a number of other companies to form Dansk Landbrugs Grovvareselskab (DLG) which still owned the silo complex in the 2010s.

The Five Sisters was initially not received well due to their size and industrial appearance. The cathedral had since the 1500s been the dominant feature of the skyline and the equally tall silos were by many considered an eyesore in comparison. However, some architects have also noted them as an inspiration for later industrial and functionalist architecture.

== Architecture ==
The Five Sisters was designed by architect Hjalmar Kjær and engineer Jørgen Christensen. It was the largest silo complex in the Nordic countries when it was completed and it was a technologically advanced replacement for the former storehouses. The complex includes 5 silos and a storehouse in 2 stories constructed of white painted re-enforced concrete with smooth, homogeneous facades absent any decoration. The area chosen was swampy in a newly developed part of the harbor making it necessary to use a piled foundation with 1200 14 meter long poles. The warehouse sits on a floating raft foundation.

The Five Sisters marks the beginning of industrial Functionalist architecture in Denmark but can be best described as Neoclassical in style due to its historicist references. The name of the complex references the division of the silos into 5 parts inspired by the front gabled canal houses seen in Amsterdam and other Dutch cities.

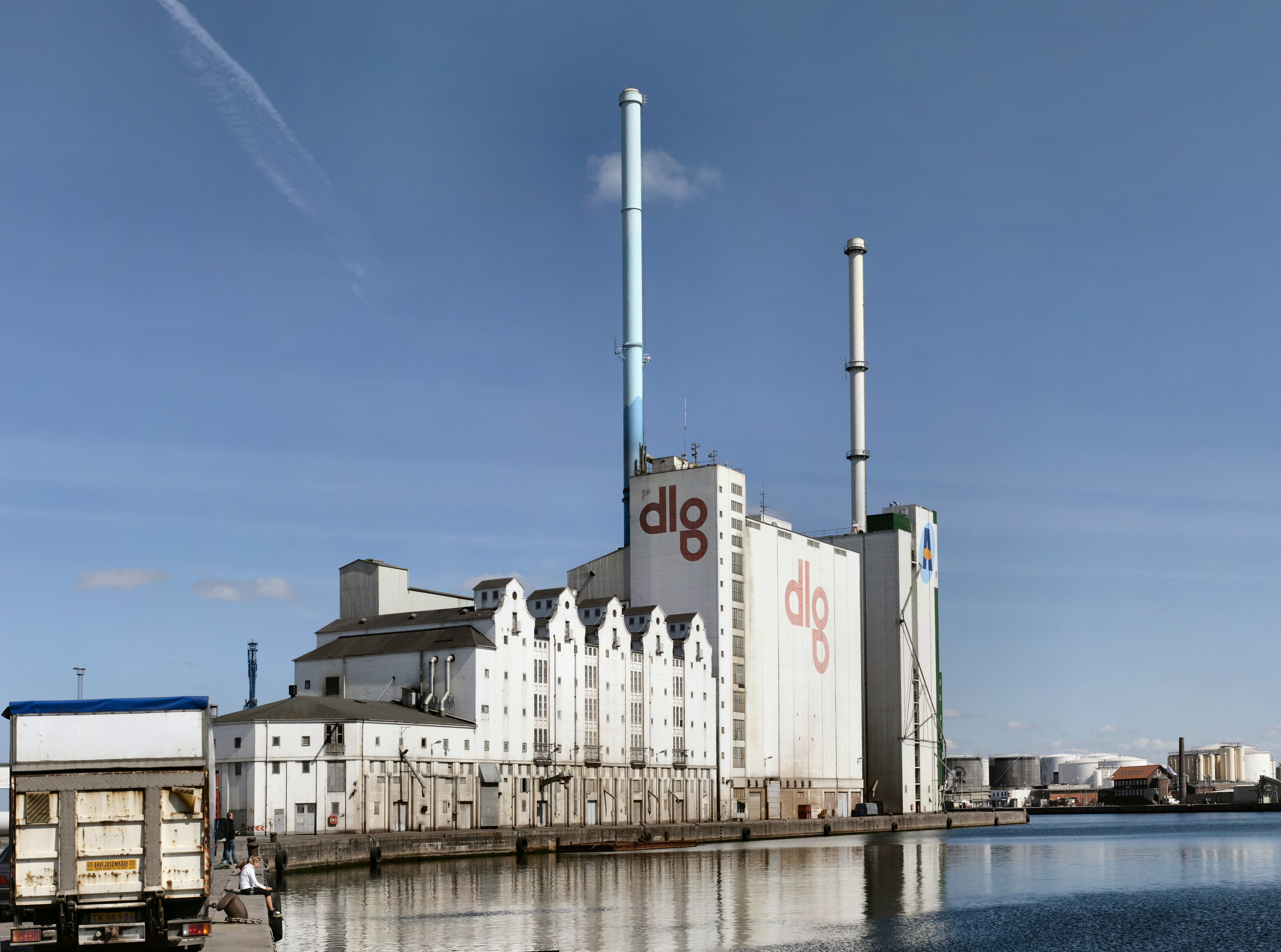

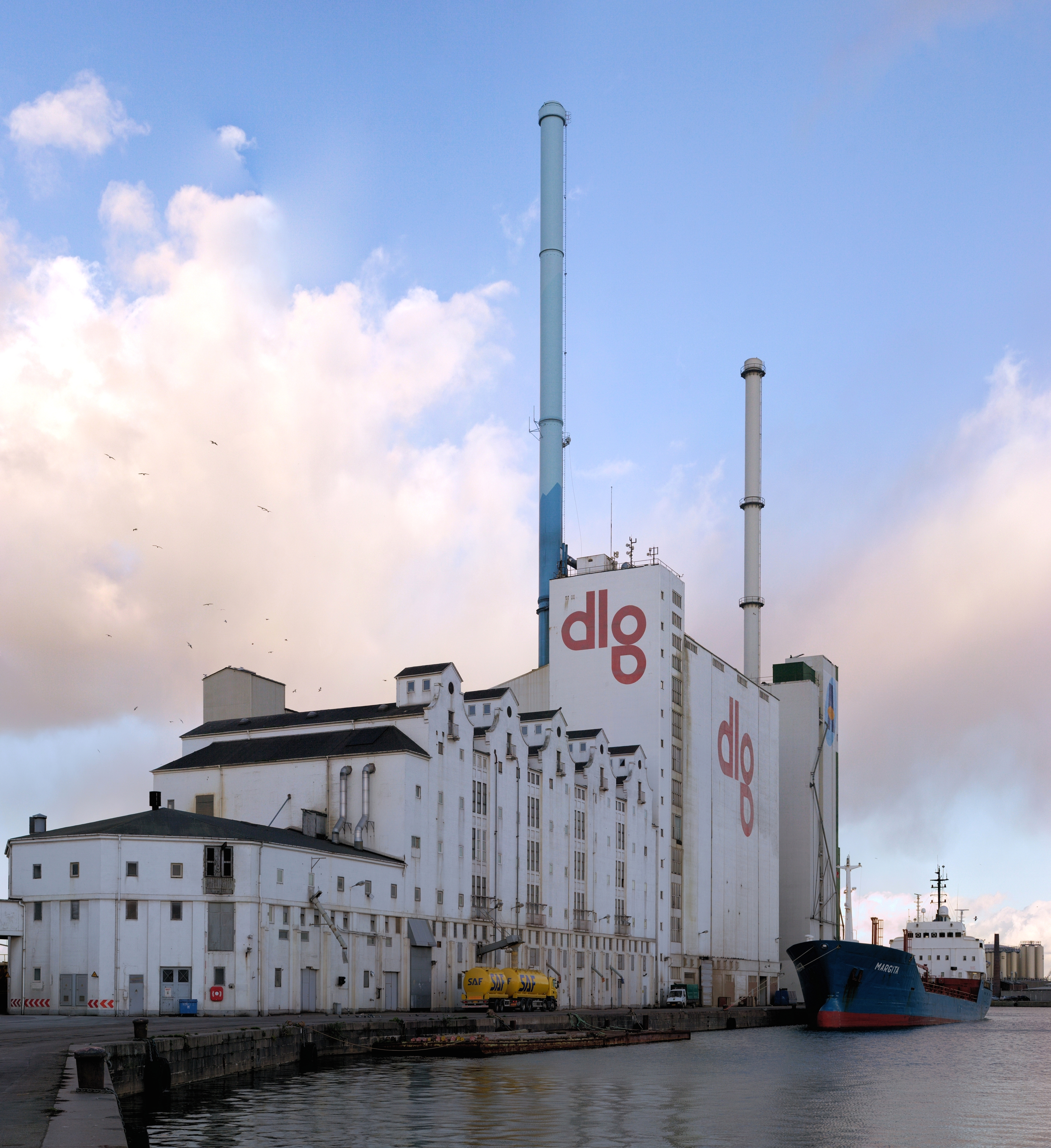

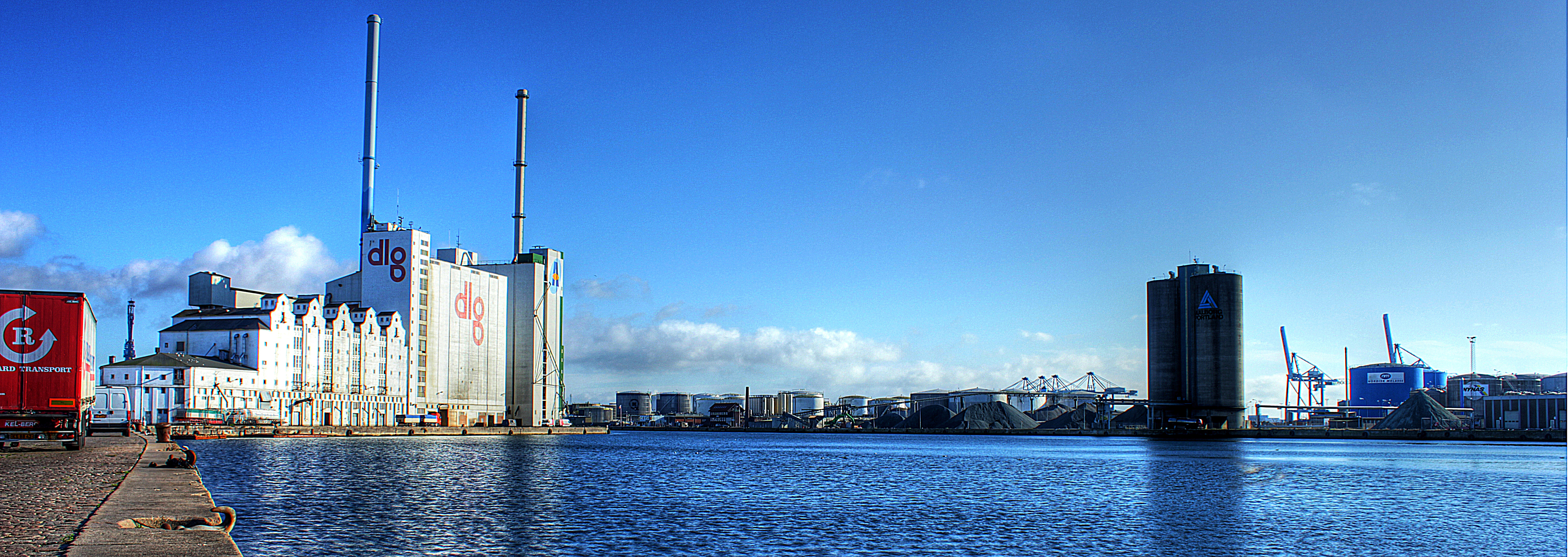
