= Tangkrogen =

Public park in Aarhus, Denmark

Coordinates: 56.138161°N 10.209472°E

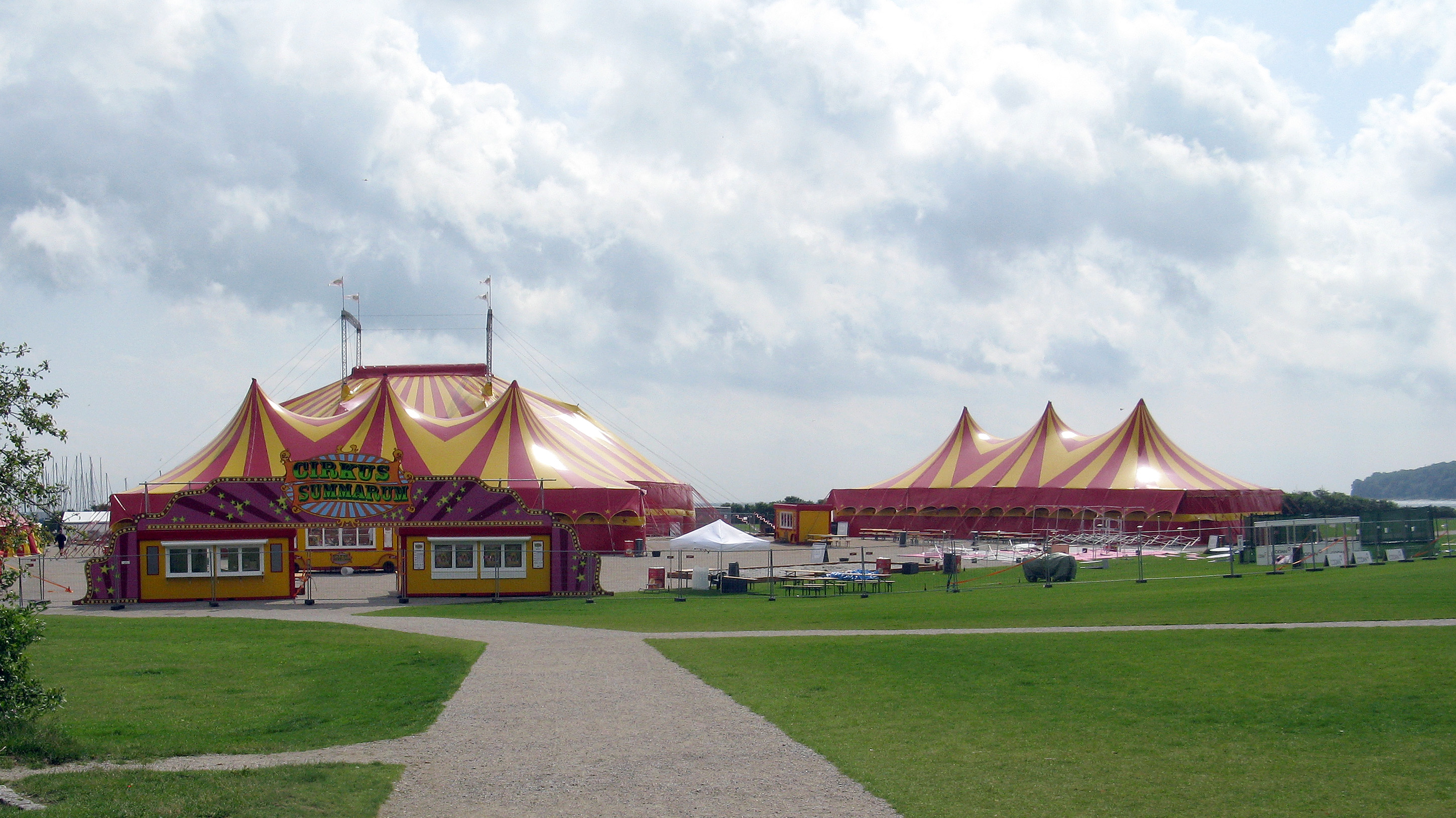
- Circus in Tangkrogen
- Interactive map of Tangkrogen
- Type: Urban park
- Location: Aarhus, Denmark
- Area: 9.884 acres (4.000 ha)
- Owner: Aarhus Municipality

Tangkrogen (lit.: The Kelp-nook) is a public park in Aarhus, Denmark. The park is situated in the neighborhood Midtbyen by the coast with the Bay of Aarhus to the southeast, the Marselisborg neighborhood to the West and the Port of Aarhus to the North. The park is bounded by Strandvejen and Marselis Havnevej across from Chr. Filtenborgs Square. It is a municipal park managed by the Nature and Environment department (Danish: Natur og Miljø) of Aarhus Municipality. Tangkrogen got its name from the kelp that filled the cove when recreational jetties were constructed when the city of Aarhus initially developed the area into a public park in the early 20th century.

== Overview ==
The park is 9.884 acres of open grassy fields, clay covered event spaces and a part of the coastline, used as a berthing area for small recreational boats such as kayaks and dinghies. The park is the main event venue in Aarhus and it is divided between different areas designed for different purposes. The central area is dubbed Cirkus Pladsen (Circus Square), is a 2700 acres clay covered venue frequently used by travelling circuses, markets and other events that require fixed structures or heavy machinery. Adjacent to it is 3400 acres of grassy fields designed for durability and smaller structures such as tents. The park is bounded by 3707 acres of grassy recreational areas with trees and bushes mainly intended for daily low intensity use.

The park includes water fountains in different areas, sewers and public toilets and is rated to host up to 20.000 visitors. There are 500 adjacent parking spaces and it lies close to public transport from Strandvejen, Chr. Filtenborgs Plads and Hans Broges Gade. The park has through the years been host to many of the largest events in Aarhus including the annual solstitial celebration celebrations, Sculpture by the Sea, circuses, the Food Festival, fairs, markets, festivals and concerts.

== Gallery ==
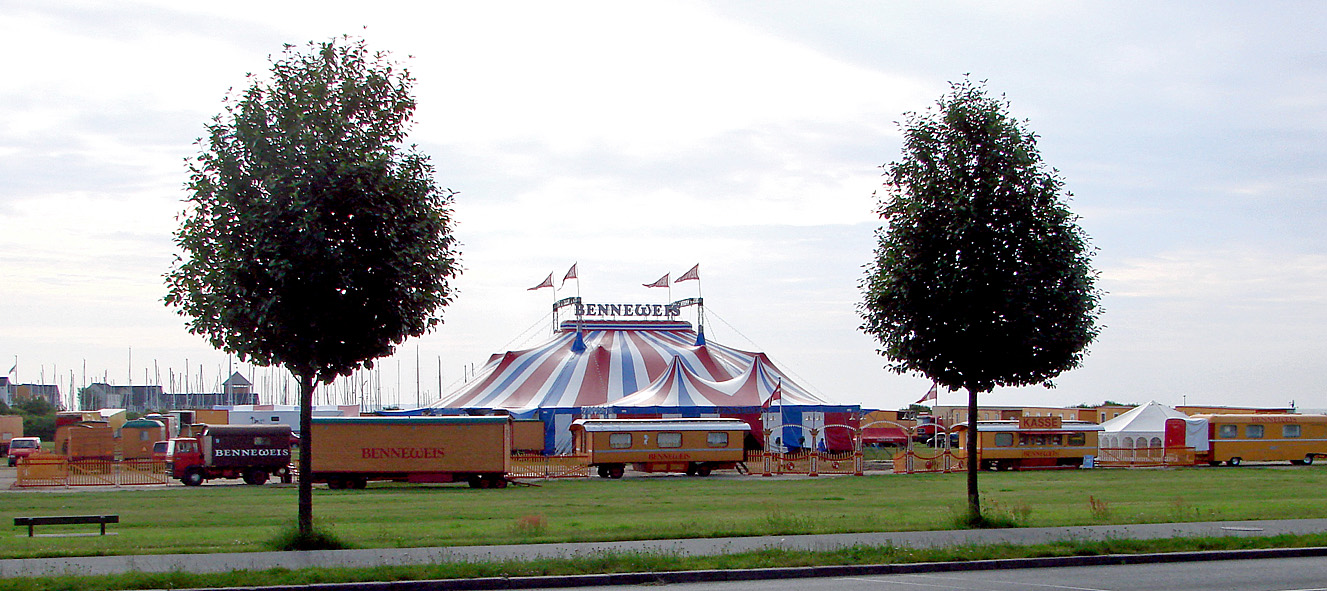

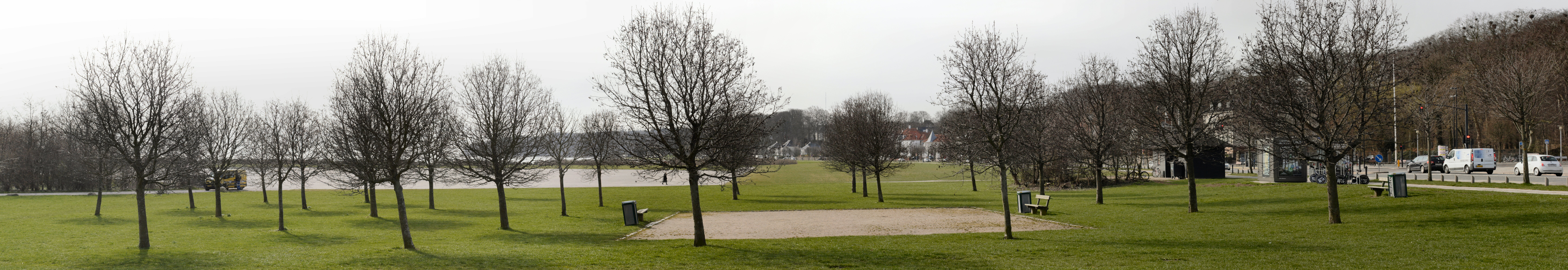

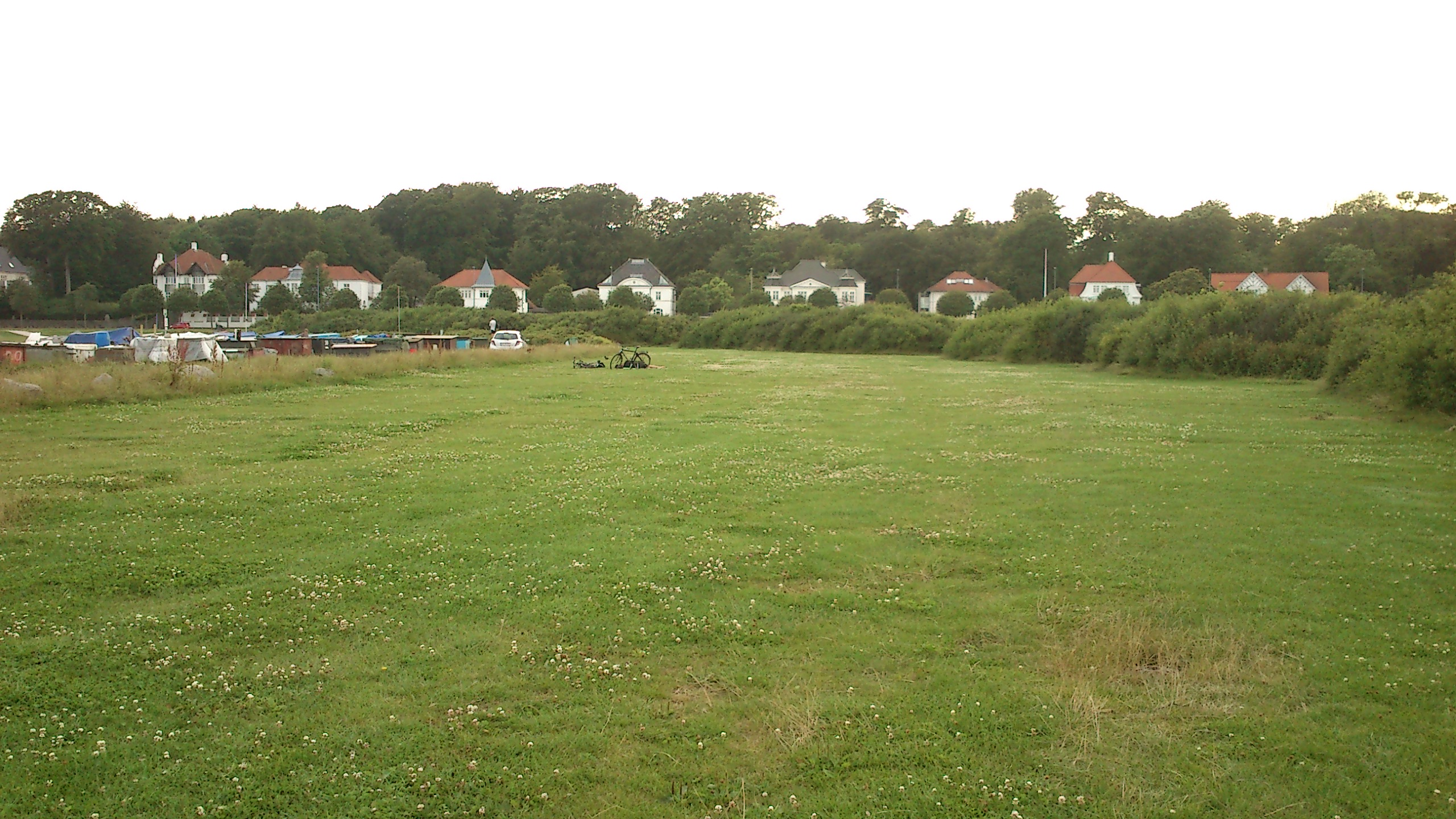
Lawns for recreational activities

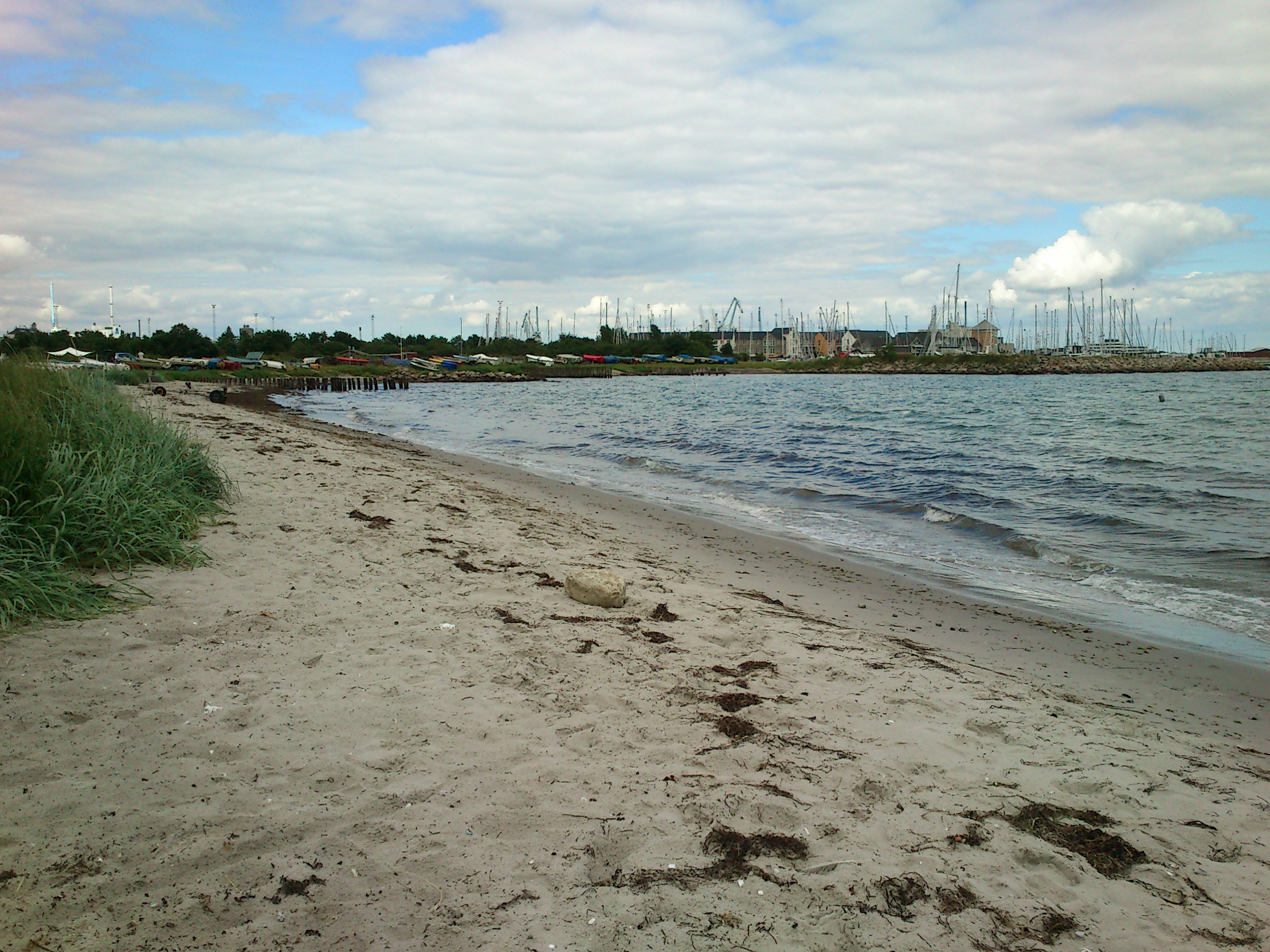
The beach

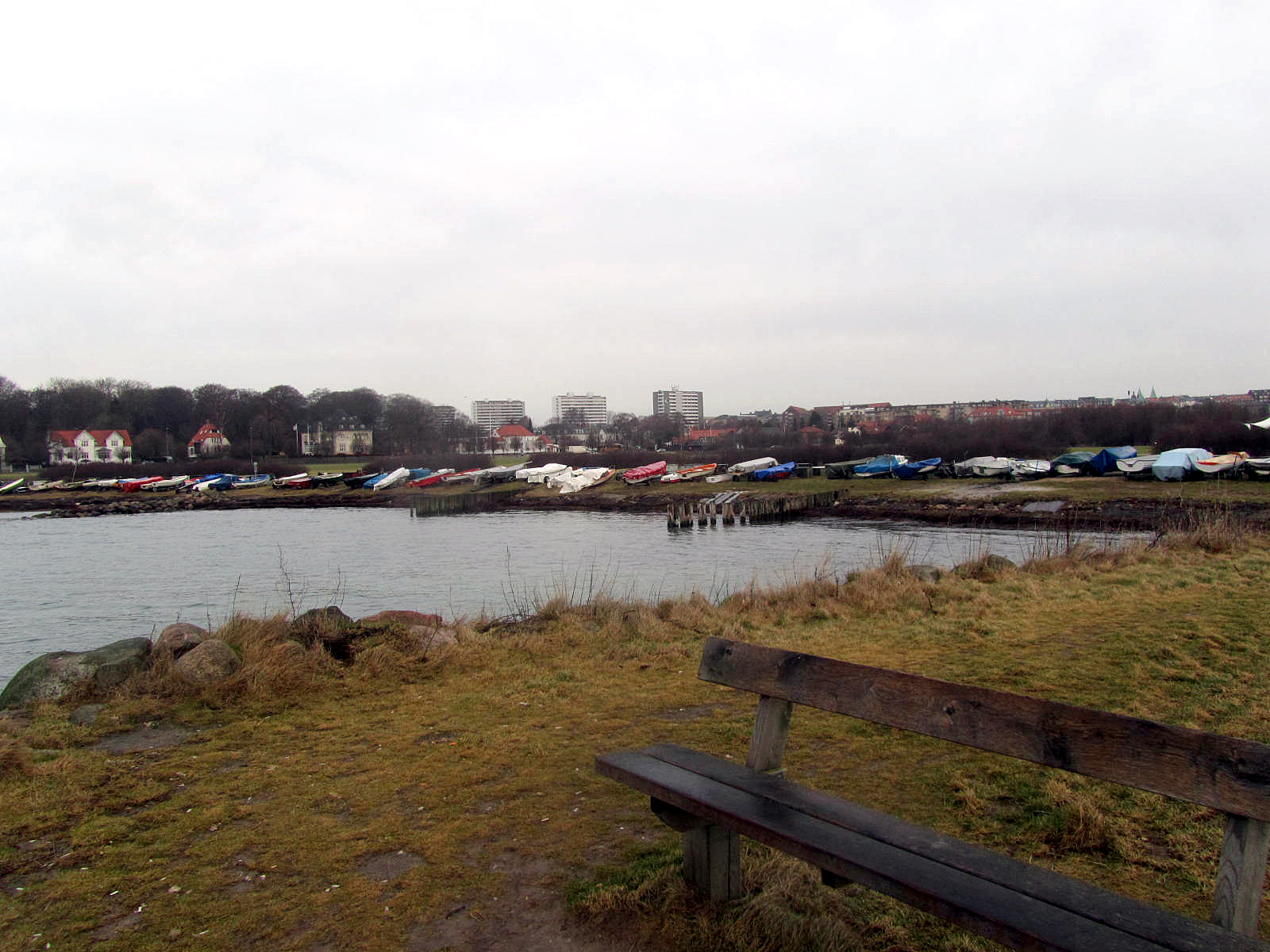
Winter scene. View towards the cove with beached boats

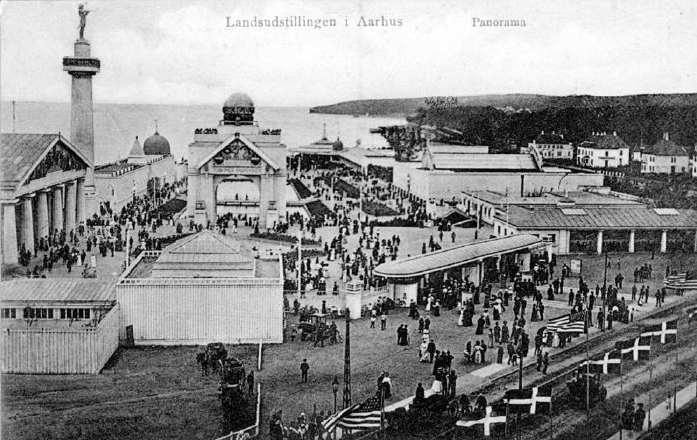
Historical photo from the National Exhibition in 1909
