= Danish National Exhibition of 1909 =

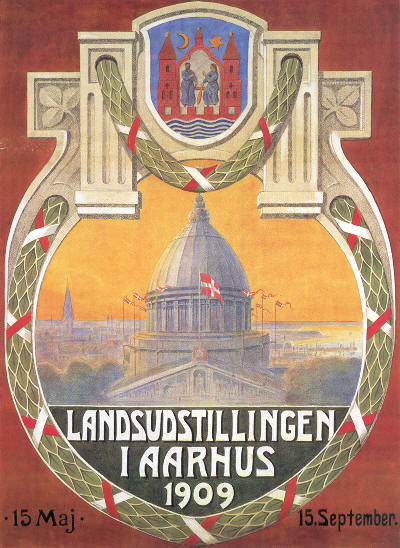
- Official poster by Valdemar Andersen
- Native name: Landsudstillingen i Aarhus
- Date: 18 May 1909
- Duration: 4 months
- Location: Aarhus; 56.138°N 10.209°E
- Type: Exposition

The Danish National Exhibition of 1909 or The National Exhibition in Aarhus 1909 (Danish: Landsudstillingen i Aarhus) was an industry, crafts and culture exhibition held in Aarhus, Denmark in 1909 from 18 May to 3 October. The exhibition displayed some 1850 individual works by architects, artists, craftsmen and businesses and attracted 650.000 visitors. The project was a large undertaking for the city with long-lasting effects on cultural institutions and short-term economic problems. The exhibition fairgrounds was named The white City (Danish: Den Hvide By) based on the architectural expression chosen by the leading architect Anton Rosen.

The exhibition was generally received well in the press and was widely considered a success. Although it ran over budget, resulted in significant economic losses and it did not accrue the expected economic benefits to local businesses the exhibition had both more visitors and revenue than projected. Historians have since discussed if it had any benefits to the city but it can be said to have cemented Aarhus as the leading provincial city in Denmark at least in the minds of its people.

== Prelude ==
The large industry and crafts exhibitions started in France where yearly art salons had been held since the 1600s. The terror of the French Revolution in 1789 dampened the French economy and it became necessary to strengthen trade and industry so in 1797 a large exhibition was held in the Louvre. The following year the exhibition moved to a separate area with buildings constructed for the purpose which was the beginning of the large national exhibitions. Industry exhibitions soon popped up across Europe with some 150 national and regional exhibitions being held up to the mid-1800s. In 1851 England held The Great Exhibition, the first World Exposition, which became an annual tradition.

The large exhibitions across Europe left an impression in Denmark and from the early 1800s a number of large and small exhibitions were held primarily in Copenhagen. The first was held in 1810 but the first major success was in 1852 when an exhibition was held on the grounds of Christiansborg Palace. The Danish state contributed economically and the exhibition achieved 100.000 visitors in 3 months. Several large exhibitions in Copenhagen followed including the Nordic Exhibition of 1888.

In the rest of the country other cities and towns followed the trend. In 1833 and 1834 the council chambers in Aarhus hosted small arts and crafts exhibitions and 1852 the Craftmen's Association held a larger exhibition on Fredens Torv in a building constructed for the purpose. In 1876 a larger exhibition was held in Vennelystparken where a dedicated building complex had been erected. The exhibition was opened by King Christian IX and it was the first major exhibition outside Copenhagen. Around the turn of the century discussions opened to host another large event during the tri-decennial anniversary of the 1876 exhibition. Preparation were underway but in 1904 it was decided to hold an exhibition for Jutland in Horsens in 1906. It was agreed that another regional exhibition in Aarhus so soon after was impractical so plans were changed to instead host a larger national exhibition in 1909.

The effort won wide support in the city and wider region but in Copenhagen the media was more split on the issue. Particularly the newspaper Politiken was a vocal opponent and preferred a national exhibition be held in the capital over the smaller cities in Jutland. In the end the plans for an event in Copenhagen didn't work out and Aarhus won support from the state. Aarhus Municipality supported the exhibition with DKK 300.000, the state gave DKK 150.000 and a number of companies and individuals provided an additional guarantee of DKK 300.000 to cover any losses.

== Construction ==
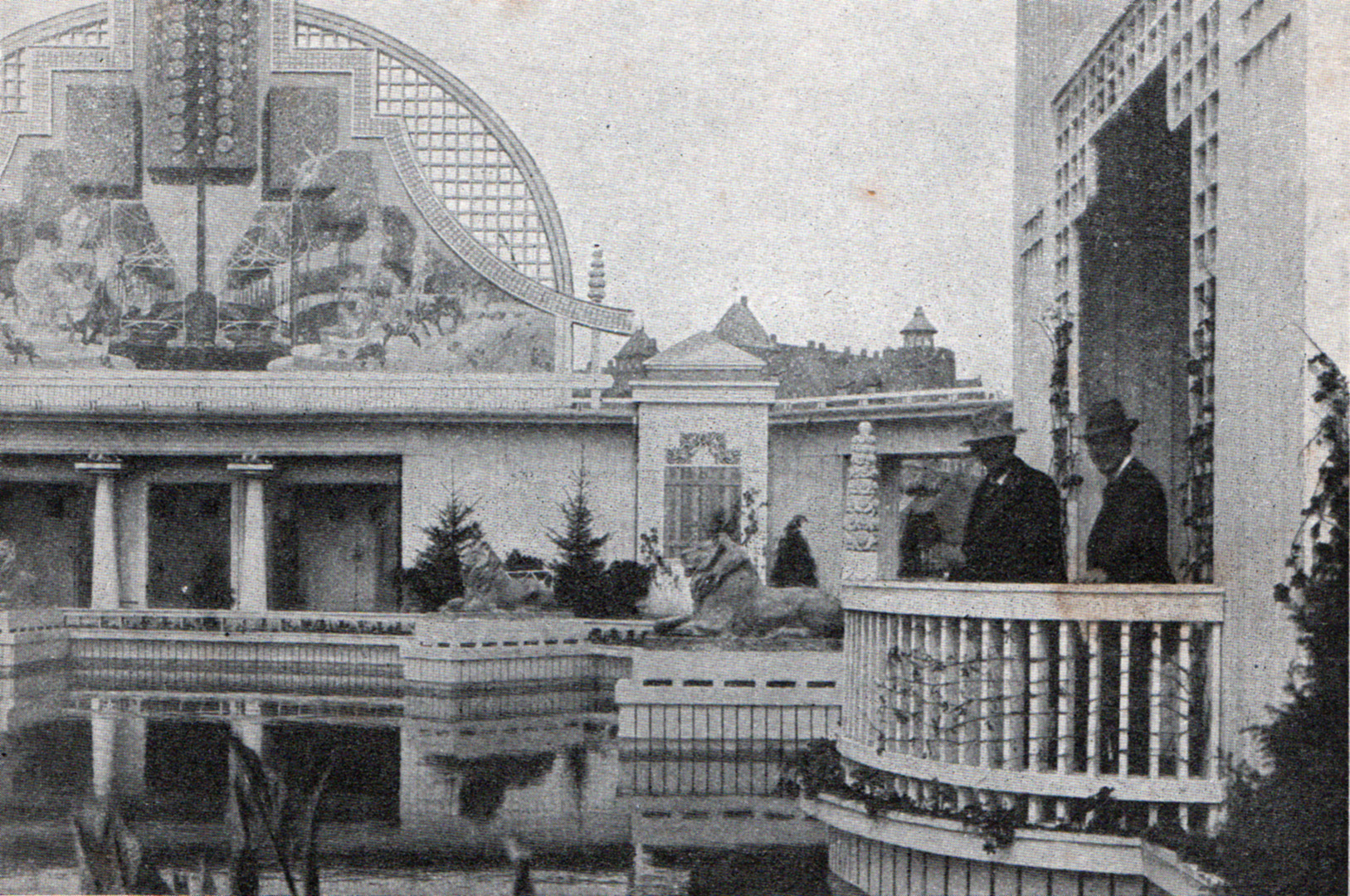
Anton Rosen on a balcony overlooking the Garden Hall during the construction phase.

The architect Anton Rosen was commissioned to organize the exhibition since he had experience from events in Odense in 1900 and Haslev in 1906. Rosen was given free rein to decide where the fairgrounds should be placed. He selected an area of 70 acres by the coast south of the city and north of the Marselisborg Forests where present day Strandparken and Tangkrogen is situated. The location had the Bay of Aarhus, forest and city within view which provided a scenic canvas for architects to display their works. The location was ideal from an artistic standpoint but it was also more expensive; roads had to be redirected and the expansion of the nearby Port of Aarhus was put on standby.

The planning for the project took 4 years and required thousands of workers that came from across Jutland to work on it. The large area was developed from a basic field to a planned town with a number of large halls, gardens, amusement park and other projects. To accommodate the many guests the newly built Skansepalæet was turned into a hotel with 210 rooms, 430 beds and a café on the ground floor with a view over the fairgrounds. In the Marselisborg Forests the restaurant Varna Palæet was constructed and on Dalgas Avenue and Marselisvej 9 villas were built to demonstrate the best architecture and crafts of the time.

In the final days before the opening a number of accidents threatened the project. On 16 May the designer and decorator Valdemar Andersen fell from a scaffold and suffered injuries preventing him from finishing his works. On 17 May a powerful storm flooded the fairgrounds and left foul smelling seaweed behind. The windows in the large exhibition halls were broken and most items had to have been covered in tarps for protection. During the night of 18 May 3000 workers were called in to make repairs and lay out wooden walkways across the flooded areas. However, the exhibition was opened as planned.

== The White City ==
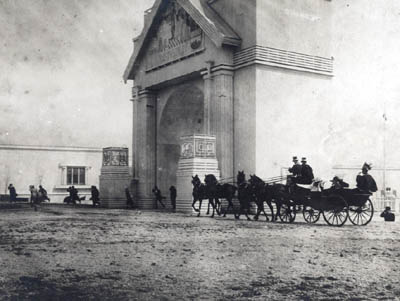
The royal coach on opening day going to the Vault Hall with the industry exhibition

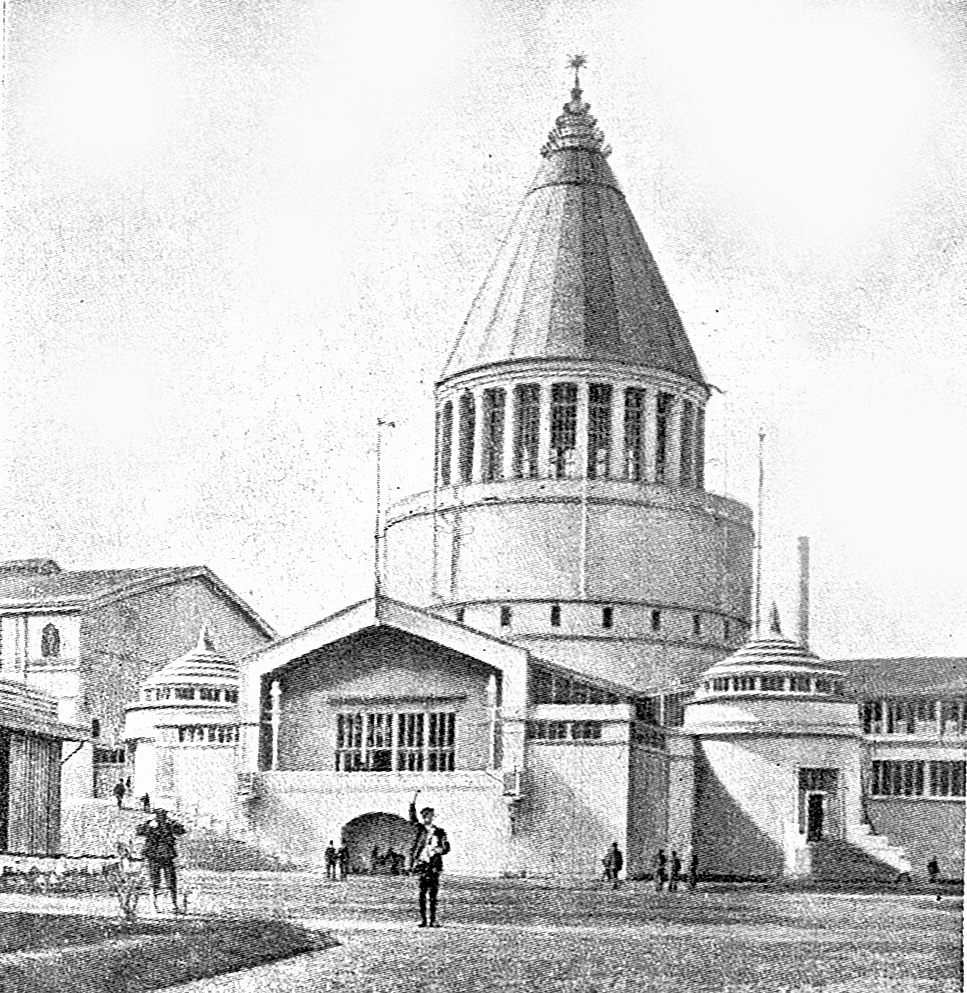
The Electricity Tower by Anton Rosen

The exhibition was opened 18 May 1909 by King Frederick VIII and Queen Louise along with Crown Prince Christian and Crown Princess Alexandrine. The royal entourage drove from the harbor to the fairgrounds in open landaus where the opening ceremony was held in the Solennitetssal (English: Ceremonial Hall) before an audience of 1500 selected guests accompanied by music performed by Royal Conductor Carl Nielsen.

The two largest halls, the Vault Hall (Buehallen) and the Column Hall (Søjlehallen), were situated by the main entrance and showcased crafts, industry and furniture design. Accessible from the two large halls was the centerpiece of the exhibition, the iconic Electricity Tower (Danish: Elektricitetstårnet), depicted on many posters and other promotional art. Other halls included Machine Hall showing industrial machines, the Transport Hall focused on cars and trucks, a hall containing the art exhibit and a building housing the Post and Telegraph Agency and various municipal institutions. The Ceremonial Hall was used for the opening ceremony, the lotteries and other official events. Along with the large show halls there was a number of pavilions such as the white Press Pavilion and Politiken's pavilion showing a printing press in action.

Outdoor exhibitions included the fishery with an adjacent restaurant, an area for gardening and agriculture and an area with crafts and culture items from Greenland. Tuborg had erected a large Triumphal arch at one end of a basin facing a pagoda pavilion at the other end. For a fee there was admittance to a separate amusement park with carousels, swings, a dance hall, a cinema and an artificial Abyssinian village. Outside the fairgrounds across Dalgas Avenue was an area with changing exhibits featuring cattle and riding shows, gymnastics, dog and rabbit shows and balloon displays.

Architectural displays was a central element of exhibitions at the time and a separate Station Town had been erected to showcase best practices in construction and architecture. It was modeled to be an ideal small railway town and was complete with dairy, railway station, pharmacy, community centre and other structures. Additional villas had been constructed on nearby roads some of which were awarded as prizes in lotteries.

=== Participating architects ===
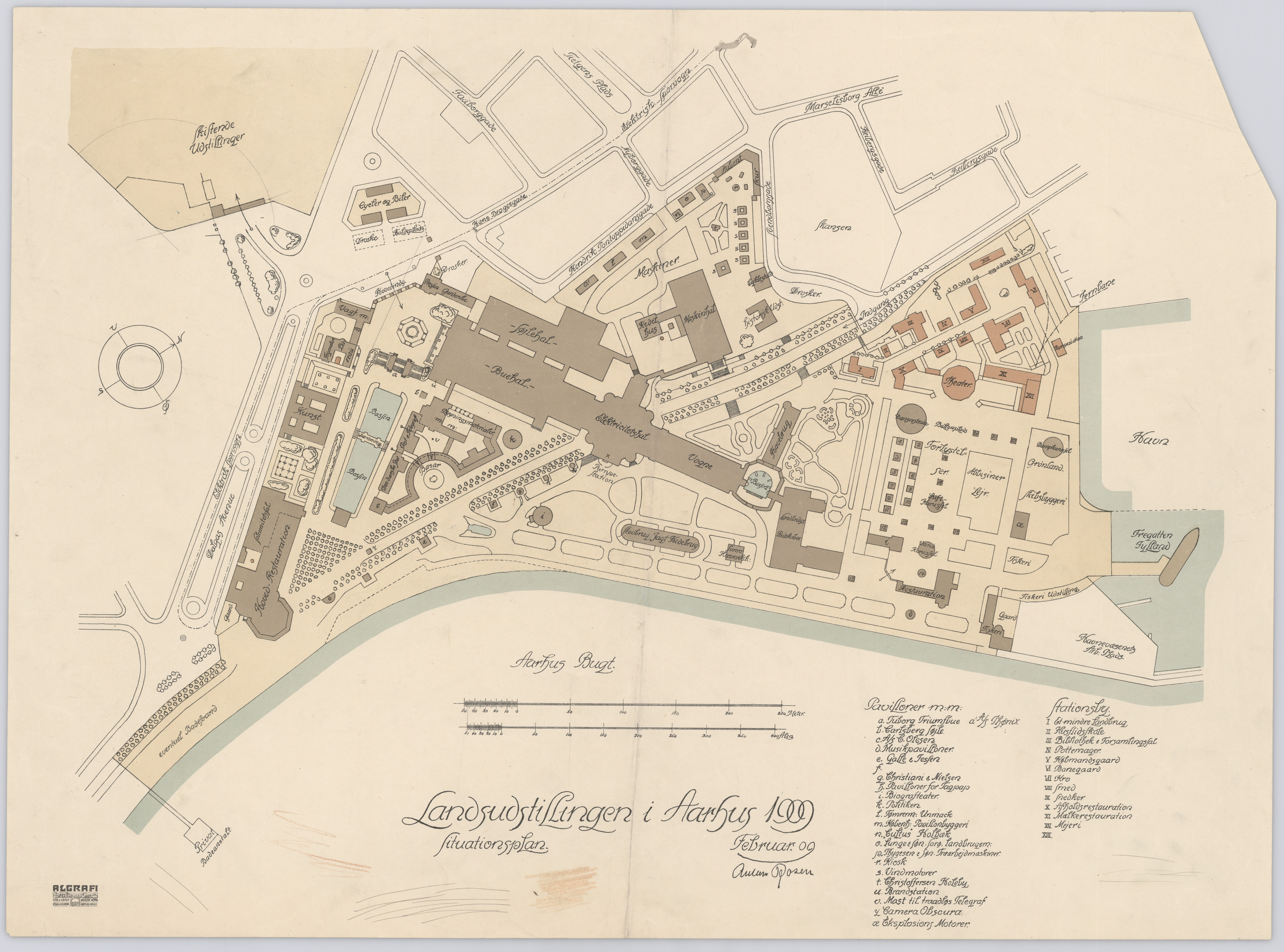
Plan of the exhibition area.

- Anton Rosen (manager) – (Politiken's pavilion, elektricity tower, portal).
- Einar Ambt
- Gustav Bartholin Hagen
- Peder Vilhelm Jensen-Klint – (Town smithy)
- Thorvald Jørgensen
- Hack Kampmann – (Planning for the Station Town)
- Jens Christian Kofoed
- Sophus Frederik Kühnel
- Sven Risom – (Clog-makers house)
- Heinrich Wenck

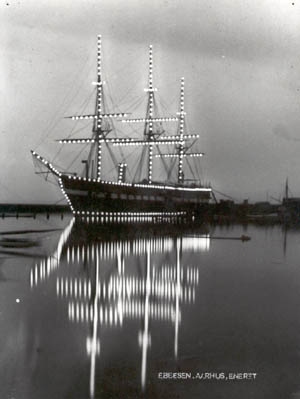
The steam frigate Jylland

== Historical Exhibit ==
The exhibition was mainly focused on the machines and products of industrialization and the modern architectural styles but some historical elements had been included. The half-timbered Secherske gård (English: Secher's House) from 1597 was disassembled piece by piece and erected on the fairgrounds where it showcased the lives of the upper classes in the past centuries with young women dressed in traditional folk costumes serving coffee and waiting on visitors. The steam frigate Jylland had been decommissioned in 1888 and was scheduled to be broken up in 1908 but was instead saved, restored and placed in the Bay of Aarhus in front of the fairgrounds as a scenic display.

== Abyssinian Camp ==
The exhibition of 1909 featured a curiosity in the form of an imitation African village complete with a group of 80 Abyssinian people from present day Ethiopia. The village was one of the major attractions of the exhibition. It consisted of straw huts, workshops and imitation palm trees. The village was situated by the coast in the amusement park, neighboring the exhibits about the Danish overseas colonies in Greenland and the West Indies.

The village was part of a cultural phenomenon in the 19th century with displays of "exotic peoples". In the late 1800s more than 50 such displays took place in Denmark, most in Copenhagen in Tivoli, the Zoo and the Circus Building, but a small number did come to the smaller Danish cities. Vennelystparken hosted a Nubian caravan in 1880, Sami in 1888, Indians in 1901, Japanese in 1902 and finally the Abyssinians in 1909.

== Danish-American Day ==
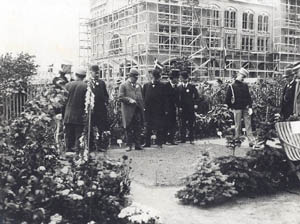
Prince Christian and Niels Neergaard during Danish-American Day

On 4 July 1909 a Danish-American Day was celebrated. In 1905 the Danish-American editor Ivar Kierkegard had suggested that American Independence Day should be celebrated every year with a festival in Denmark for Danish immigrants and their ancestors in the United States. Max Henius, the leader of the Danish-American Society established in 1906, realized the plans and the first meeting was held in 1909 in Aarhus during the exhibition.

In spite of the long journey by sea some 1200 Danish-Americans arrived on the ocean steamer C.F. Tietgen. The city was decorated with Danish and American flags and the facade of the Art Hall was decorated with the same Stars and Stripes that had been used at the main entrance of the St. Louis World's Fair in 1904. The meeting became the precursor to the annual Rebild Festival every year on 4 July in north Jutland.

== Legacy ==
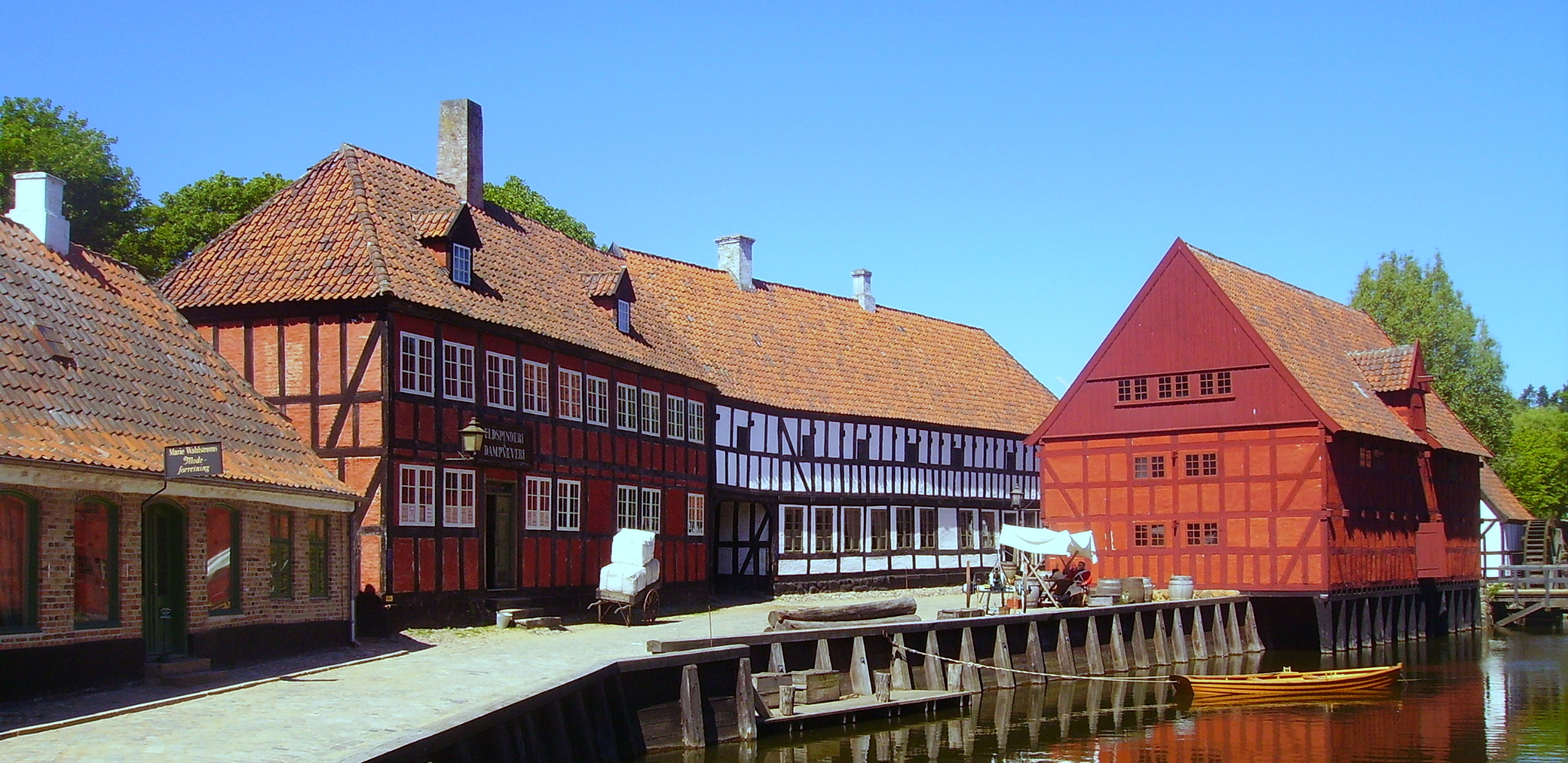
The Old Town Museum

The exhibition had a number of long-lasting effects. The immediate aftermath was economic depression in Aarhus as many local leading businesses and businessmen had incurred significant losses and couldn't invest in the city for some years. The period after the exhibition was a time of growth in the other major provincial cities of Aalborg, Odense and Esbjerg but Aarhus struggled for almost 6 years. However, long-term the exhibition had a significant cultural impact and resulted in a number of prominent landmarks.

The Old Town Museum was established with Secher's House, also known as the Mayors House, as the first building with Peter Holm as its first director. The museum has since grown to a major visitor attraction and a neighborhood in its own right. Initially the Mayors House was left standing on the former fairgrounds for almost 5 years but in 1914 Peter Holm managed to collect the funds to have it moved and to establish the museum. During the 2009 centennial of the exhibition Politiken's pavilion, colloquially known as "The Inkwell" (Danish: Blækhuset), was rebuilt in The Old Town. It had previously been moved to Nærum on Zealand where it was used as a communal building for allotments. The pavilion today houses the exhibition hall of the Danish Poster Museum and is a part of the museum's 1950s neighborhood which was built in the 2010s.

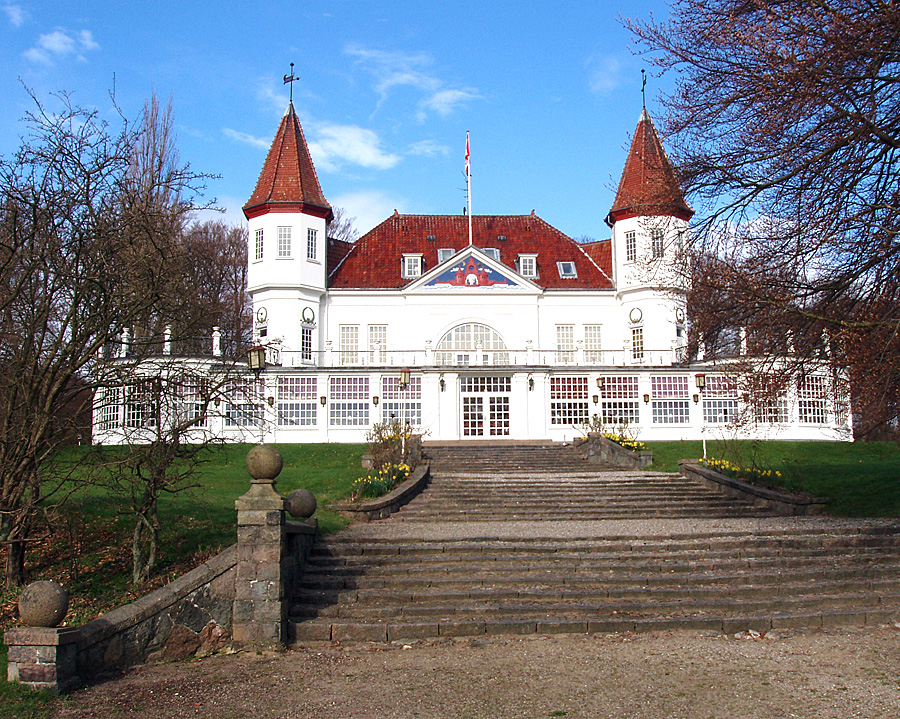
Varnapalæet in Marselisborg Forests

The exhibition cemented Aarhus as the largest provincial city and psychologically gave it a characteristic self-confidence. When Copenhagen built its first stadium in 1916 Aarhus followed shortly by building the Atletion stadium in 1920 and Aarhus University was established in 1928 almost 40 years before universities were opened in other provincial cities. The logo of Aarhus university features two dolphins referencing the dolphin depicted on the 1909 exhibition seal.

In the city Varna Palæet by Eggert Achen and Skansepalæet by Hjalmar Kjær remains the most visible artifacts. Varna Palæet is home to a restaurant in the Marselisborg Forests and Skansepalæet marks the boundary of the dense city center and the larger and more expansive planned developments of later years. The former site of the exhibition is today the public park Tangkrogen on the waterfront and is still used for larger public events.

The exhibition had implications outside Aarhus as well. The Rebild Festival was started by the many Danish-American visitors and remains an annual recurring event on the 4th of July celebrating the American Independence Day and the homecoming of Danish emigrants. The Frigate Jutland was moved to Ebeltoft in 1960 where it was restored and is today on permanent display in a dry dock as a visitor attraction. The buildings given as prizes at the exhibition lotteries are still in use today. The villas remain on Marselisvej while the farm house designed by Hack Kampmann was won by a farmer who moved it to Aars where it remains largely intact today.

== Significance ==
Historians are divided on the long-term significance of the exhibition. Johan Bender ses it as an important moment in the development of Aarhus into the primary city in Jutland over Viborg or Aalborg. The exhibition underlined the leading position of the city in Jutland and it was part of the reason why the first university outside Copenhagen was established there and not in Viborg. Historian Erik Korr Johansen has pointed out that the economy of Aarhus suffered in the decades after 1910, that the relative advantage in population growth was diminished and that the central position of the city had already been cemented with the central location on the railroad.

The motives are also opaque and have been interpreted differently. According to Erik Korr Johansen industrial businesses had already lost interest in the large exhibitions with the growing importance of advertising and that the exhibition in 1909 was primarily supported by local craftsmen. Johan Bender stresses the agreements and work done across political divides and the identity and historical consciousness in Aarhus resulting from the event. Jens Engberg also consider the organisational and political cooperation of the crafts and employers around 1900 to be important. The banks, industry and crafts worked together against trade unions, the Social Democratic Party and the burgeoning cooperatives. The white city was a prestige project which employers could find common ground in to create a temporary united front against the new political ideas of the 20th century.

== Gallery ==
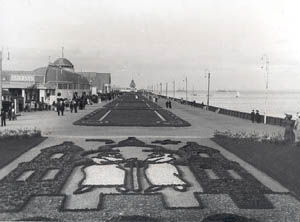
Aarhus City Seal in flowers by the main entrance

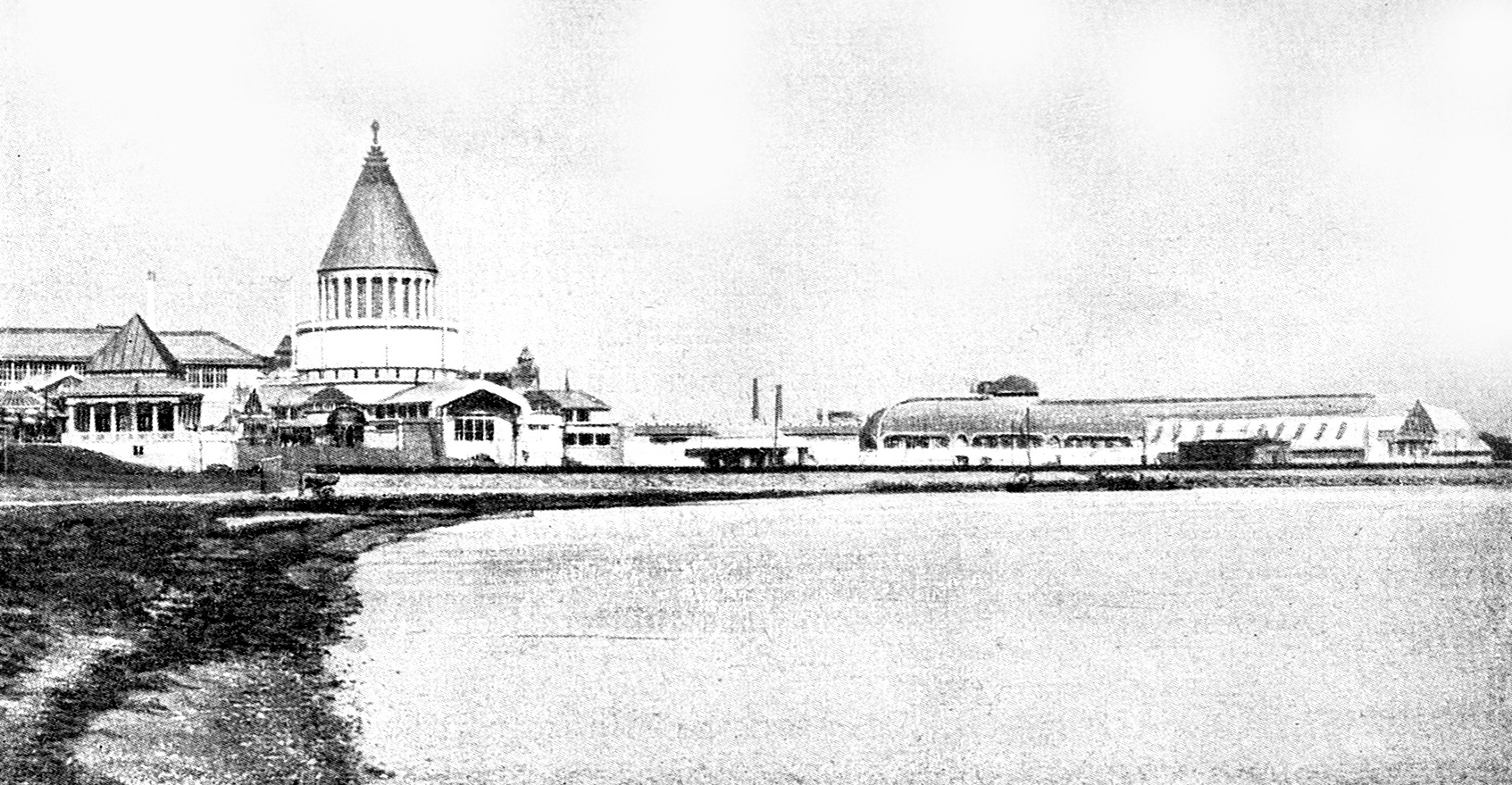
View of the fairgrounds from the north

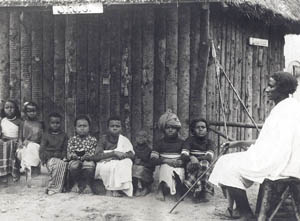
The Abyssinian Camp

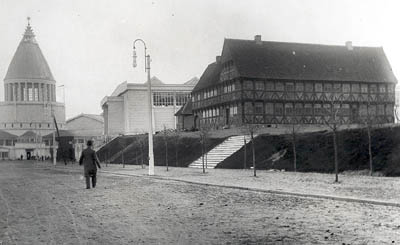
Mayor's House or Secher's House and the electricity Tower

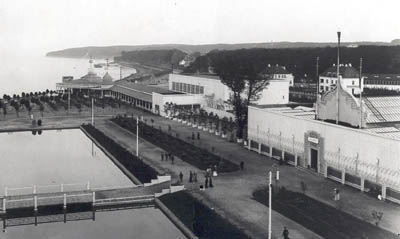
The main restaurant

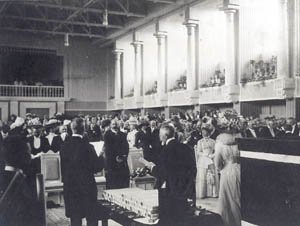
The Ceremonial Hall during a lottery

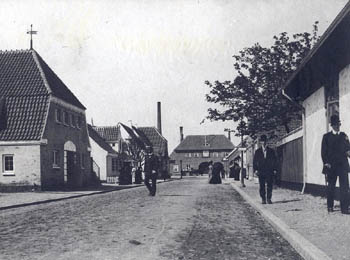
The Station Town

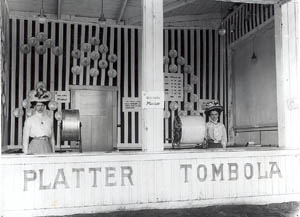
Raffle prizes

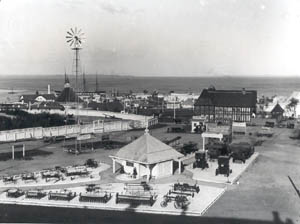
Farm equipment exhibition

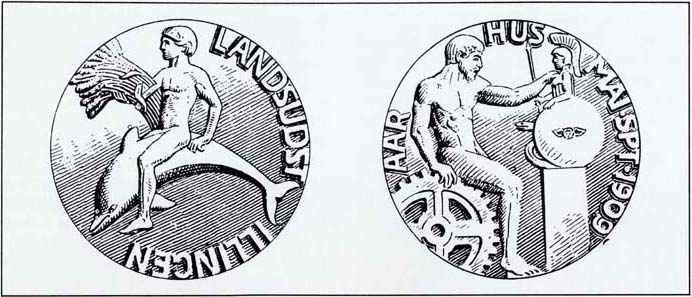
Official seal of the exhibition

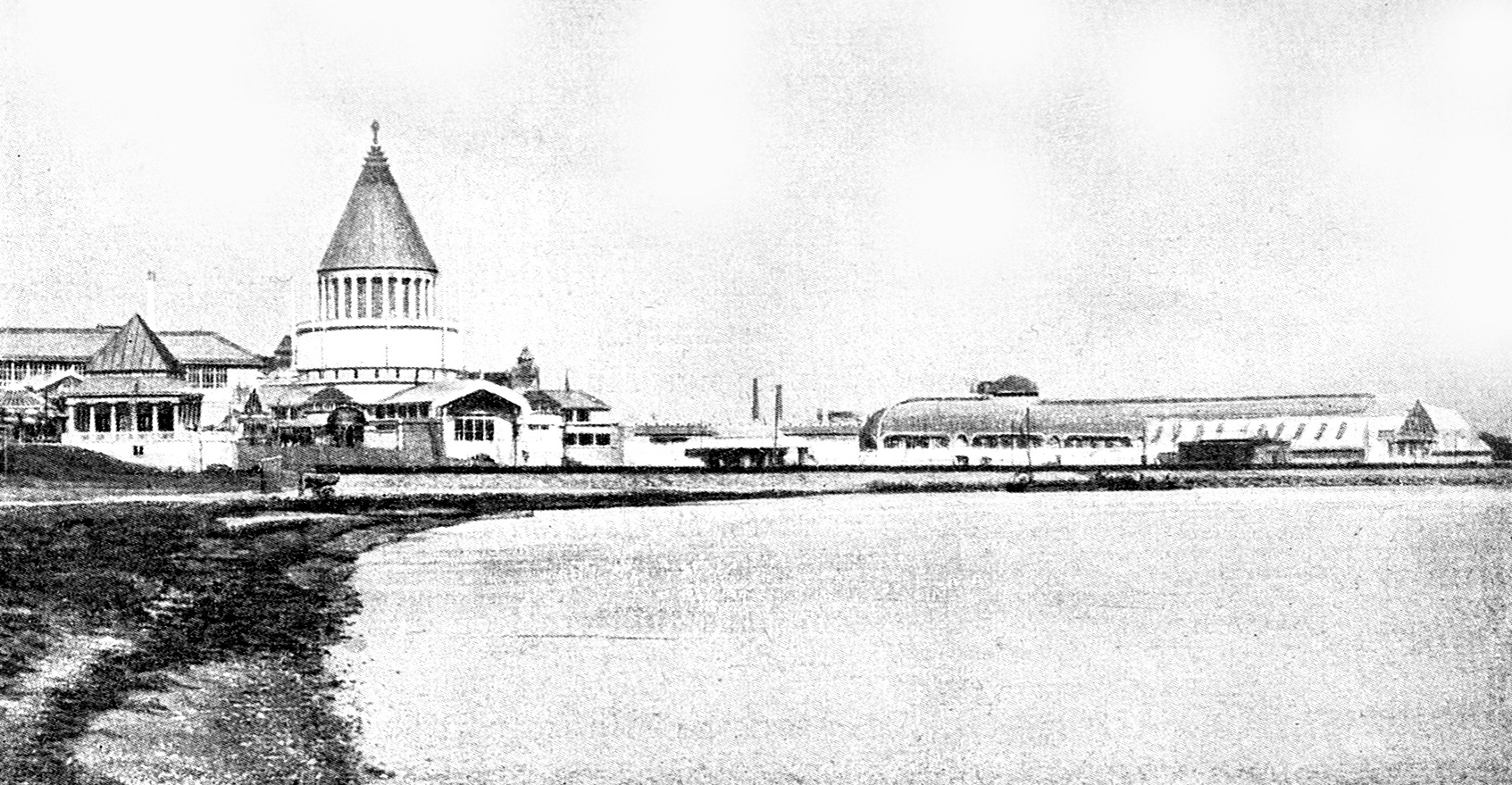
Udstillingen set fra Tangkrogen

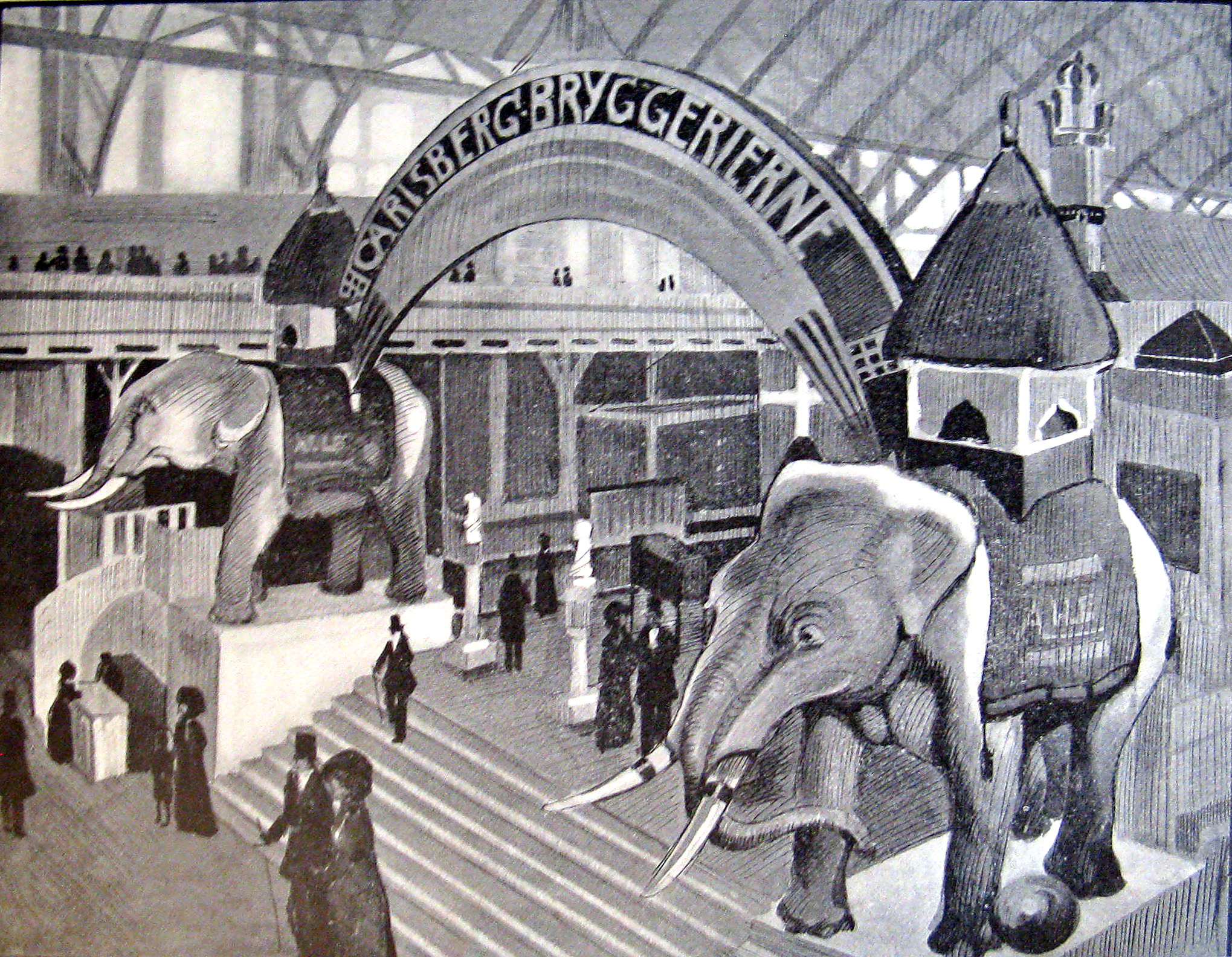
Carlsberg's display in the hall of industry

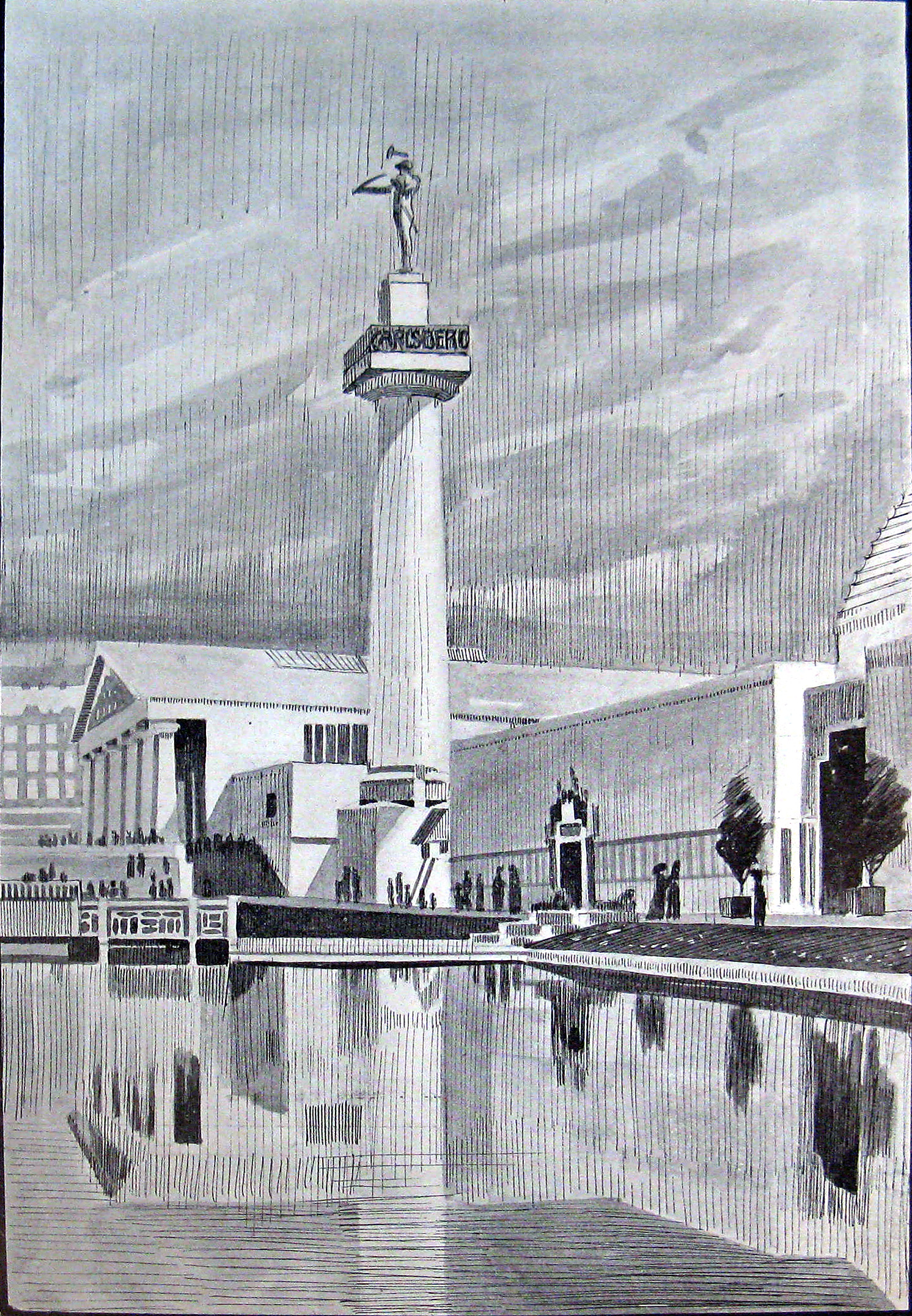
Carlsberg's victory column

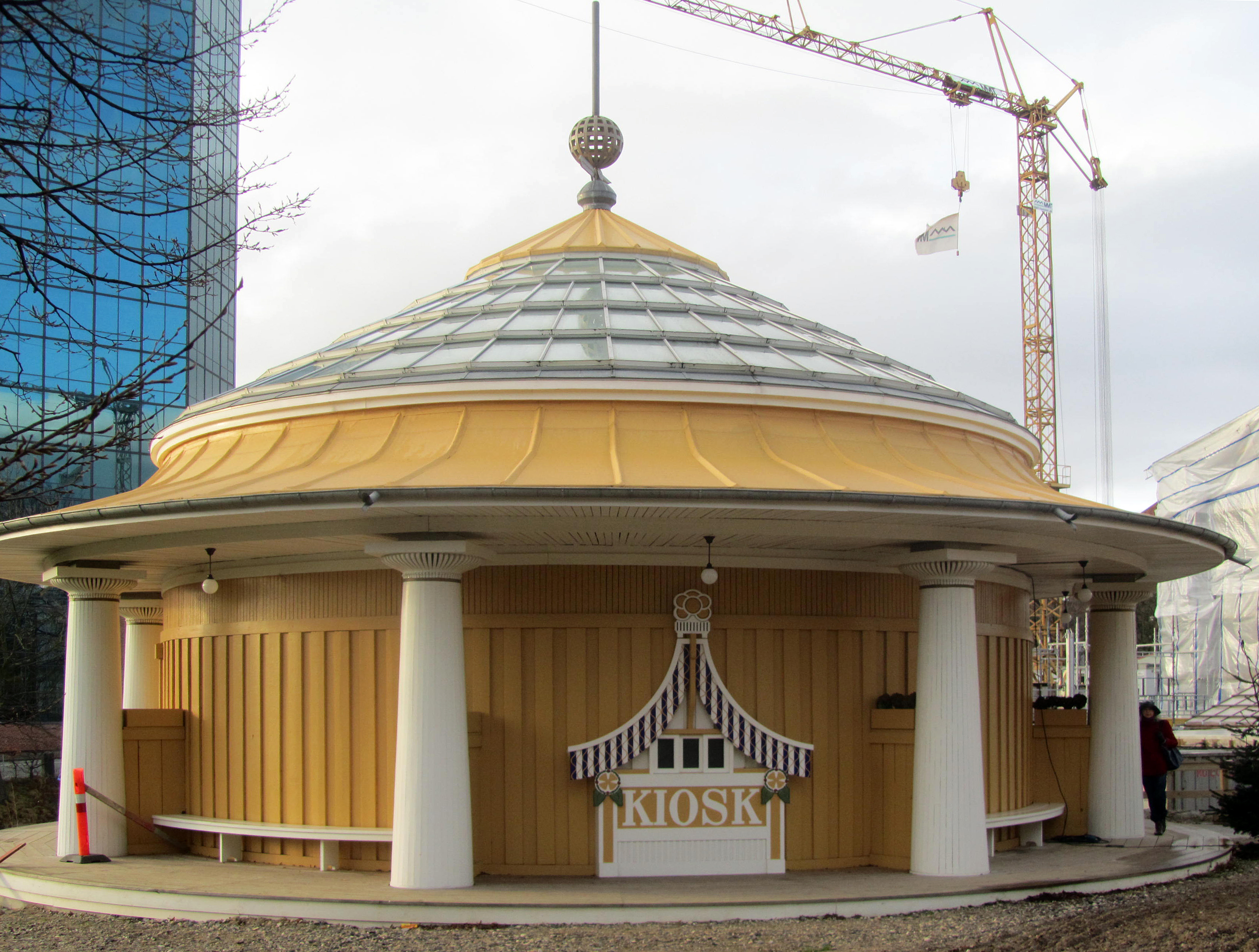
Politiken's pavilion in Den Gamle By in 2009

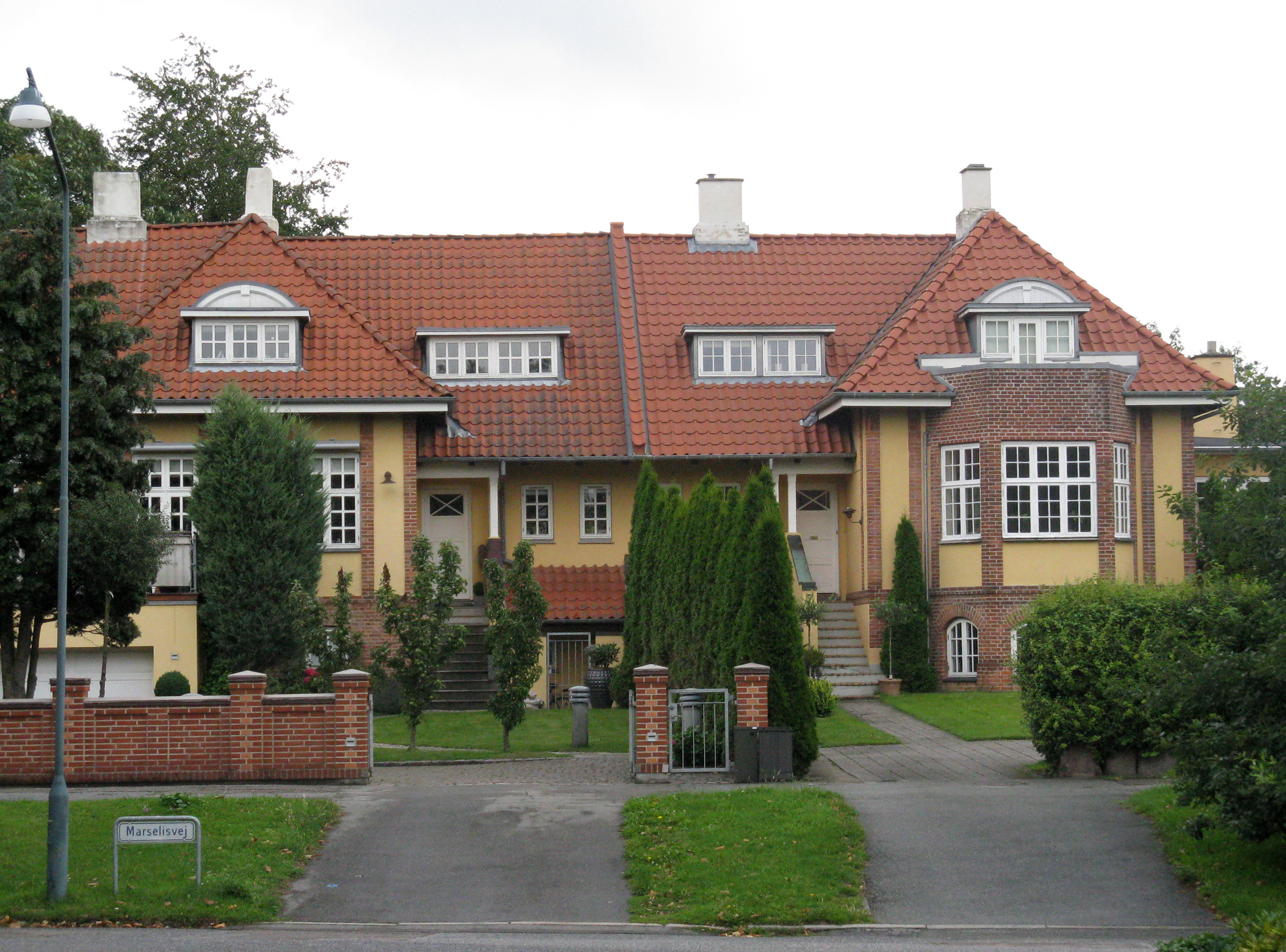
One of the demonstration villas constructed
