= List of Industrial Heritage Sites of Denmark =

Industrial Heritage Sites of Denmark refer to a list of 25 heritage sites in Denmark that was designated by the Danish Agency for Culture (Kulturarvsstyrelsen, now Kulturstyrelsen) in 2007. The list features Danish industrial buildings representing different eras, industries and geographical regions.

== List ==
Name	Location	Year	Description	Image	Refs
Holmen	Copenhagen	1790s	Former naval dockyard		Ref
Mølle River	North Zealand	c. 1140	Small River in the northern outskirts of Copenhagen with many early industrial enterprises such as Brede Works and Rådvad		Ref
Frederiksværk	North Zealand	1750	Industrial town founded by Johan Frederik Classen in 1750		Ref
Carlsberg	Copenhagen	1840s	The Carlsberg Brewery's original brewery site founded by J. C. Jacobsen		Ref
TASSO/Albani Site	Odense	1850s	The former site of an iron foundry founded in 1856 (Tasso) and a brewery founded in 1859 (Albani), featuring a combination of industrial buildings and workers' housing		Ref
Rud. Rasmussen	Copenhagen	1876	Still operating furniture manufactury established c. 1876 by Rudolf Rasmussen in the Nørrebro district of Copenhagen		Ref
Holeby Sugar Factory	Lolland	1874	Former sugar factory in Holeby which operated from 1874 until 1959		Ref
Hjedding Dairy	South Jutland	1882	Denmark's first cooperative dairy, founded in Hjedding near Varde in 1882		Ref
Bornholm's quarries	Bornholm		Bornholm's granite, sandstone, coal and kaolinite quarries that are not found elsewhere in Denmark		Ref
Grøns Pakhus	Copenhagen	1863	Denmark's first department store opened in Holmens Kanal by M. E. Grøn in 1863		Ref
Copenhagen Waterworks	Copenhagen	1859	Denmark's first modern-style waterworks opened in 1859		Ref
Esbjerg Docklands and lighthouse system	Esbjerg				Ref
Copenhagen-Korsør Railway	Zealand	1847	Denmark's first railway opened in two stages in 1847 (Copenhagen–Roskilde) and 1856 (Roskilde–Korsør)		Ref
Brown and White Meat District	Copenhagen	1879	Copenhagen's meat district, first opened in 1879 (The Brown Meat District) and later expanded several times, including in 1932 (The White Meat District)		Ref
Cathrinesminde Brickworks	South Jutland		Brickyard with a ring oven from 1892		Ref
Aalborg Portland	Aalborg				Ref
Danish Distillers	Aalborg	1931	Industrial complex built in 1931 to designs by Alfred Cock-Clausen		Ref
H. C. Ørsted Power Station	Copenhagen	1920	Denmark's first power station to use alternating current technology		Ref
The Five Sisters	Aarhus	1927	Silos		Ref
Danfoss	South Jutland	1931	Factory founded in 1931 by Mads Claussen		Ref
Håndværkerbyen	Copenhagen	1931	Post-World War II development for small companies in Valby		Ref
Lindø Dockyards and Munkebo	Odense	1959	Shipyard from 1859 and an associated housing district		Ref
Novozymes	Copenhagen	1935	Novo's first factory built in 1935–1969 to designs by Arne Jacobsen		Ref
Herning's textile industry	Central Jutland				Ref
Coop Danmark	Copenhagen	1963	FDB's headquarters and warehouses in Albertslund		Ref

== See also ==
- Ole Jørgen Rawert
