= Petersen Tegl =

Danish brick manufacturer

- Company type: Private
- Industry: Brick and tile products
- Founded: 1791
- Founder: Peter Andersen
- Headquarters: Broager, Denmark
- Number of employees: 180
- Website: petersen-tegl.dk

Petersen Tegl is a family-owned manufacturer of specialized brick and tile products based at Broager in Sønderjylland, Denmark. The company has collaborated with a number of leading international architects. Its Kolumba brick, developed for the Kolumba Museum in Cologne, has been described as "the world's most expensive brick".

== History ==
Petersen Tegl was founded on 17 May 1791 when local farmer Peter Andersen obtained a royal license to establish a brickworks at Nybøl Nor.

The 28-year-old Christian A. Petersen, seventh generation of the family, returned to Denmark to take over the brickworks when his father died in 1969. He had spent the previous seven years at brickworks and ceramics manufacturers in Germany and Switzerland. Petersen pulled Petersen Tegl out of De Forenede Teglværker in 1993.

== Today ==
Christian A. Petersen owns 51 % of the company while his two daughters each own 24.5 %.

== Products ==
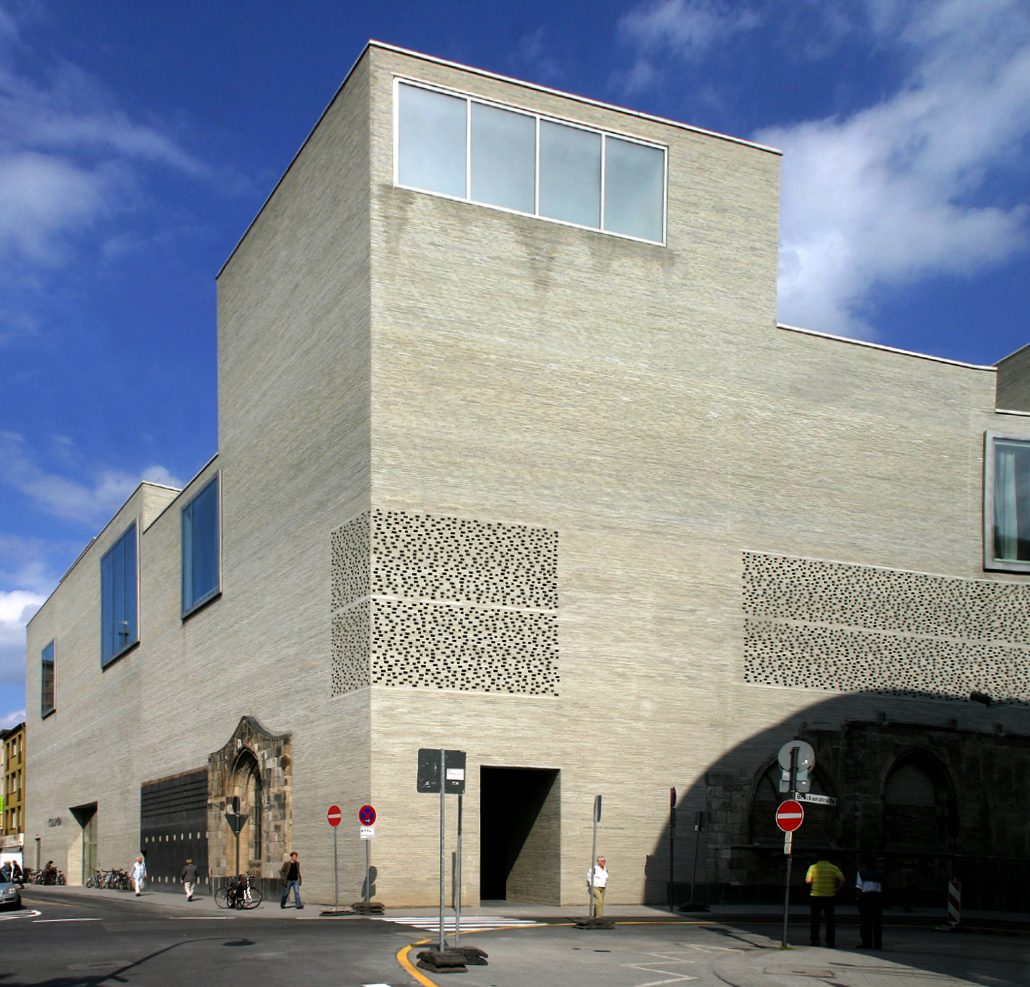
Kolumba Museum

The Kolumba brick was developed in collaboration with Swiss architect Peter Zumthor for the Kolumba Museum in Cologne in 2000. The long, slender brick is produced in 30 colours and has been sold to more than 30 countries and accounted for 15 % of the total It has also been used in the construction of the Royal Danish Playhouse in Copenhagen.

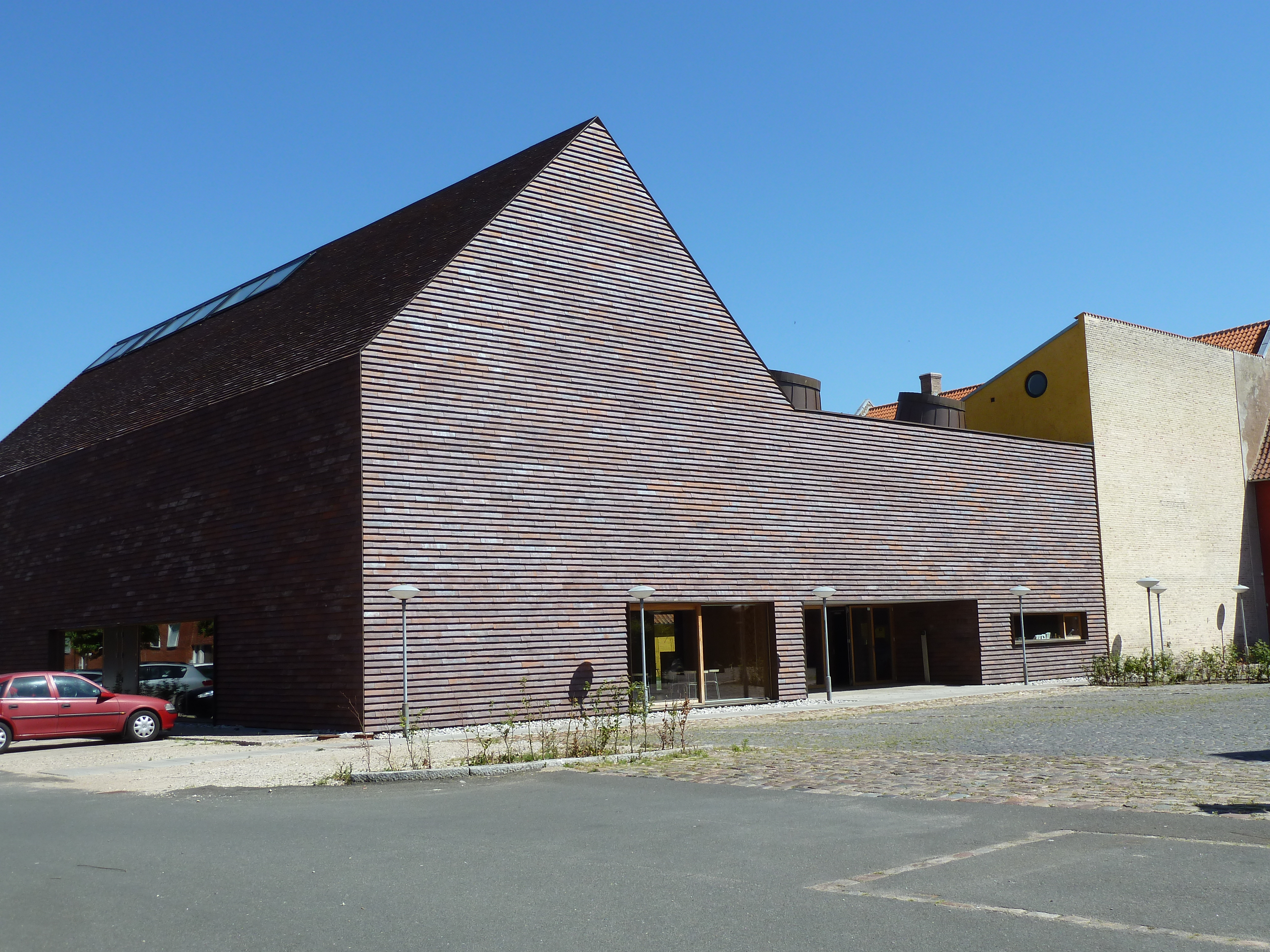
Sorø Art Museum

Petersen Cover is a shingle-like brick product used both as facade and roof cladding. It handmade in wooden moulds and Different combinations of English and German clay are used for the brick. It is produced in two sizes: 528 mm x 170 mm x 37 mm and the wider 528 mm x 240 mm x 37 mm. Petersen cover has for instance been used by Lundgaard / Tranberg for Sorø Art Museum in Sorø] and Kannikegården in Ribe.
