= Ingerslevs Boulevard =

Street in Aarhus, Denmark

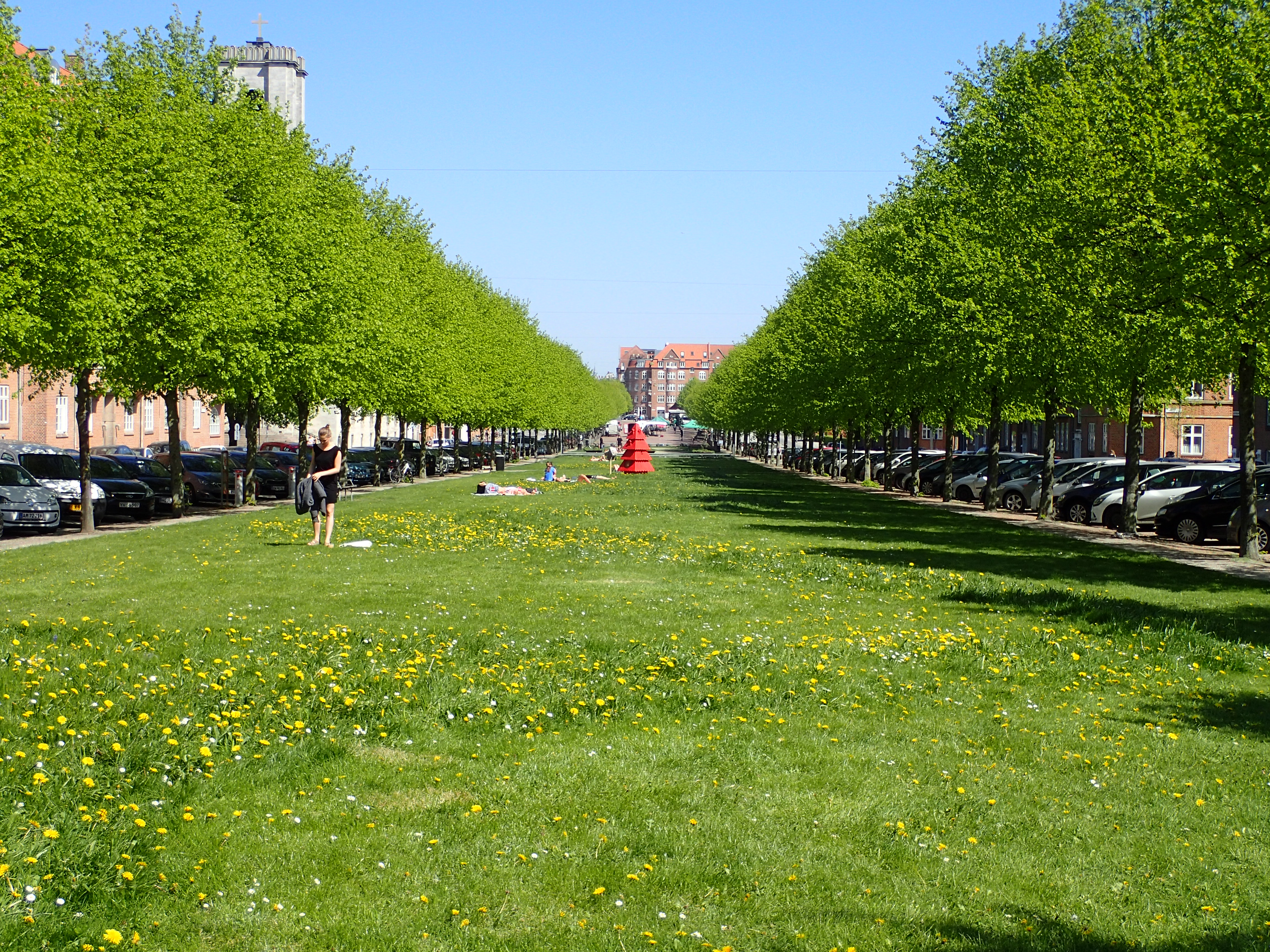
- Ingerslevs Boulevard in Aarhus
- Length: 500 m (1,600 ft)
- Location: Frederiksbjerg, Aarhus, Denmark
- Postal code: 8000
- Coordinates: 56°08′40.5″N 10°11′41.9″E

Ingerslevs Boulevard is a street in Aarhus, Denmark. It is 500 meters long and runs west to east from Harald Jensen's Plads to Skt. Anna Gade. The street is situated in the Frederiksbjerg neighborhood where it is functionally the main street but parts of it also acts as a public green space owing to width and central lawn. Ingerslevs Boulevard is home to St. Luke's Church and two schools, N.J. Fjordgade's School and Frederiksbjerg School. It is a mostly residential area but the street itself hosts a farmer's markets twice a week. Ingerslevs Boulevard was developed in the early 20th century as a main component of Frederiksbjerg when the neighborhood was created based on a unified urban planning design.

== History ==
Ingerslevs Boulevard was named in 1899 and developed between 1899 and 1912. The boulevard is named for Hans Peter Ingerslev (1821-1896) who owned Marselisborg Manor until it was bought by Aarhus Municipality in 1896. The boulevard was a part of urban planning designs by city engineer Charles Ambt and architect Hack Kampmann who originally envisioned the boulevard extend all the way from St. Luke's Church square to Hans Broge's Street. The city council proved skeptical of the plans due to concerns over the amount of land needed. The eastern section of the boulevard was narrowed and instead became the present Odensegade. Ambt and Kampmann's original idea had been a wide boulevard flanked by prominent buildings on either side with a public, monumental building capping the street at the west end so Ingerslevs Boulevard would function as a point-de-vue. In 1912 Aarhus city council enacted changes to the original plans, extending Ingerslevs Boulevard to de Mezas Vej while the alignment of Horsensgade and Vejlegade along with the area by St. Luke's Church was determined.

== Architecture ==
The buildings at the east end of the boulevard, on the north side, consists of the new Frederiksbjerg School and between Kroghsgade and Lundingsgades one block of 4½ story picturesque buildings with bay windows and towers in the corners. On the south side are N.J. Fjordsgade School and Ingerslevs Boulevard School. Along the western end of the boulevard, on the south side, are 3 city blocks built between 1928 and 1930 which marked the end of revivalism in Aarhus. The north side is characterized by the Neoclassical St. Luke's Church and a Neo-baroque city block by Axel Høeg-Hansen.

The boulevard is defined by two rows of elm trees (ulmus hollandica from 1913) planted along the wide midsection.

== Gallery ==
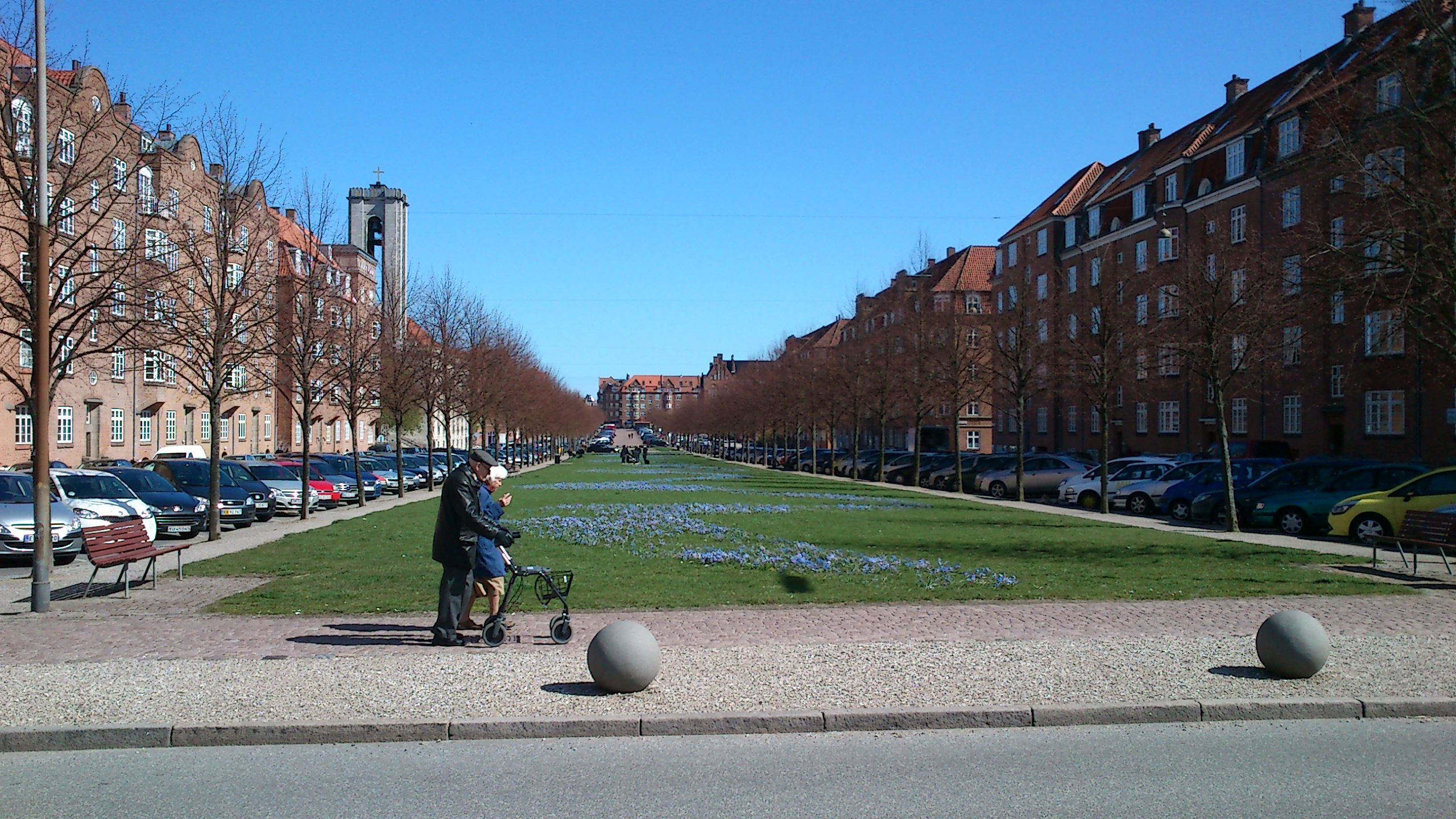
Western end

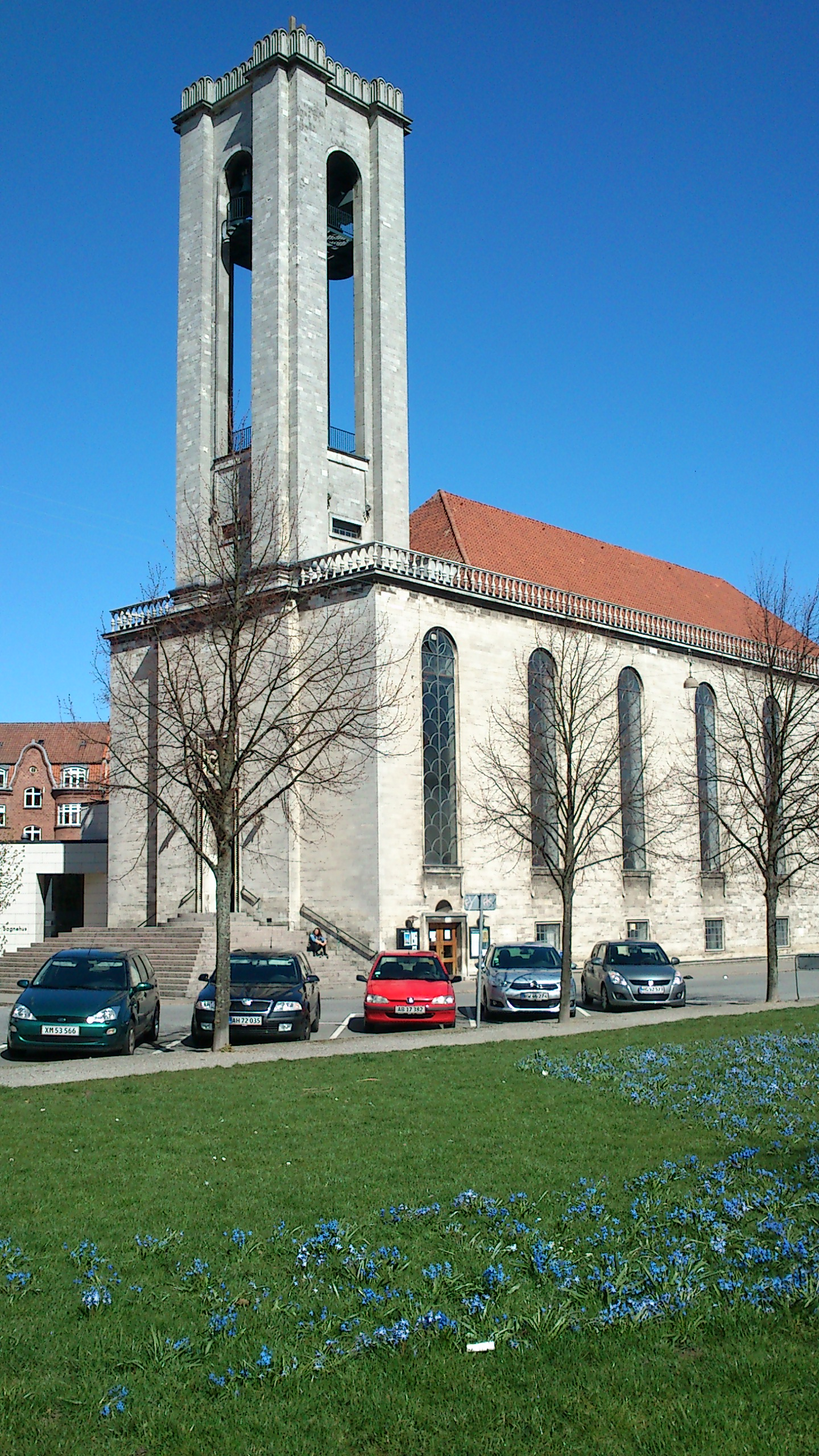
St. Luke's Church

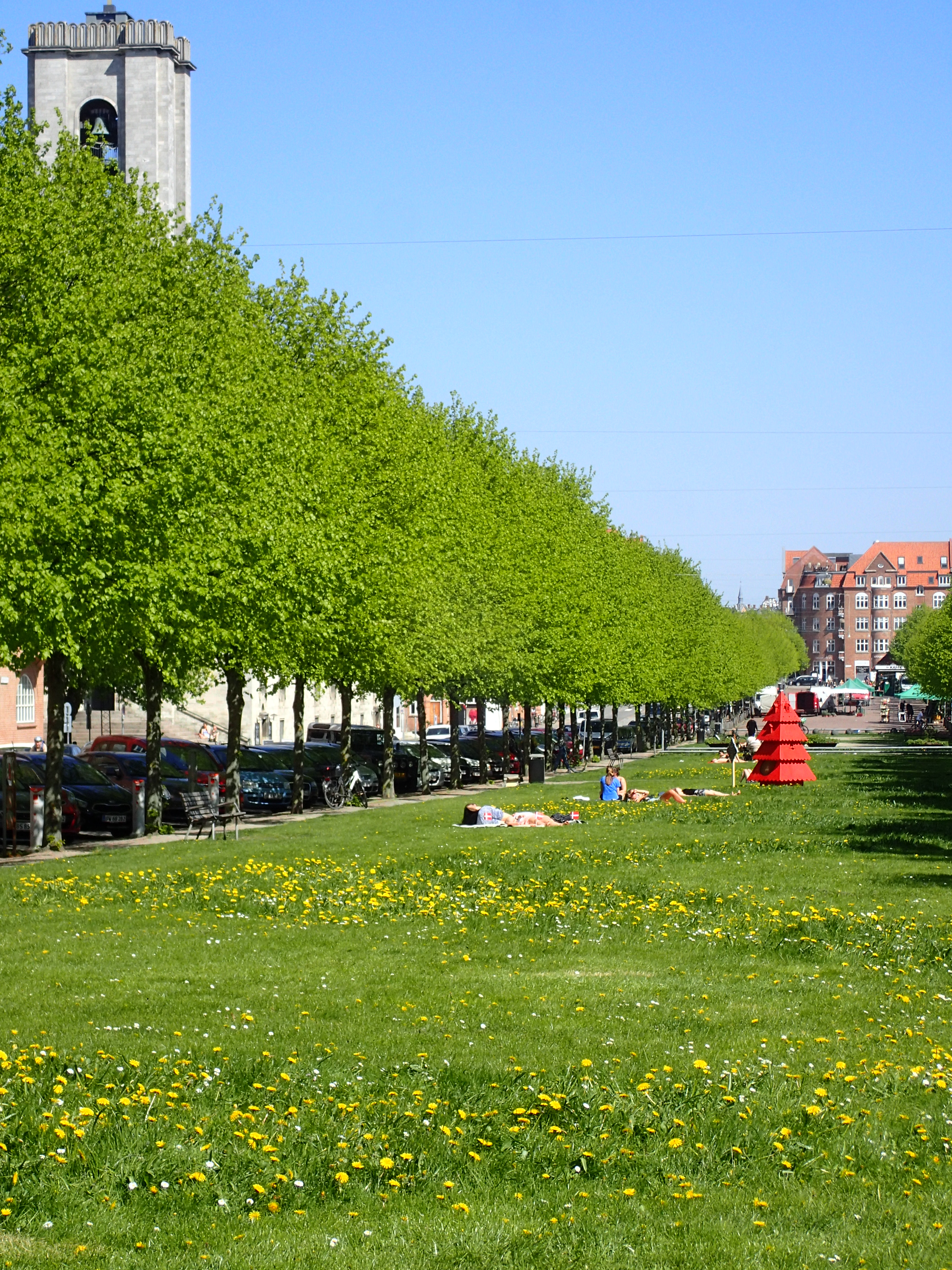
Green area

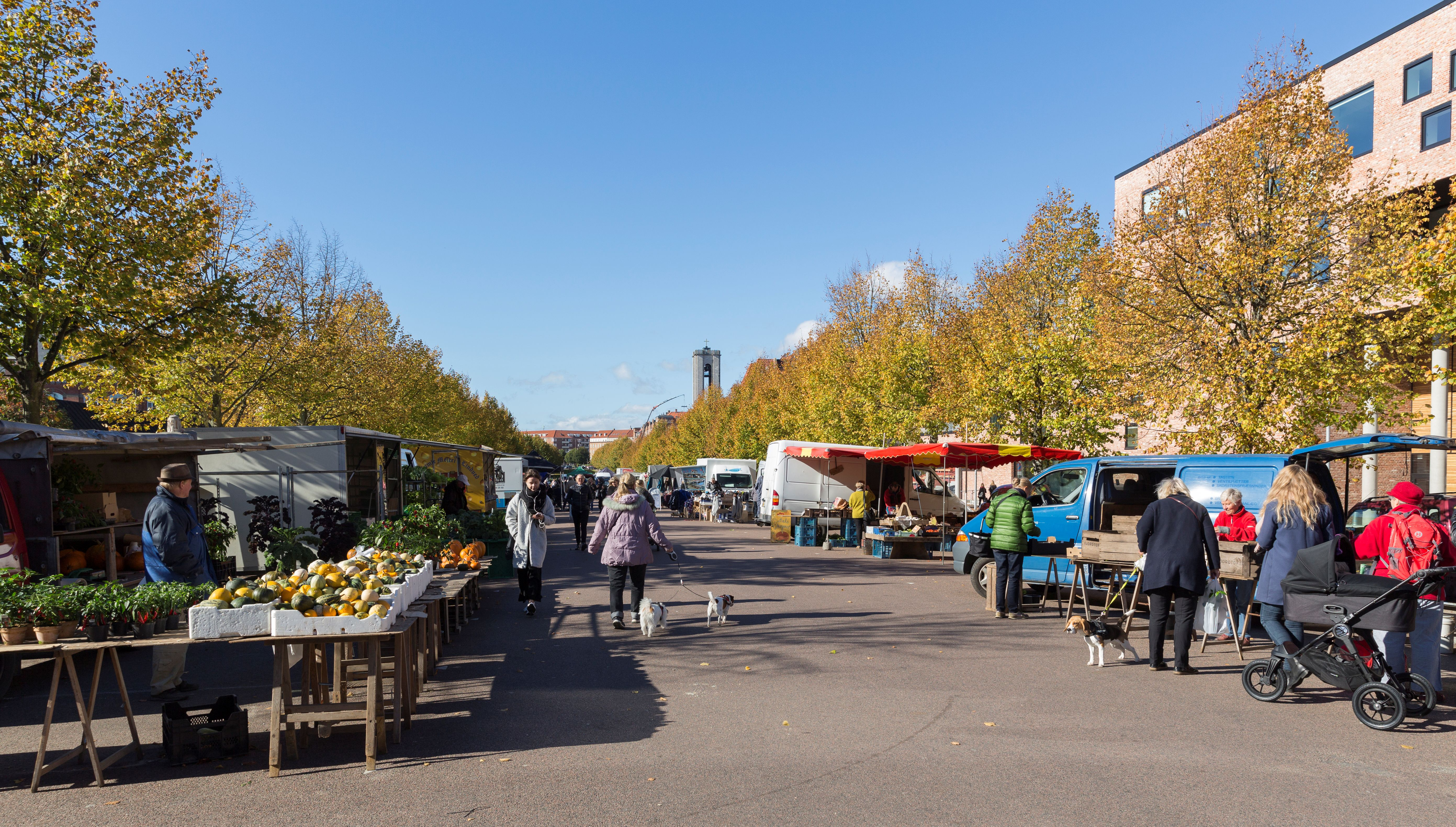
Market day

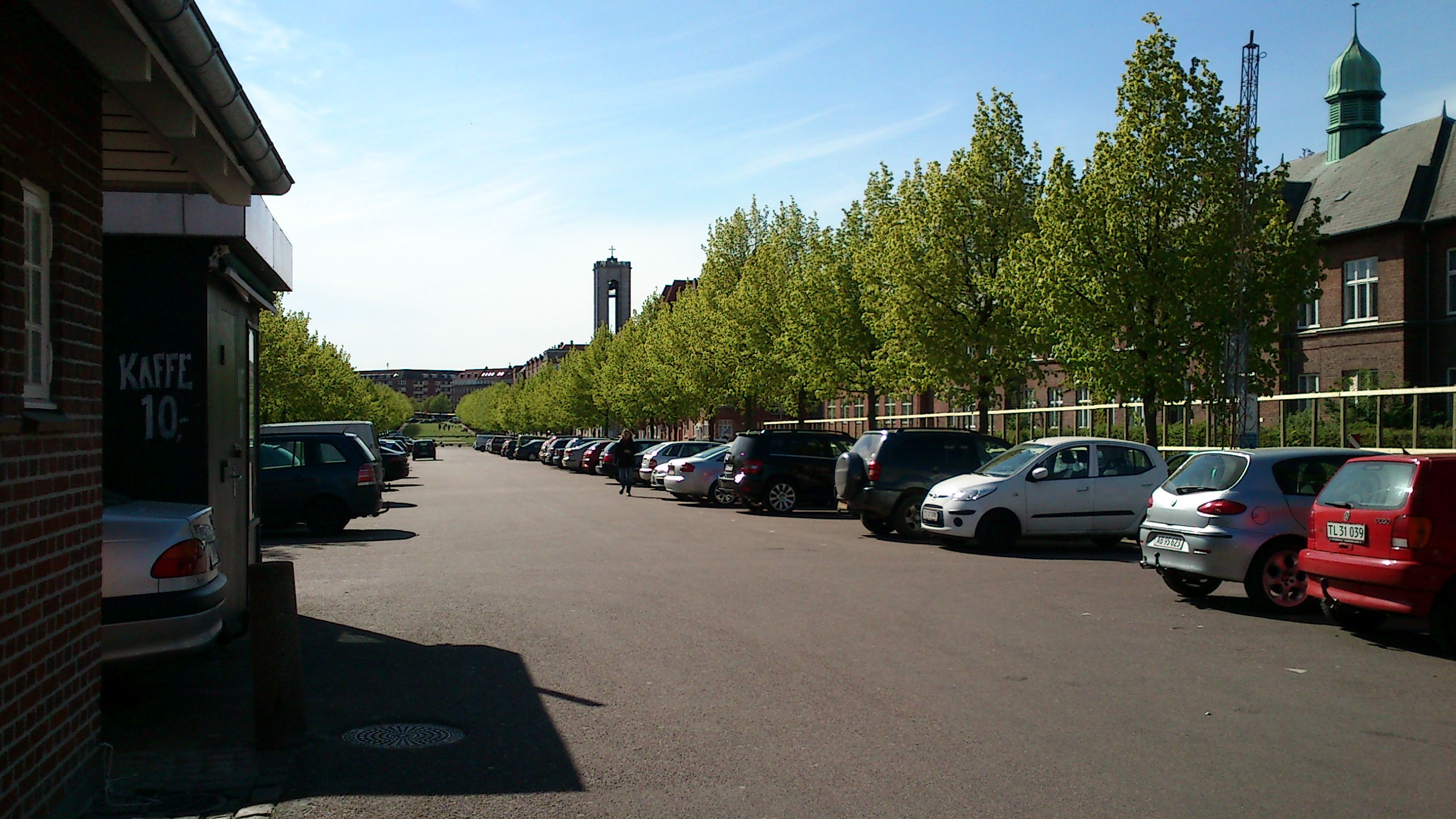
Car park

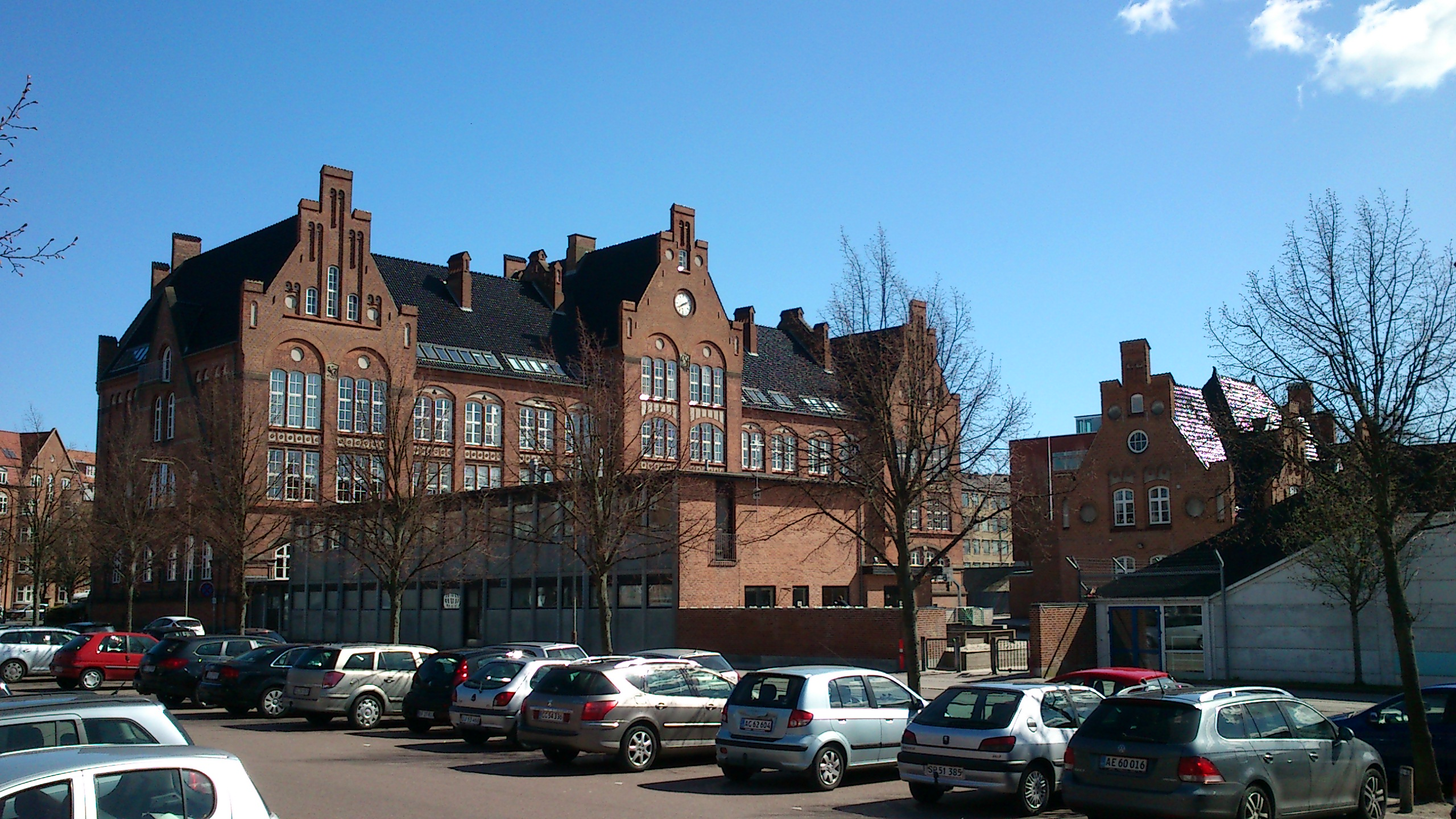
N.J. Fjordsgades School
