= Frederiksbjerg =

- Neighborhood
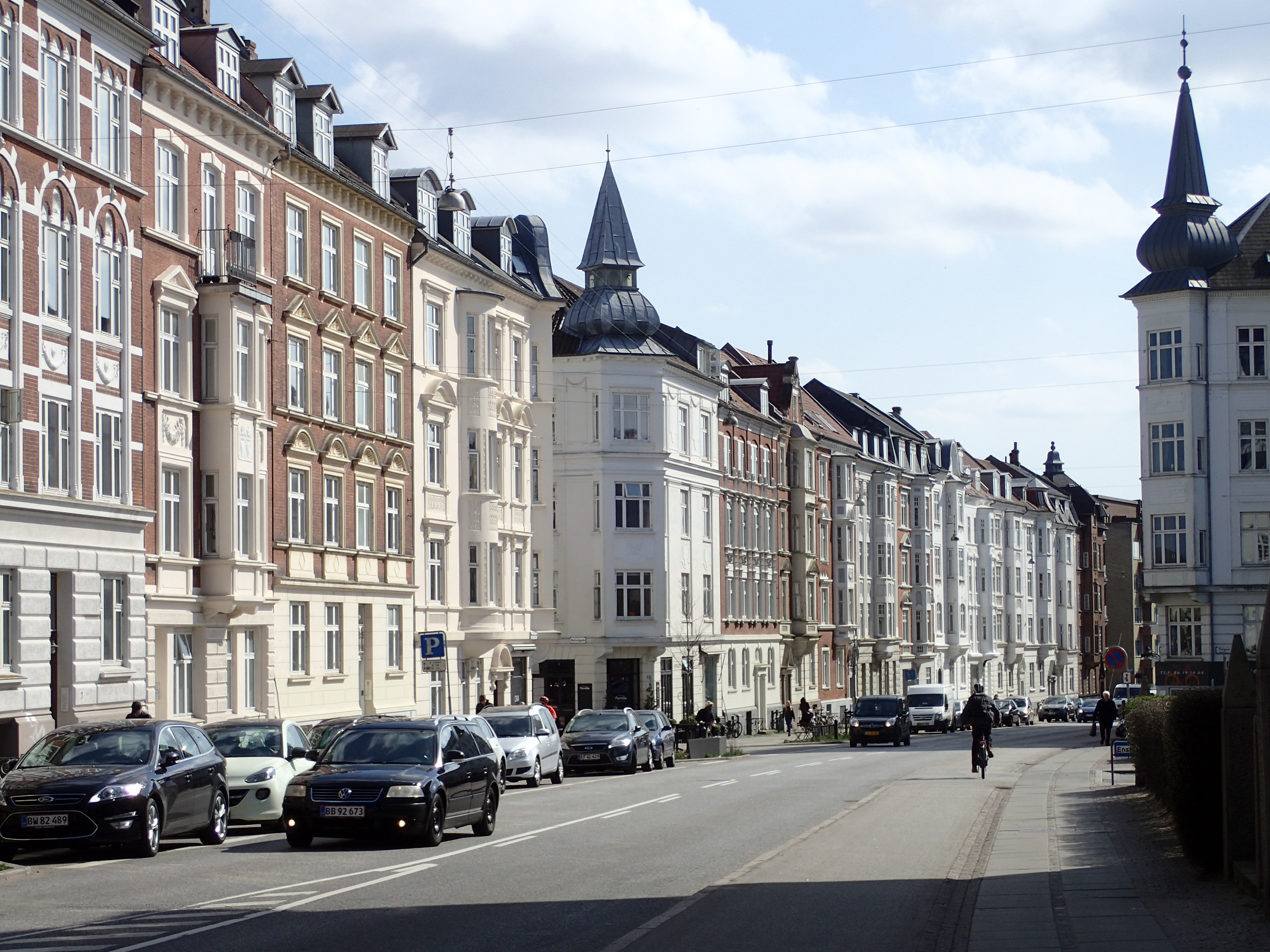
- Hans Broges Gade

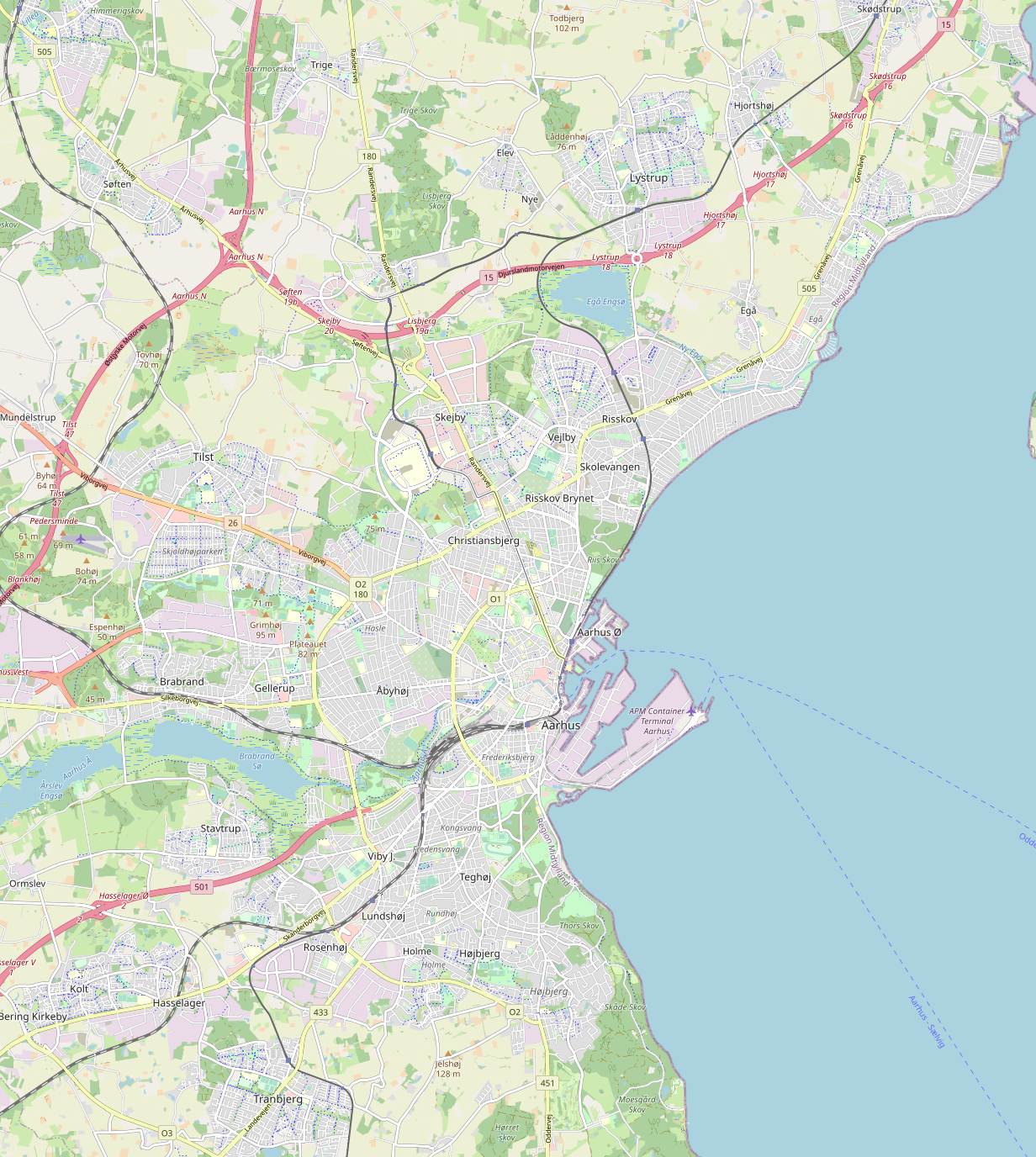
- Location within Aarhus
- Coordinates: 56.147°N 10.201°E
- Country: Denmark
- Regions of Denmark: Central Denmark Region
- Municipality: Aarhus Municipality
- District: Aarhus C
- Postal code: 8000

Frederiksbjerg is a borough in Aarhus, Denmark.

Frederiksbjerg is part of the postal district Aarhus C and is located just south of the historical city centre, separated from it by a broad railway yard and connected by three bridges. Despite being part of the inner city, Frederiksbjerg has its own charm and character and express some of the first large scale attempts to plan the development of Aarhus as a city. With around 20,000 inhabitants, it is basically a residential area, but with three large shopping streets; Bruunsgade, Jægergårdsgade, and Frederiks Allé.

== History ==
Frederiksbjerg was annexed by Aarhus in 1874, when the city limits was moved south from the railway yard. The city was at bursting point for expansion, due to the accelerating industrialization and population growth, and new building sites were desperately needed. From 1870 to 1875 Frederiksbjergs population rose from just 300 to 2,000 citizens and with the building of the new bridge of Bruuns Bro, the admission accelerated further. This development inspired the City Council to adopt a strategy of large scale city planning, something hitherto unheard of in Aarhus and Denmark in general. Several plans was proposed and worked out, but the architect Hack Kampmann and city engineer to Copenhagen Charles Ambt's innovative plan from 1898, ended up as the most influential. Frederiksbjerg was soon fully developed and populated thereafter.

== Gallery ==
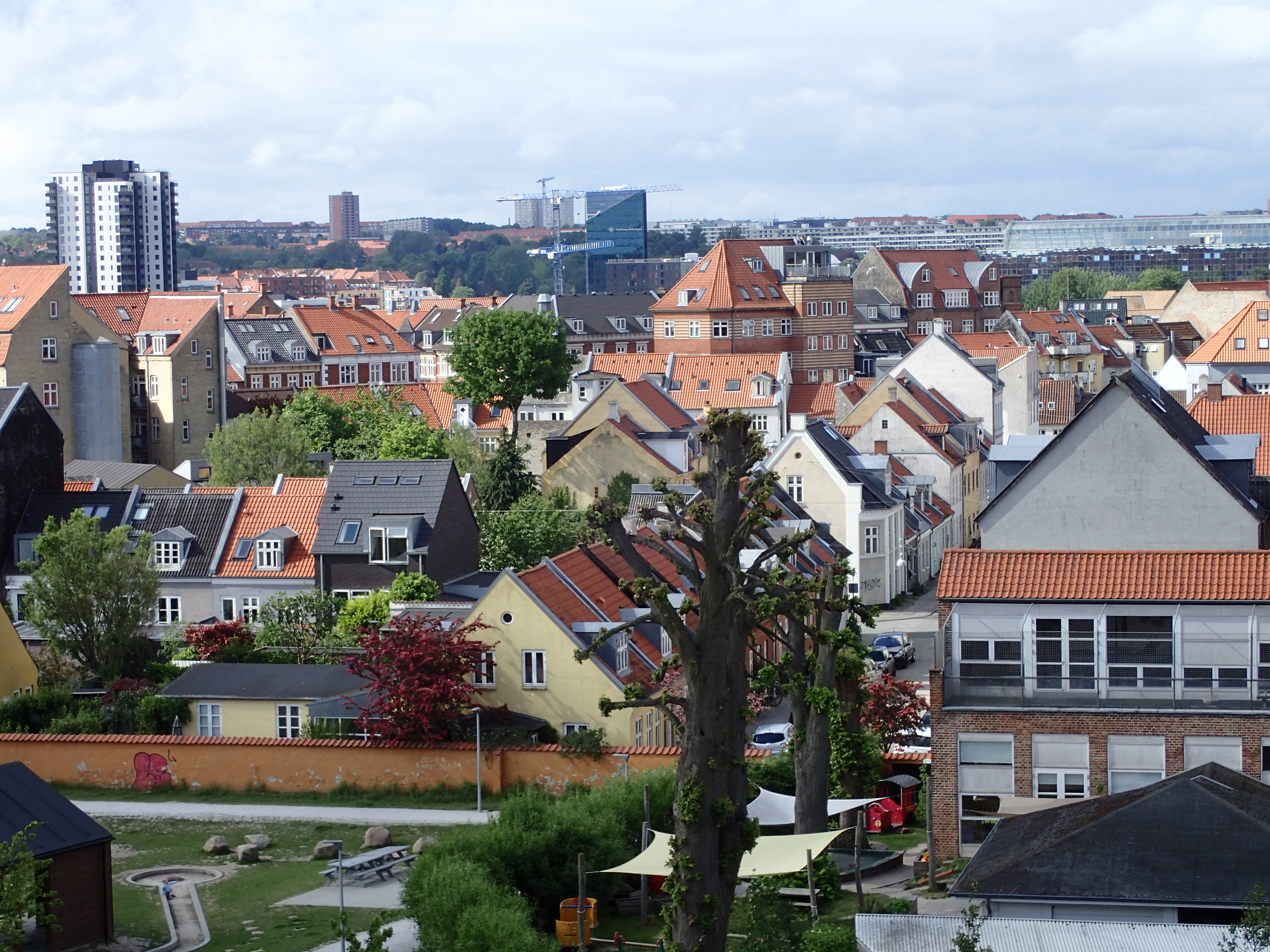
Skyline

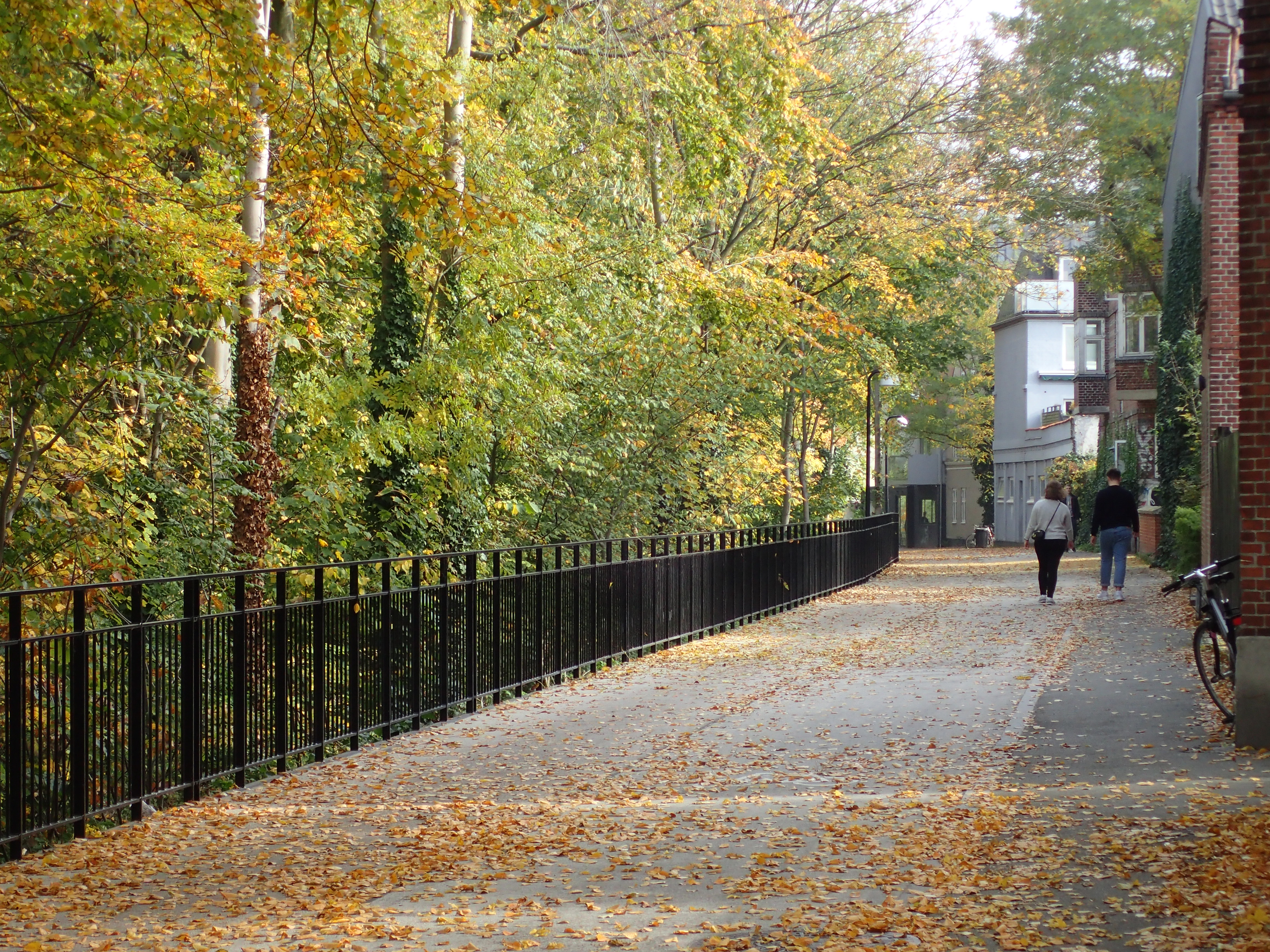
Hallssti. This shared bikeway marks the northern limits of Frederiksbjerg

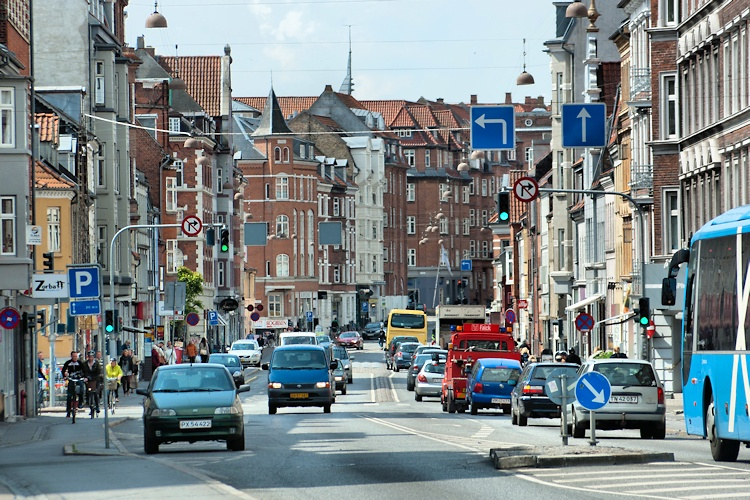
Frederiks Allé, an important and heavily trafficked transport street.

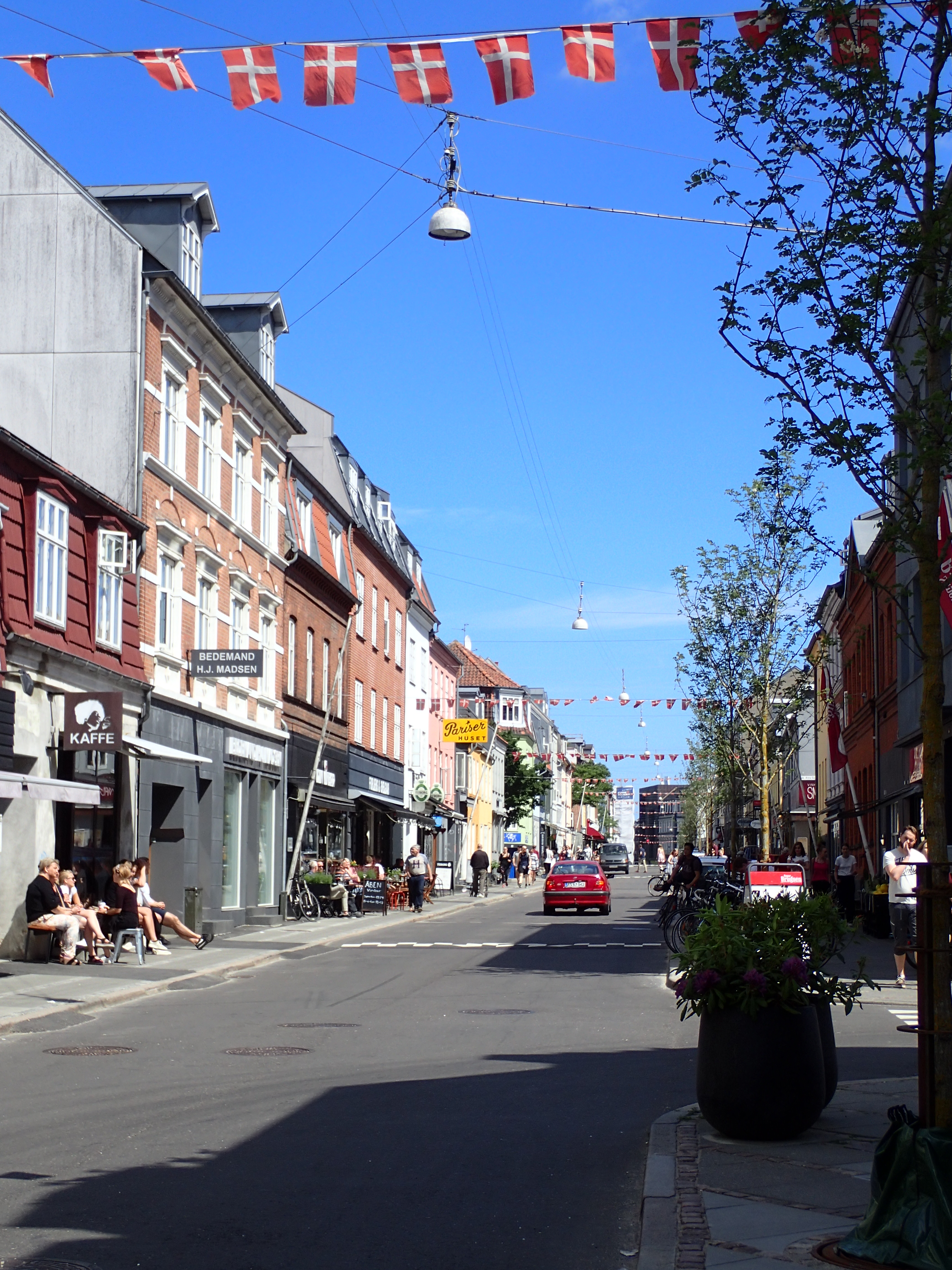
Jægergårdsgade, main shopping street

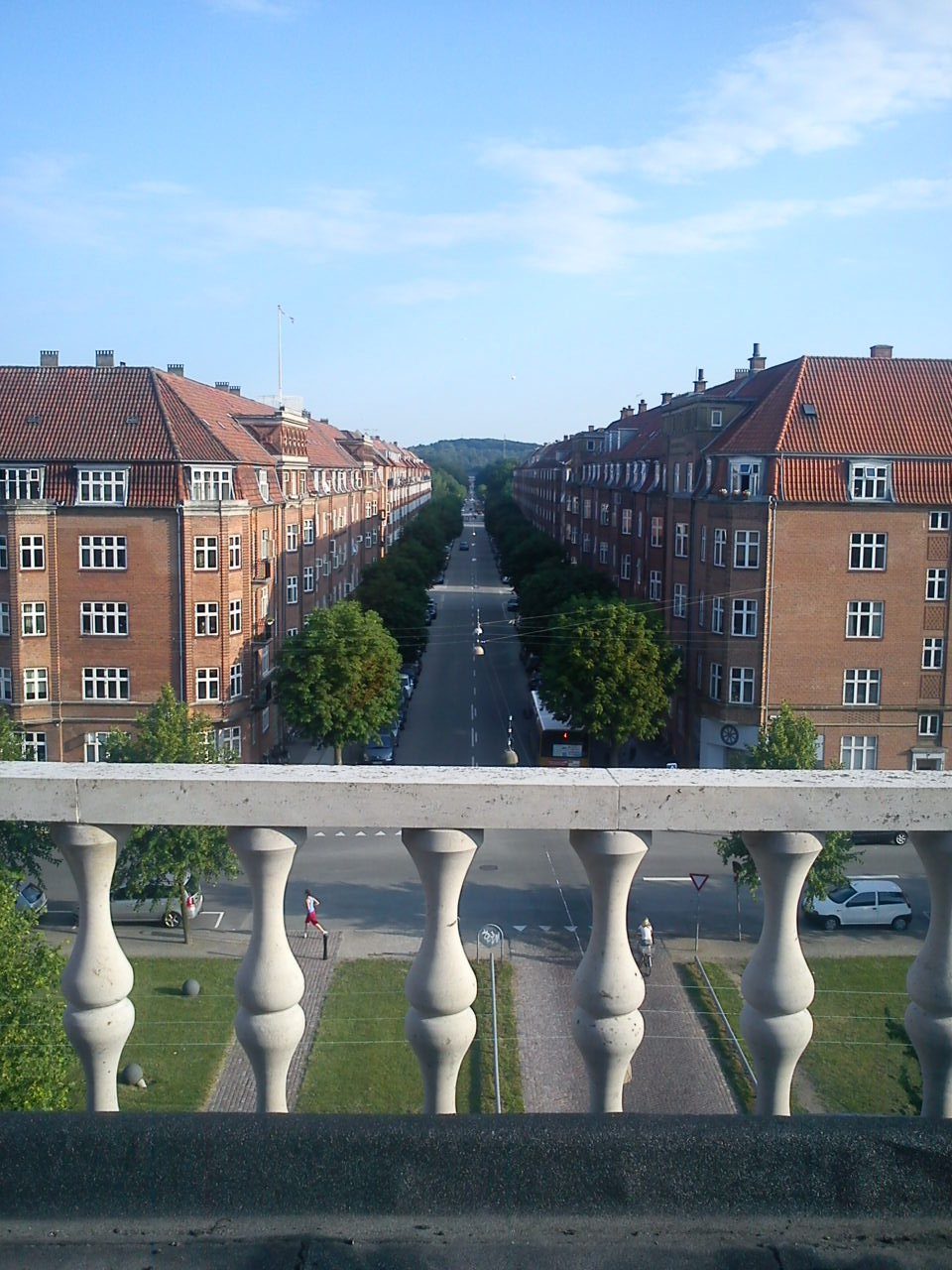
The long avenue of Stadion Allé

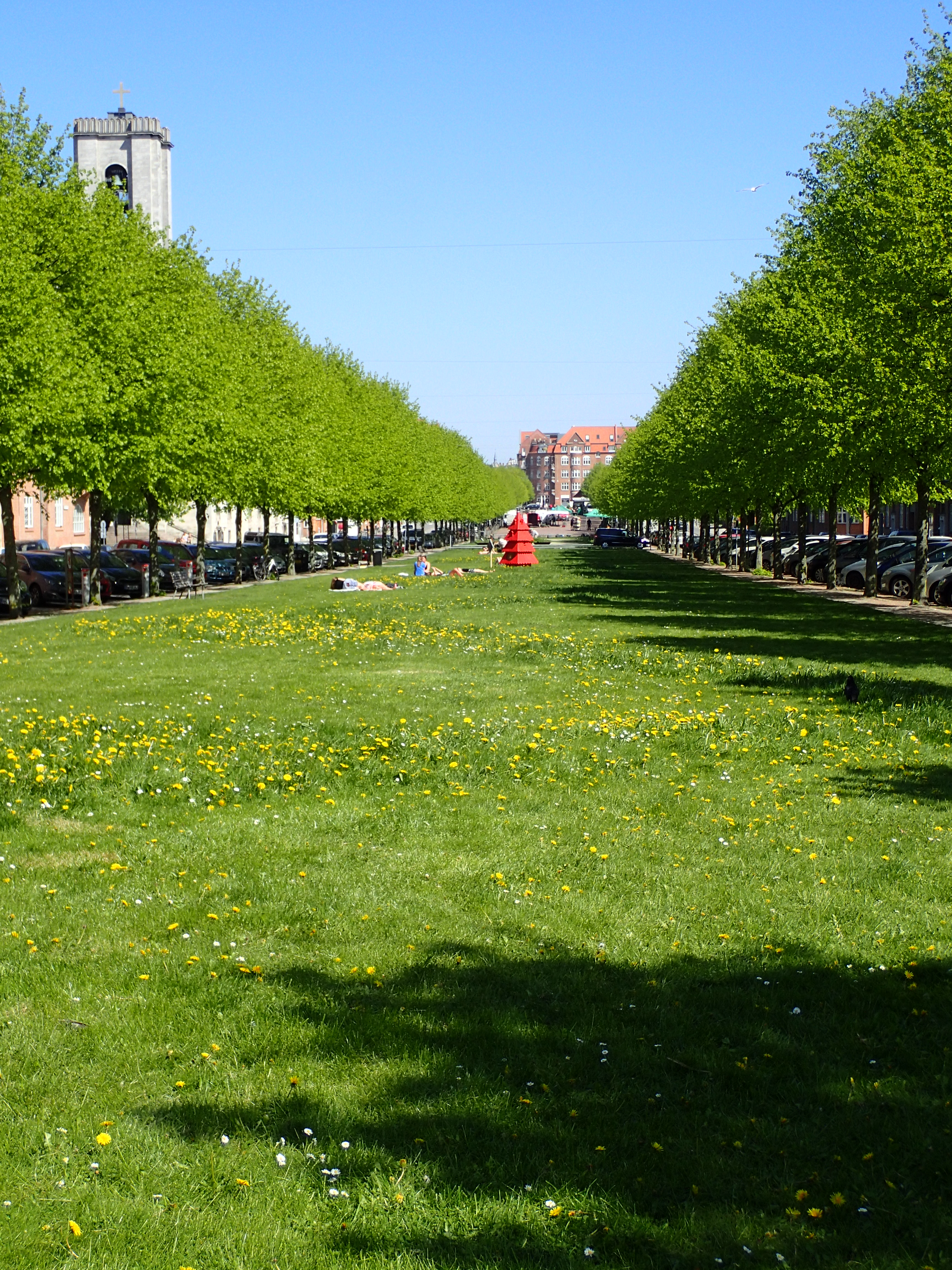
Ingerslevs Boulevard, main street and park area

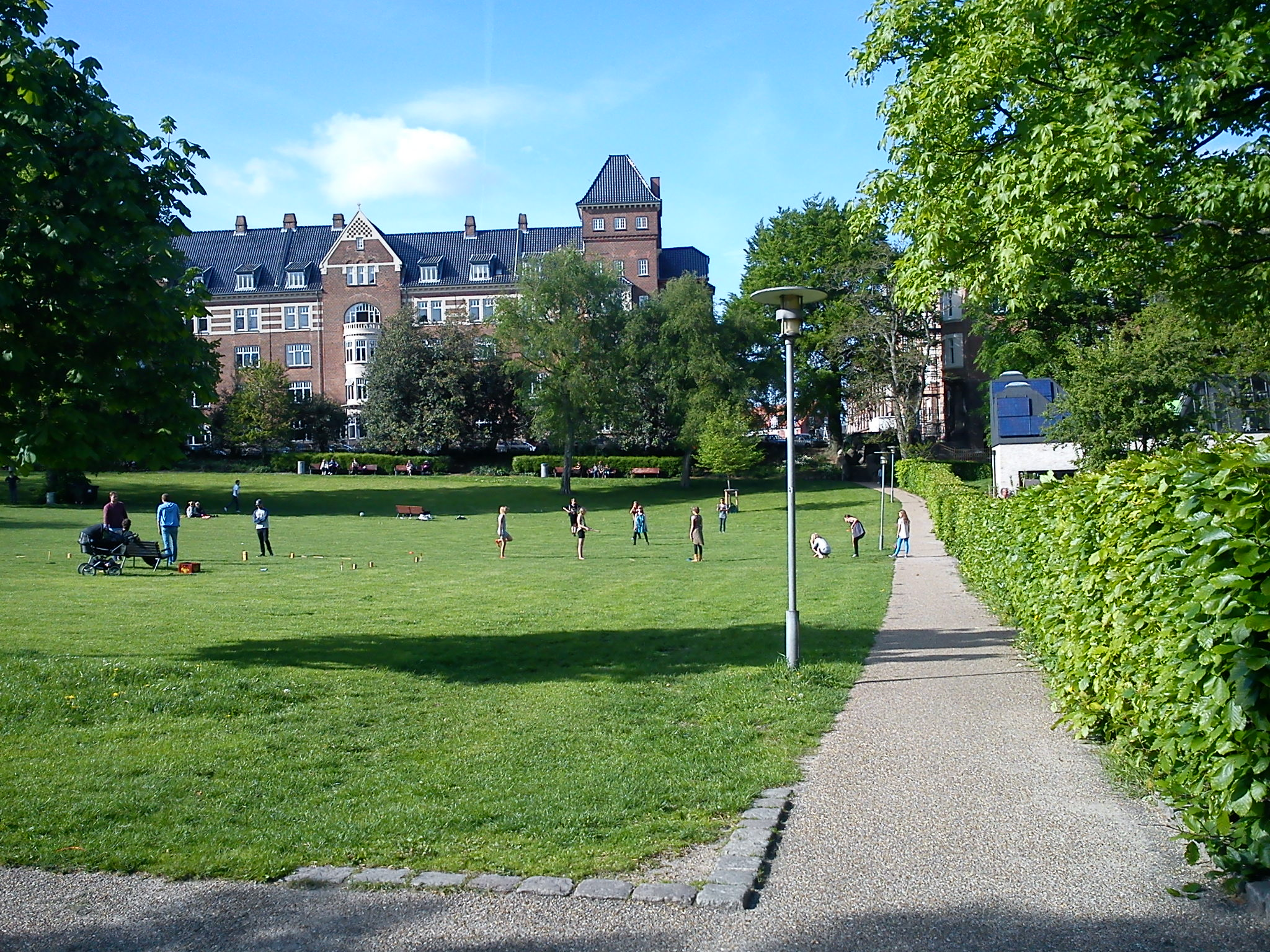
Skanseparken, a recreational park in the eastern parts

Institutions

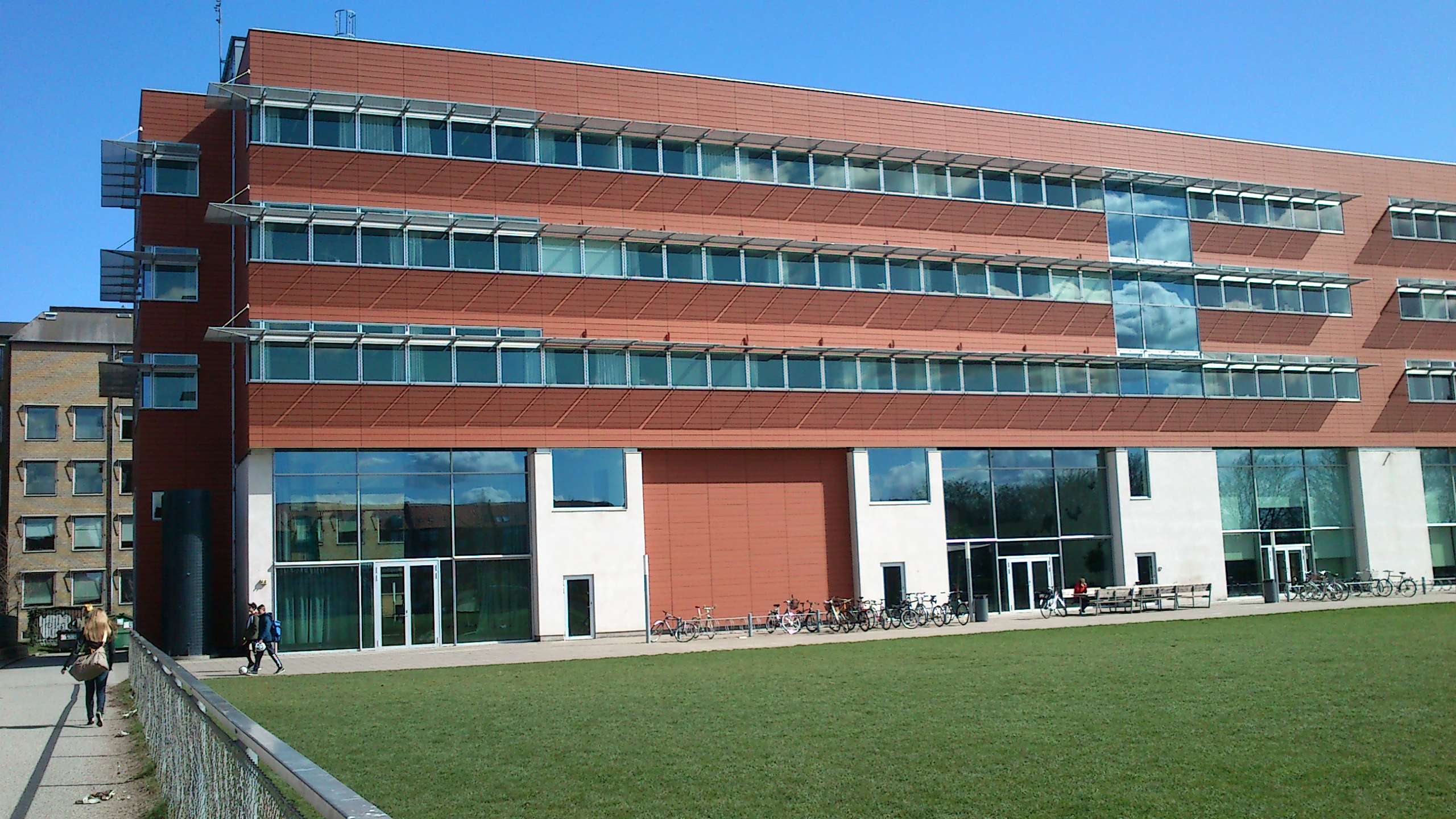
Institute for Sports, under Aarhus University.

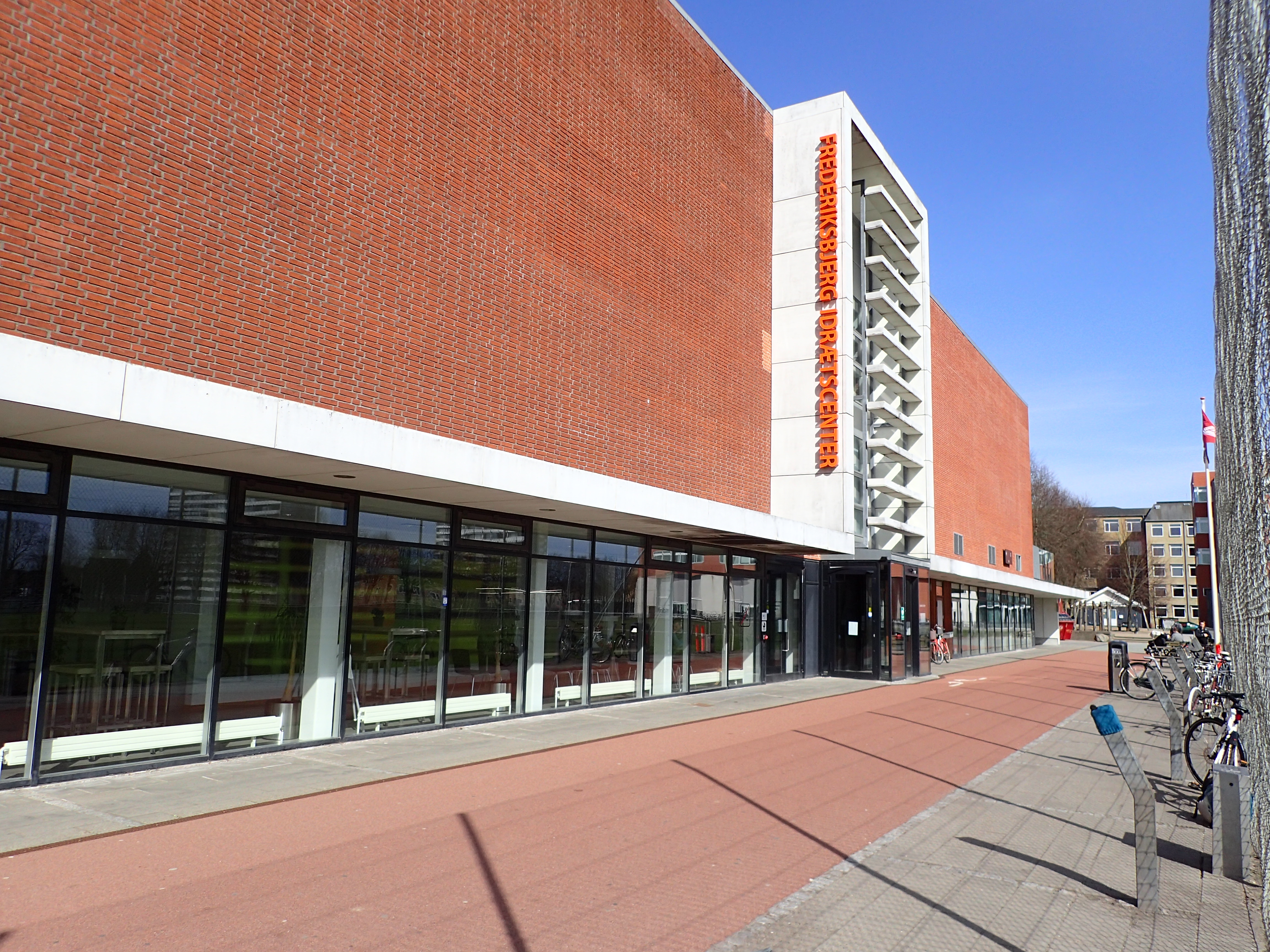
Frederiksbjerg Idrætscenter, a sports center and swimminghall

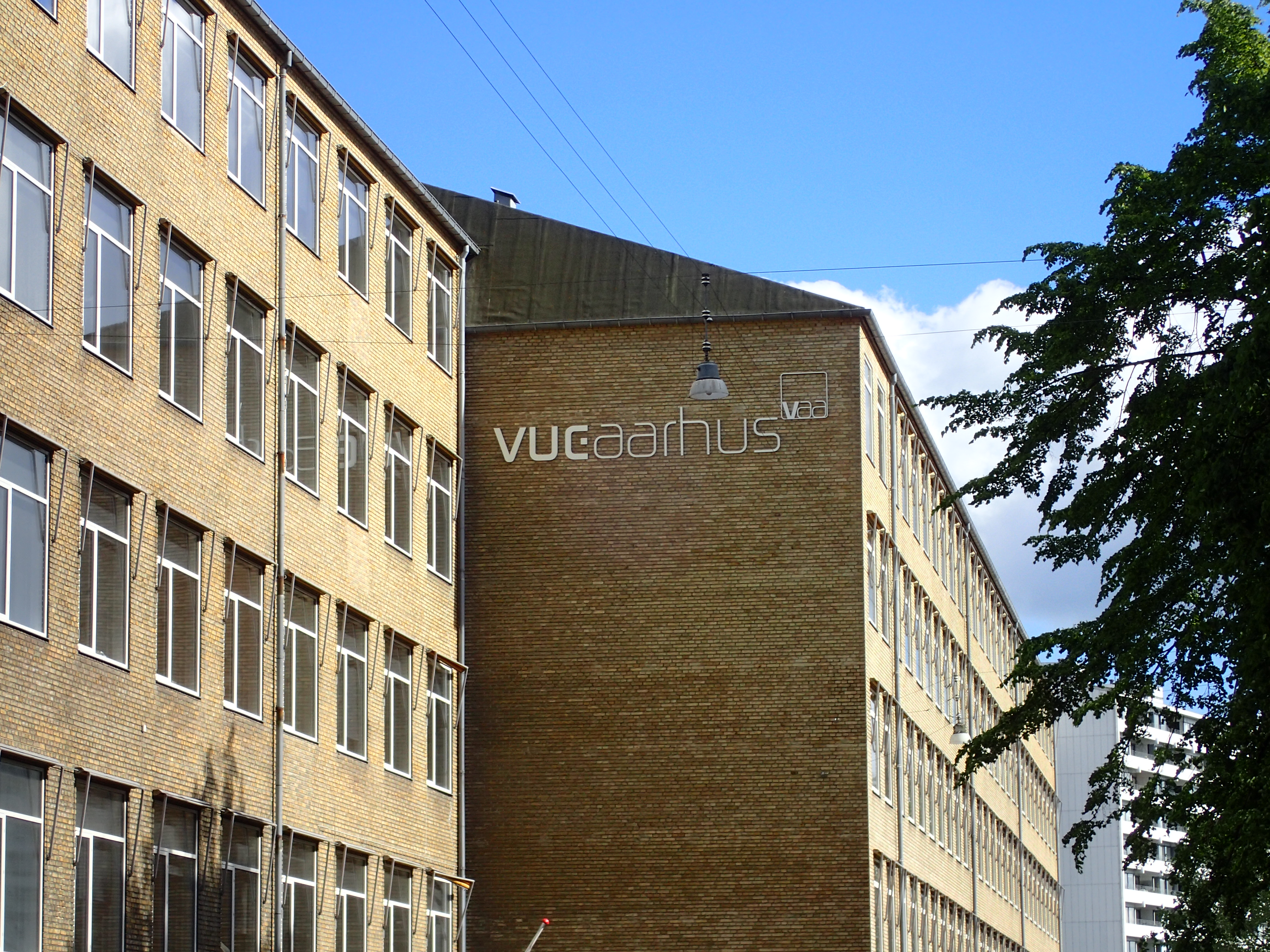
VUC Aarhus

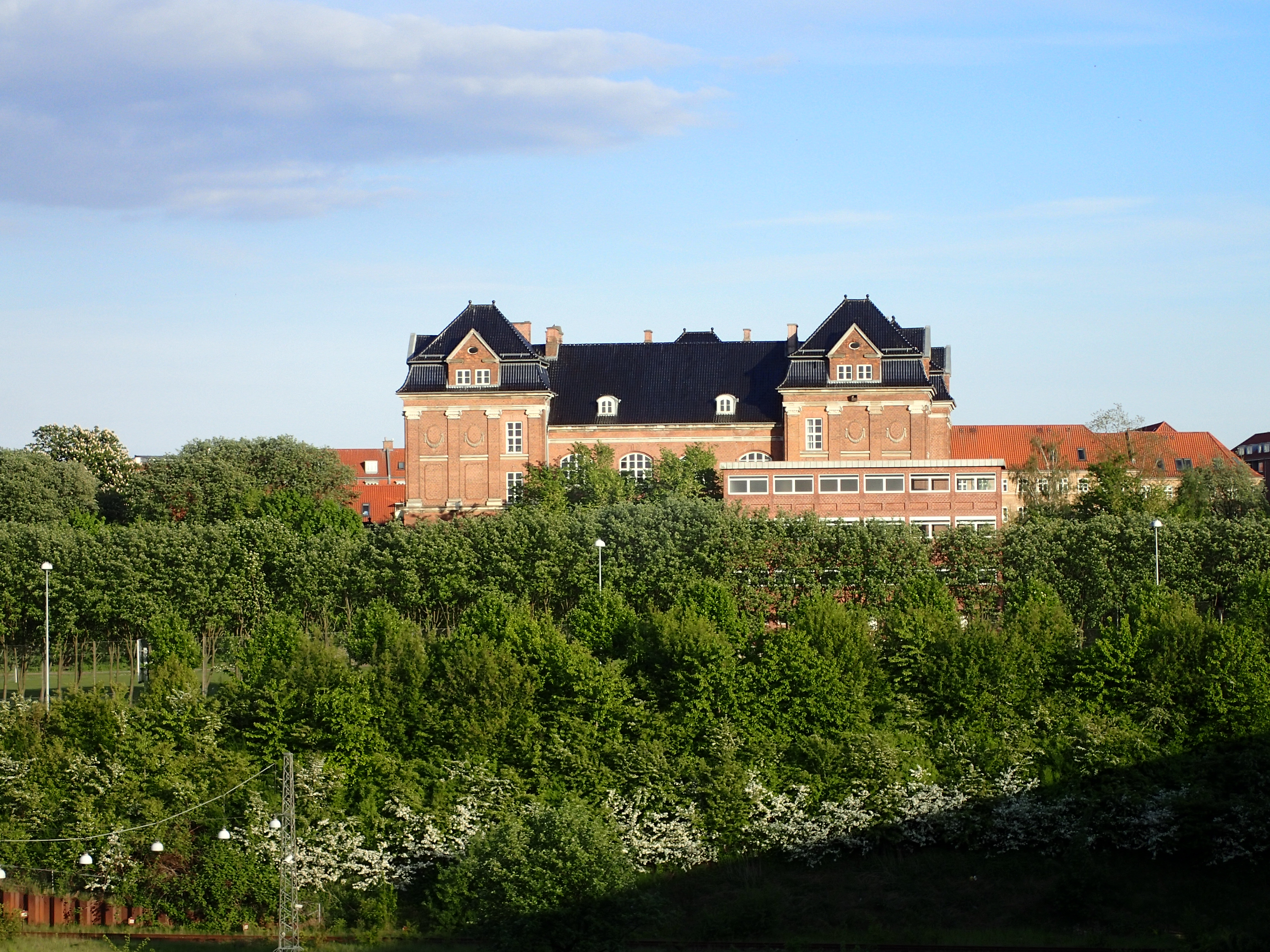
Public school of Læssøesgades Skole

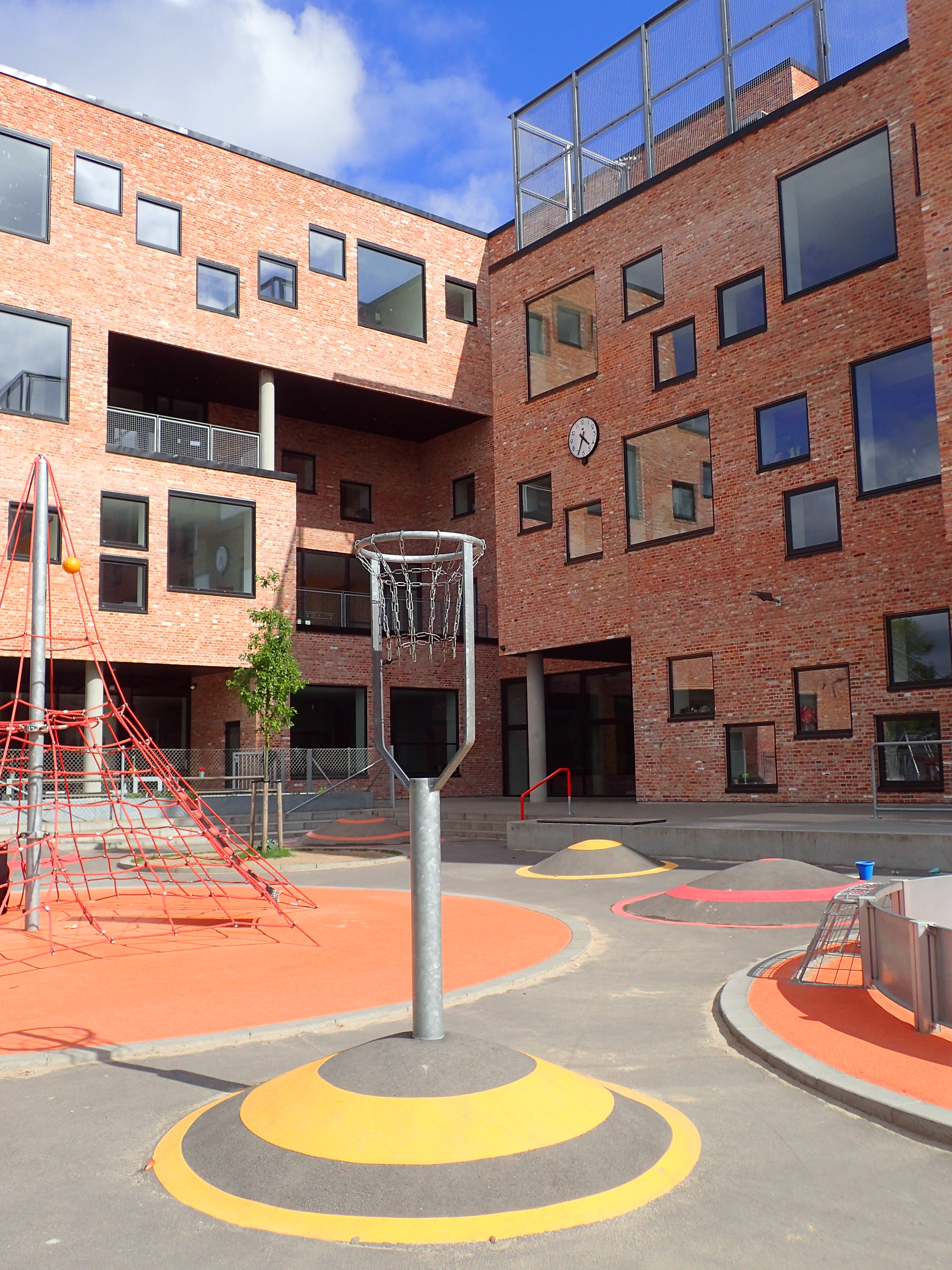
Public school of Frederiksbjerg Skole from 2016

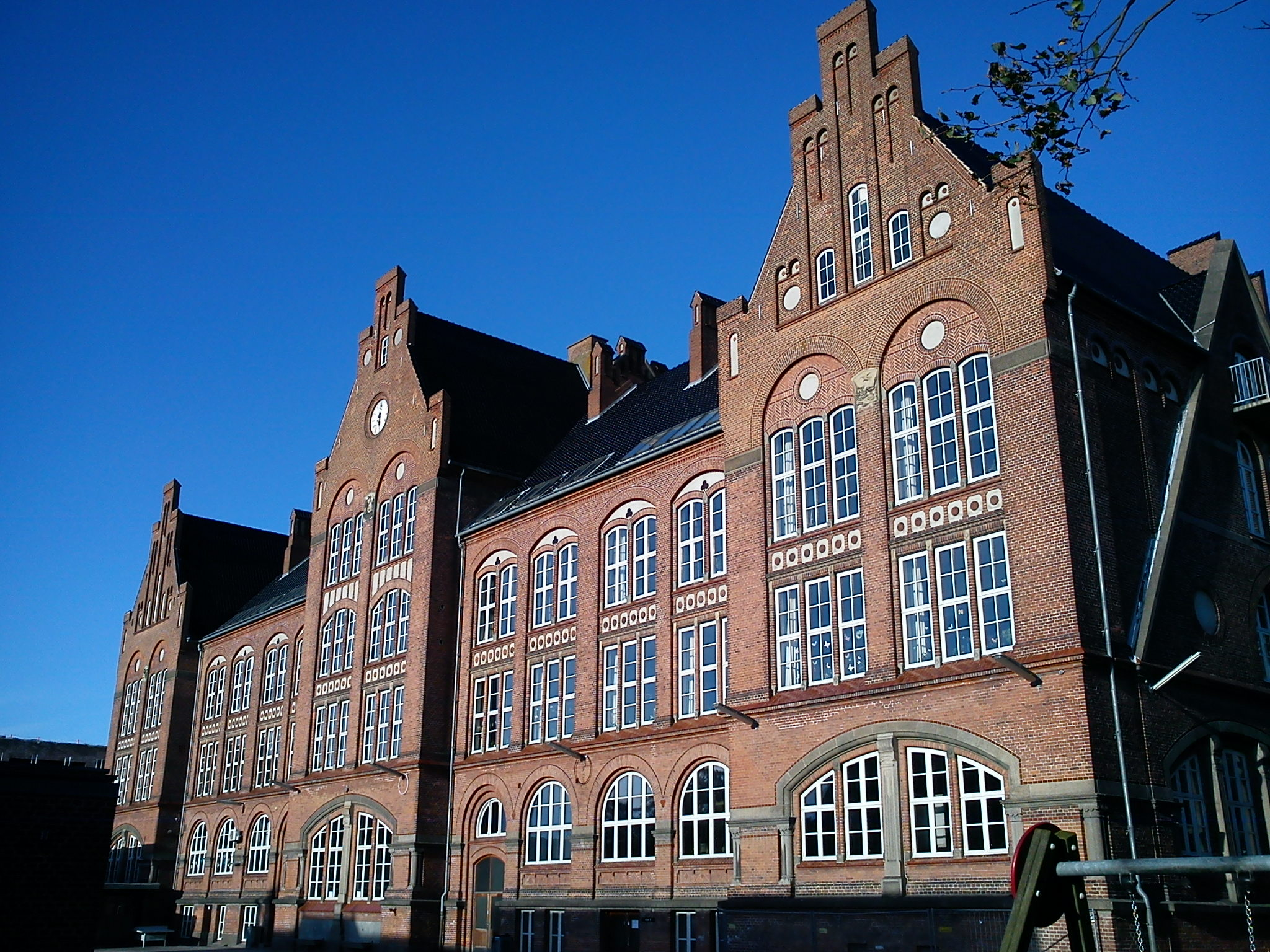
Fjordsgade, a public center for sports and non-profit associations

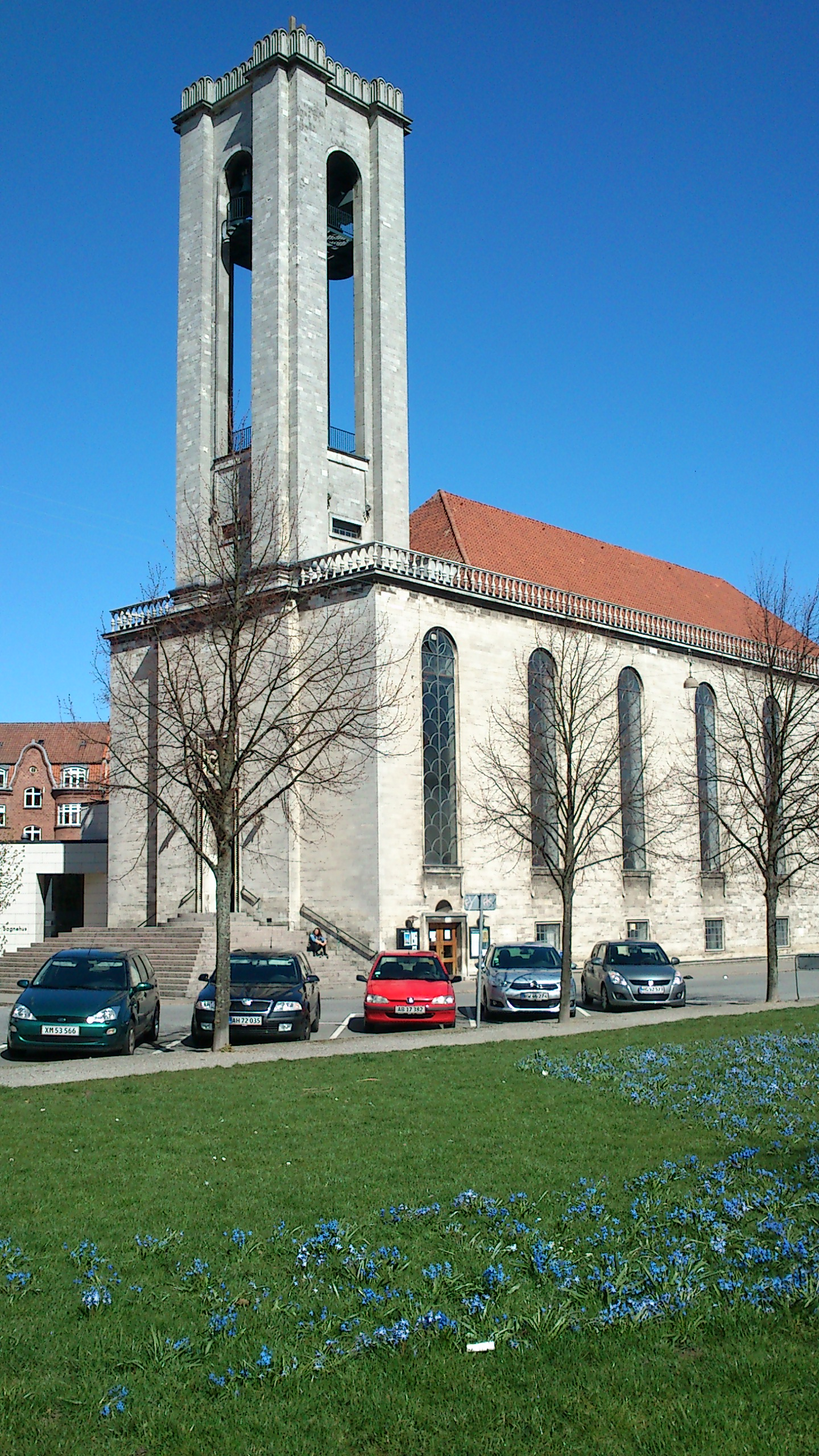
The church of Lukas Kirken.

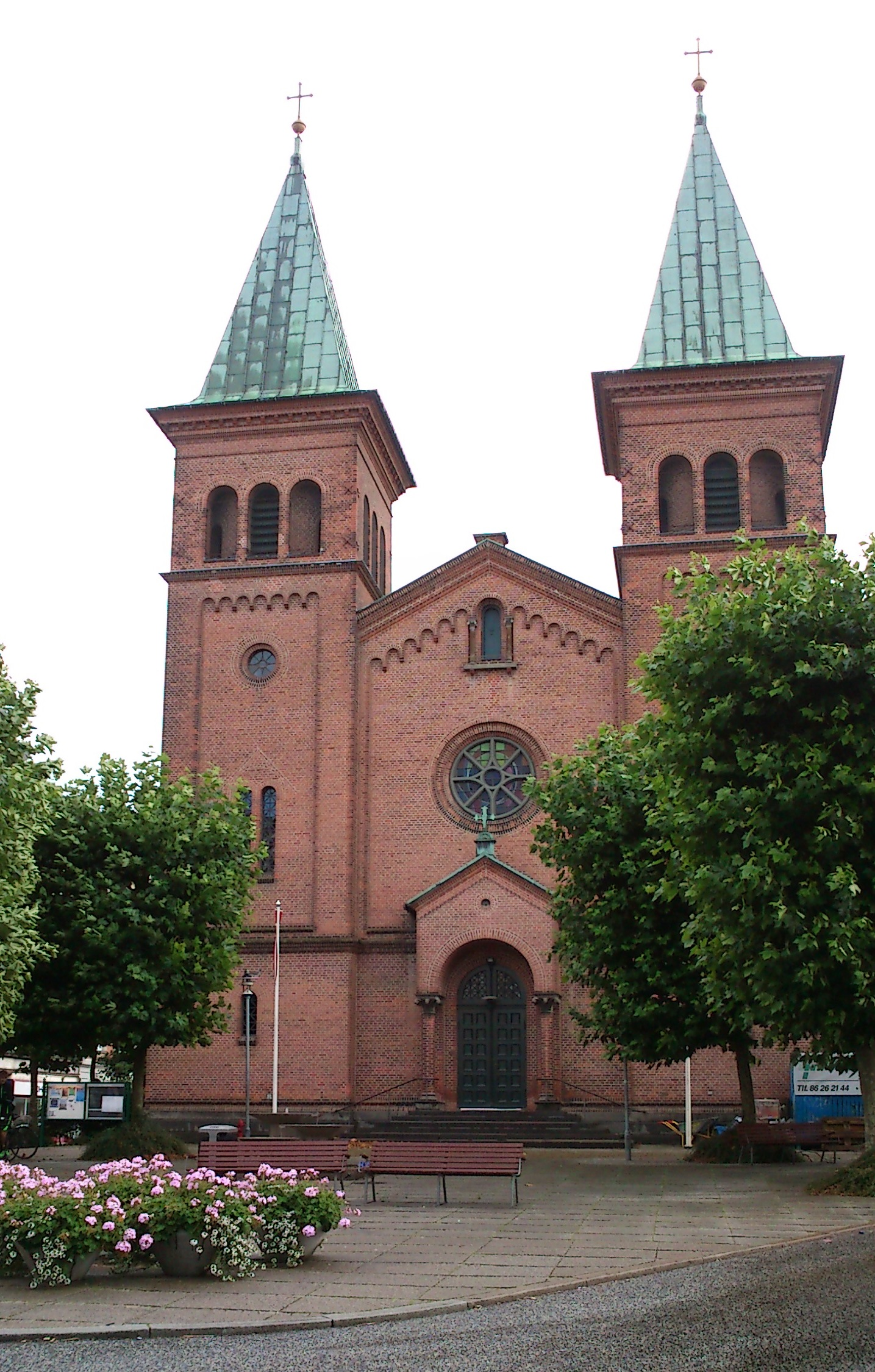
Paulskirken

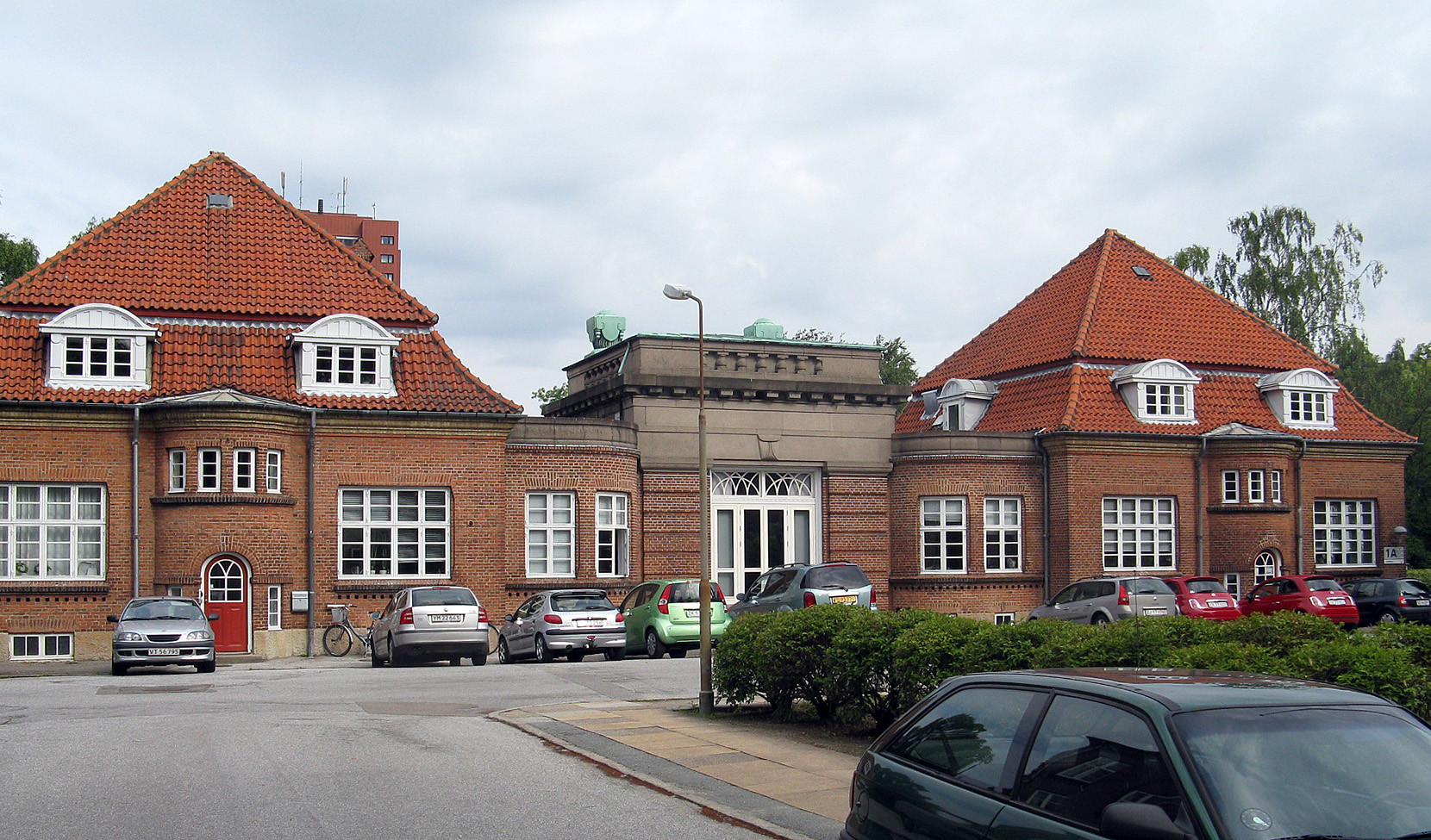
Marselisborg Hospital

Architecture

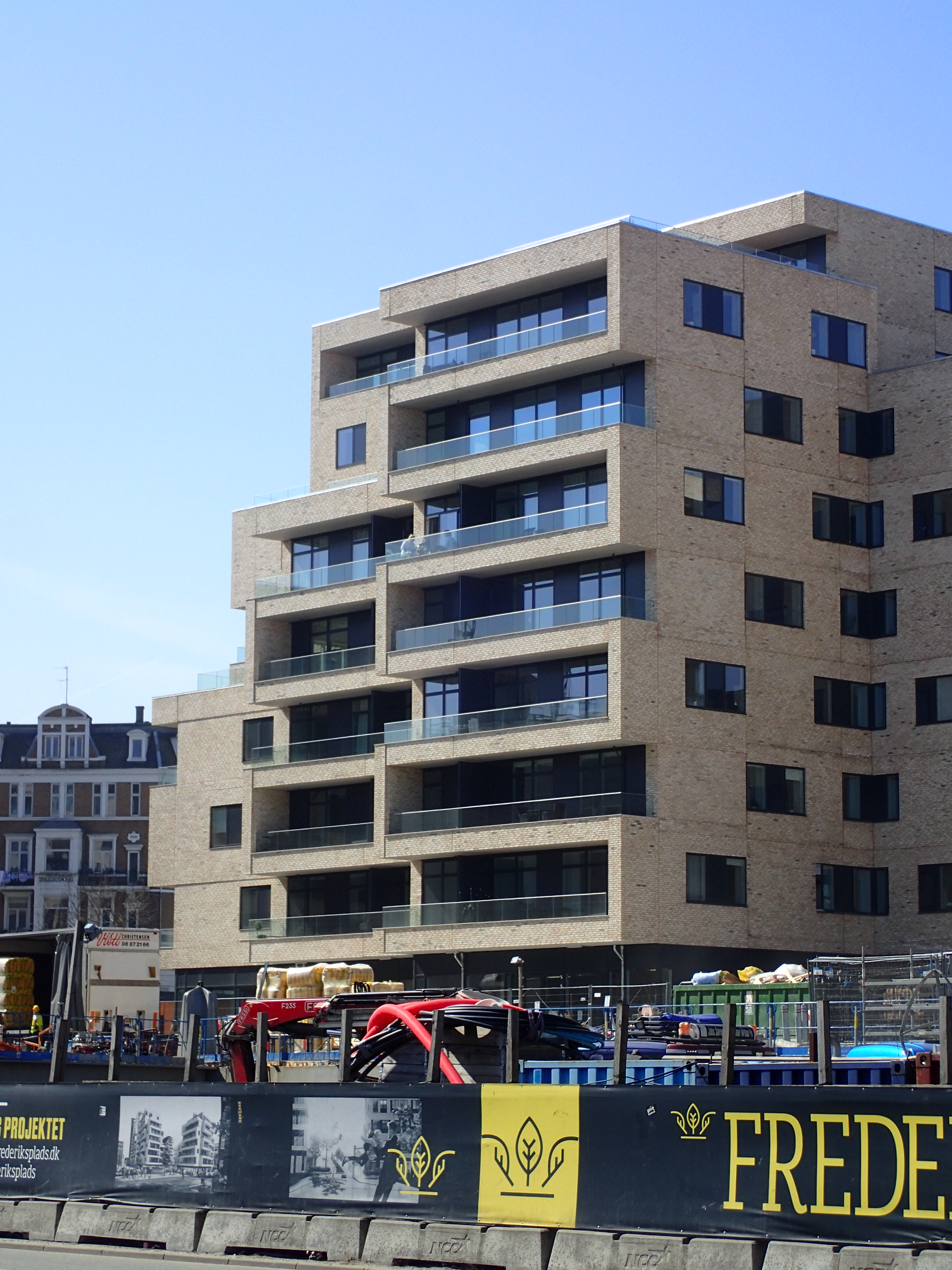
Frederiks Plads, under construction

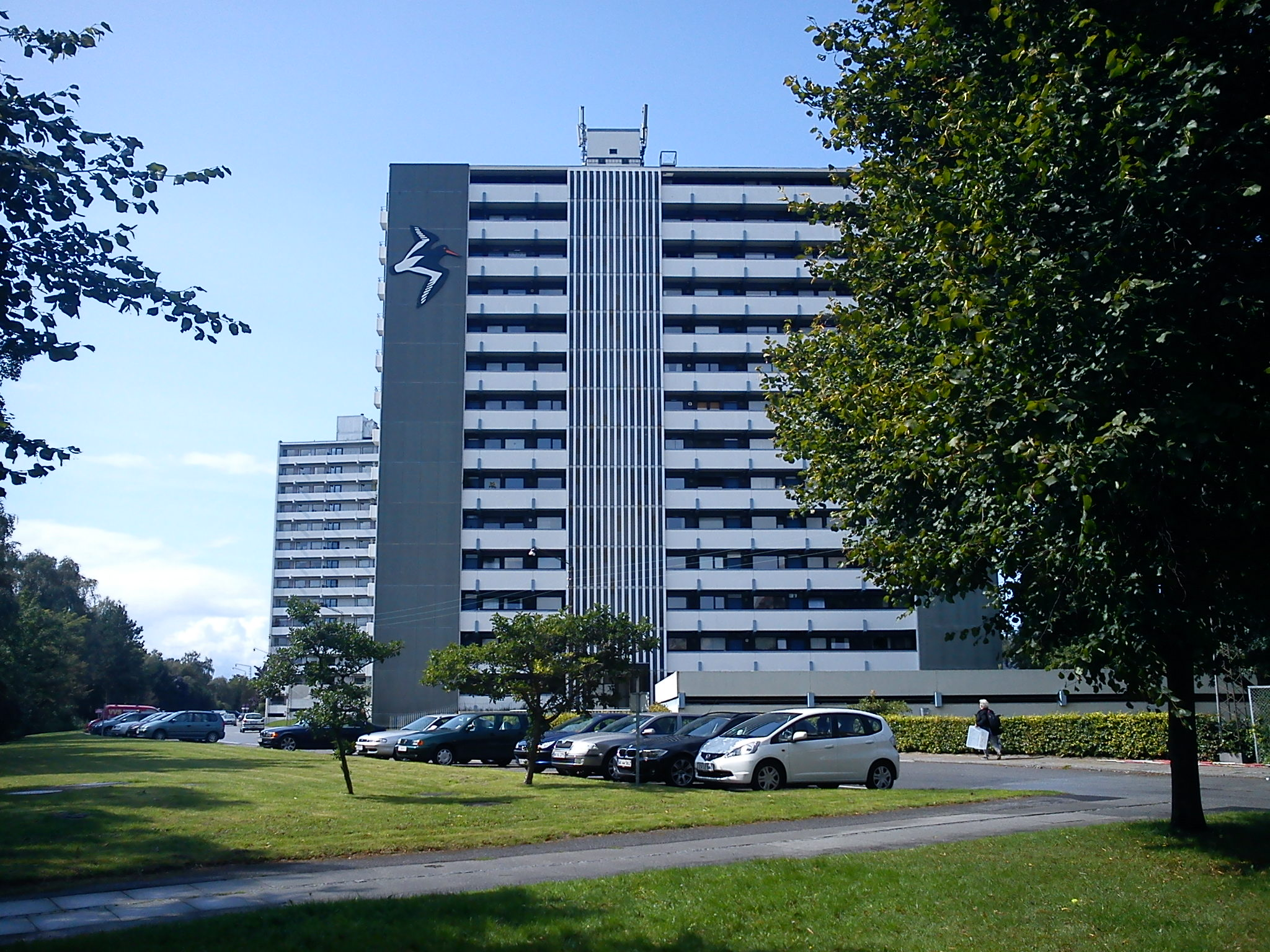
Højhusene Marselis Boulevard, modernist highrises (1967)

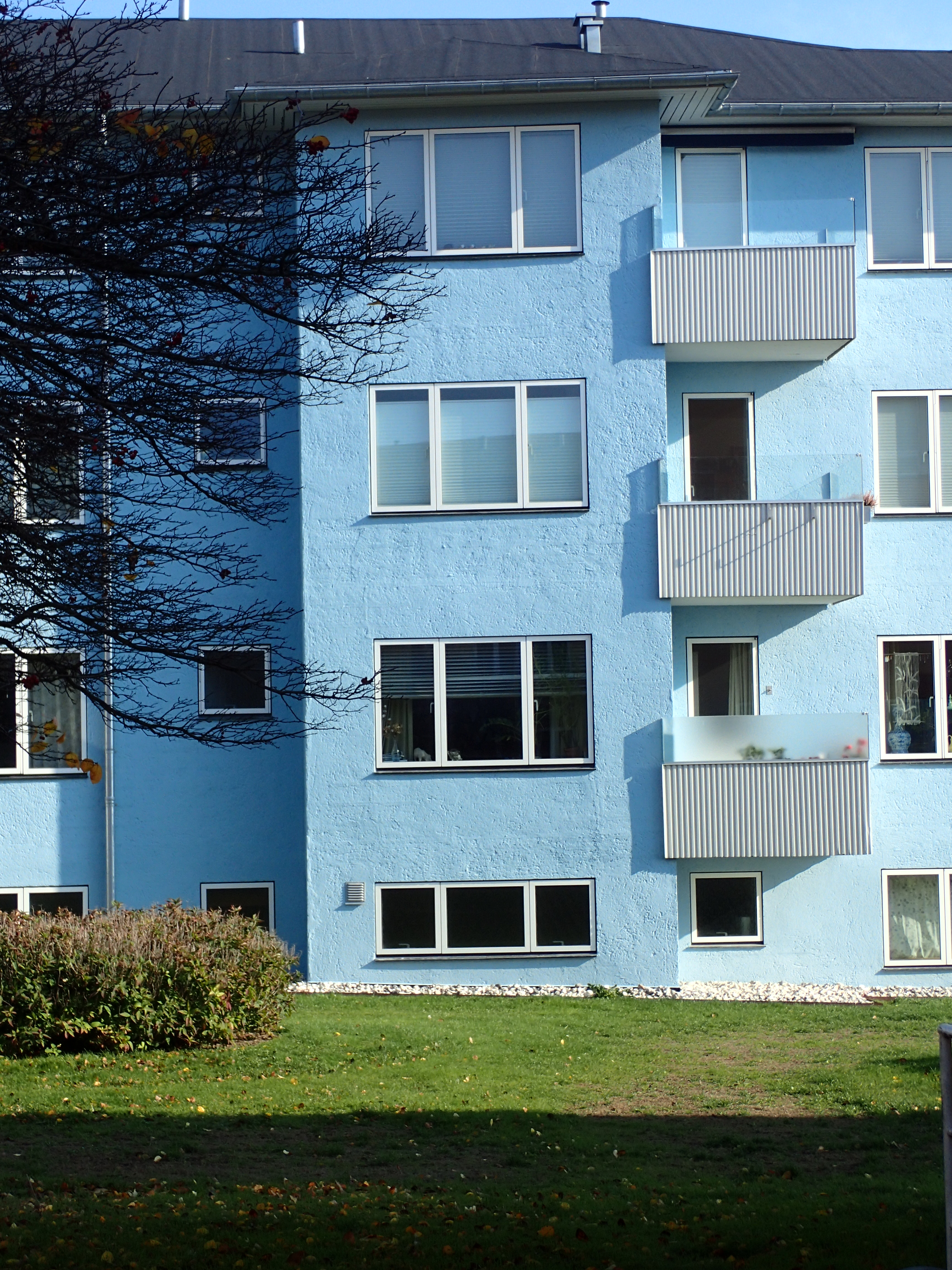
Strandparken, typical Danish funkis (1938)

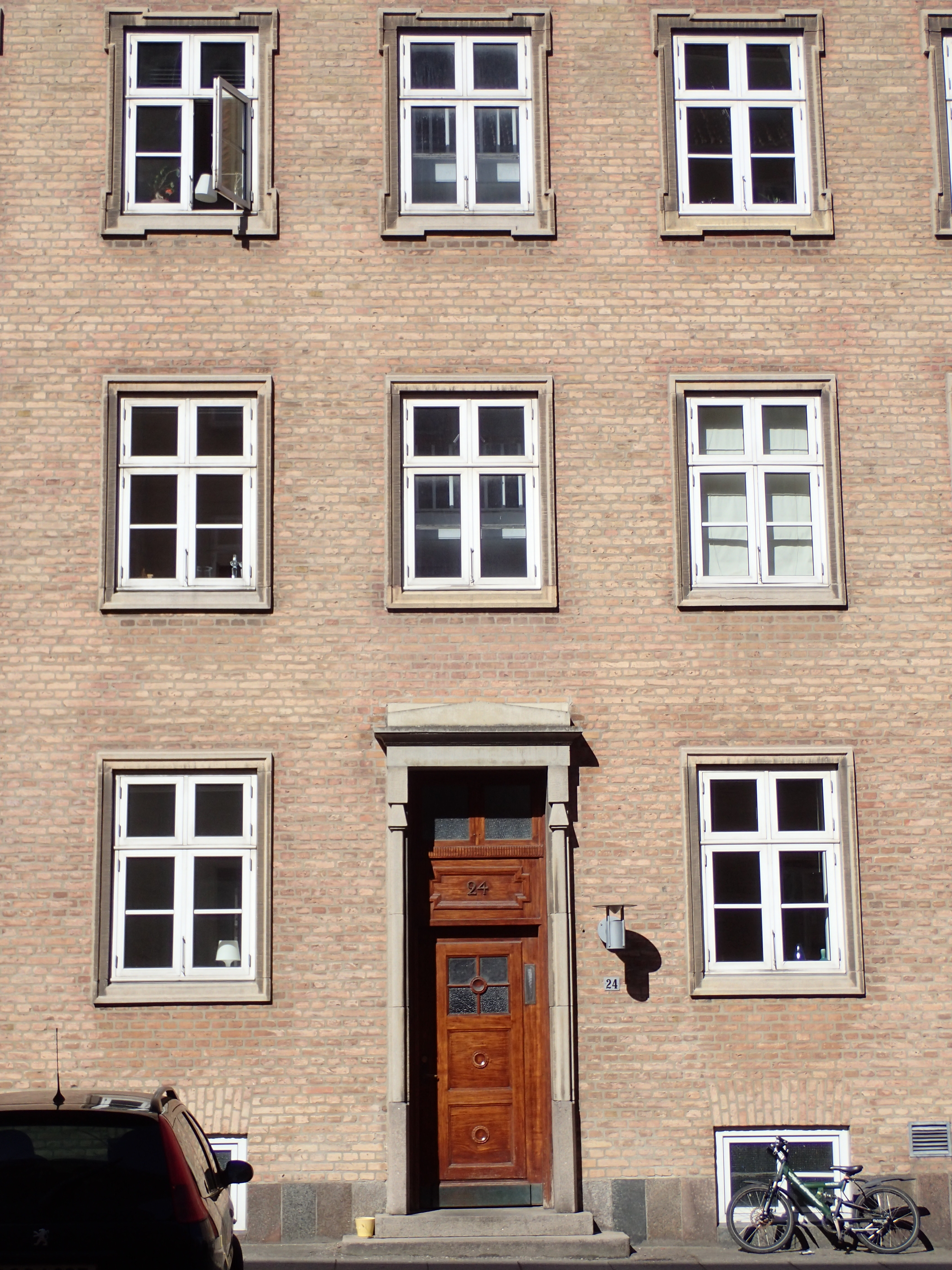
Frederiksbjerg-bo, neo-classical architecture (1927)

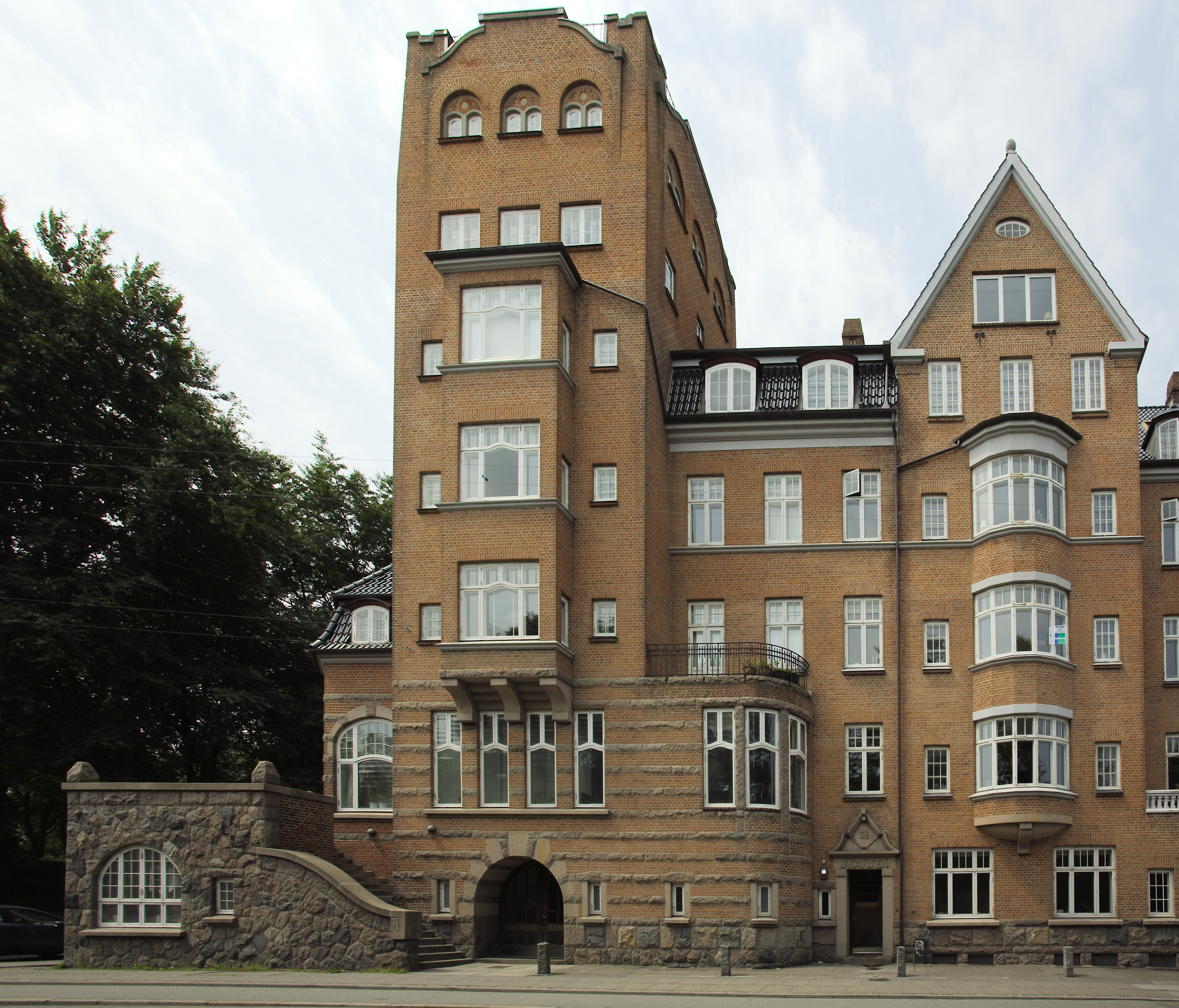
Skansen (1909) at Skanseparken.

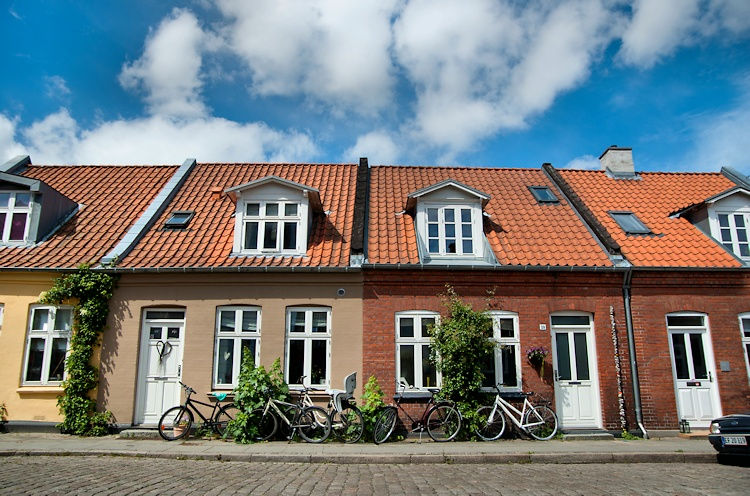
Typical townhouses

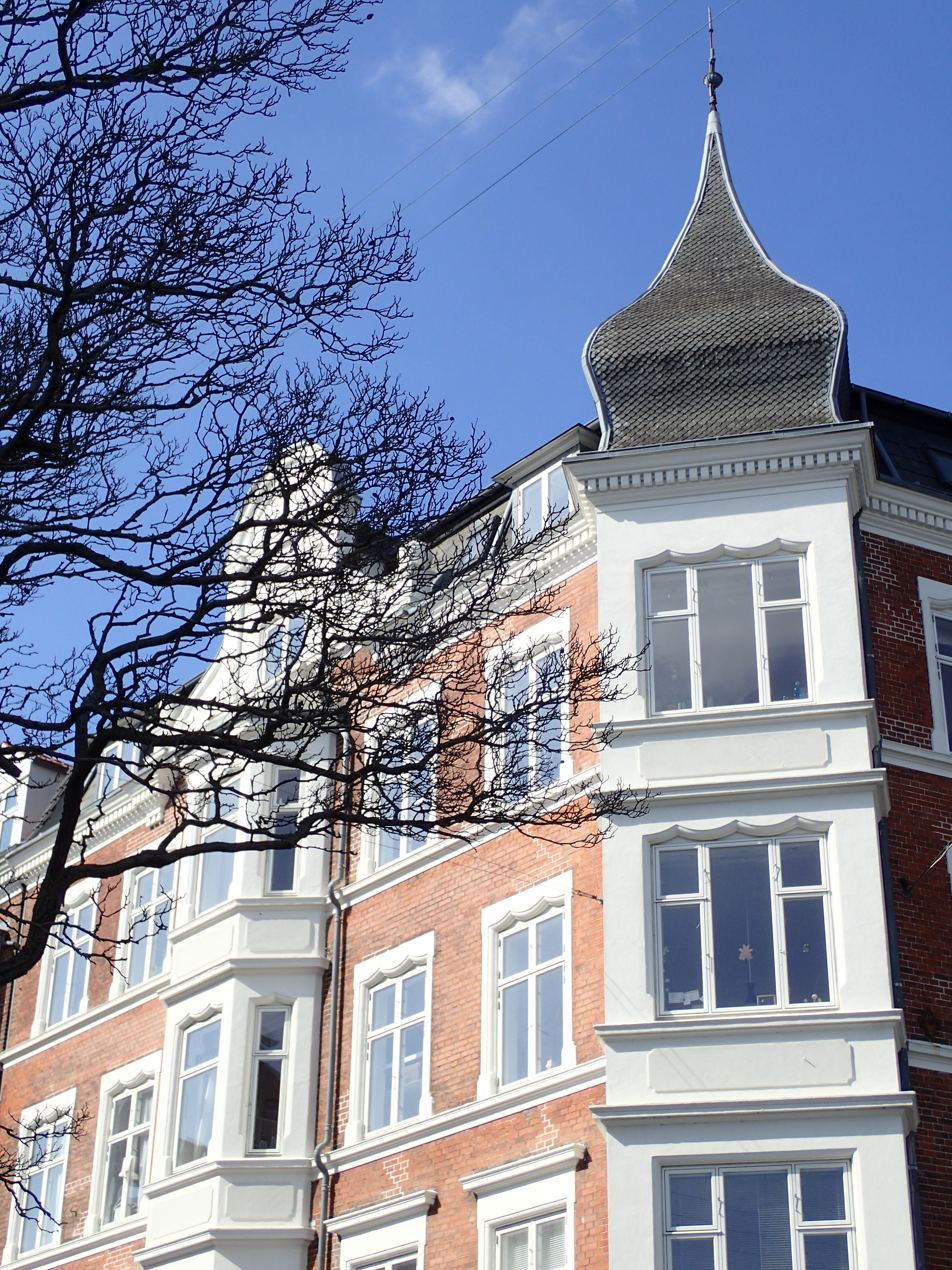
Historicist architecture from around 1900 is abundant

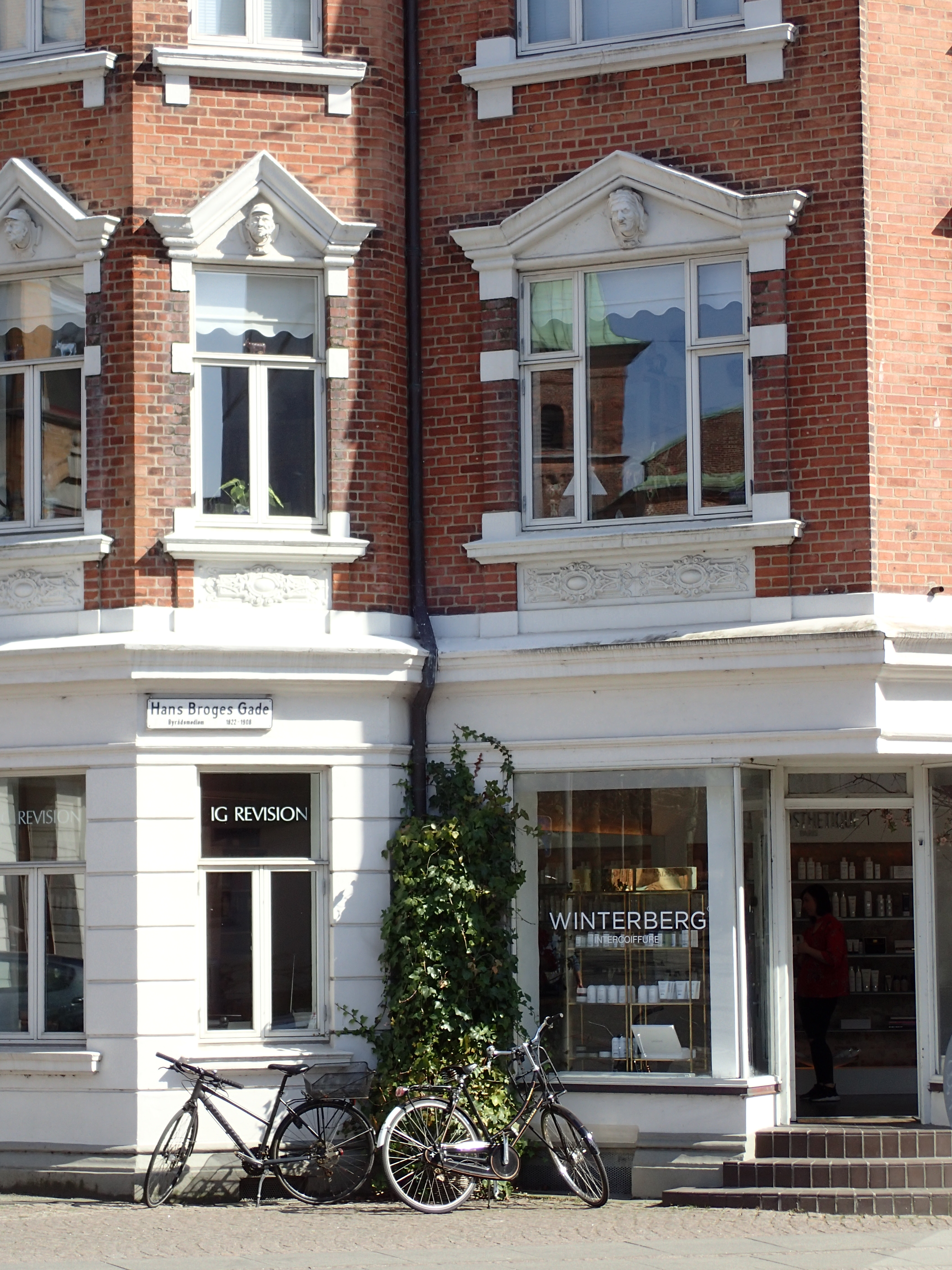

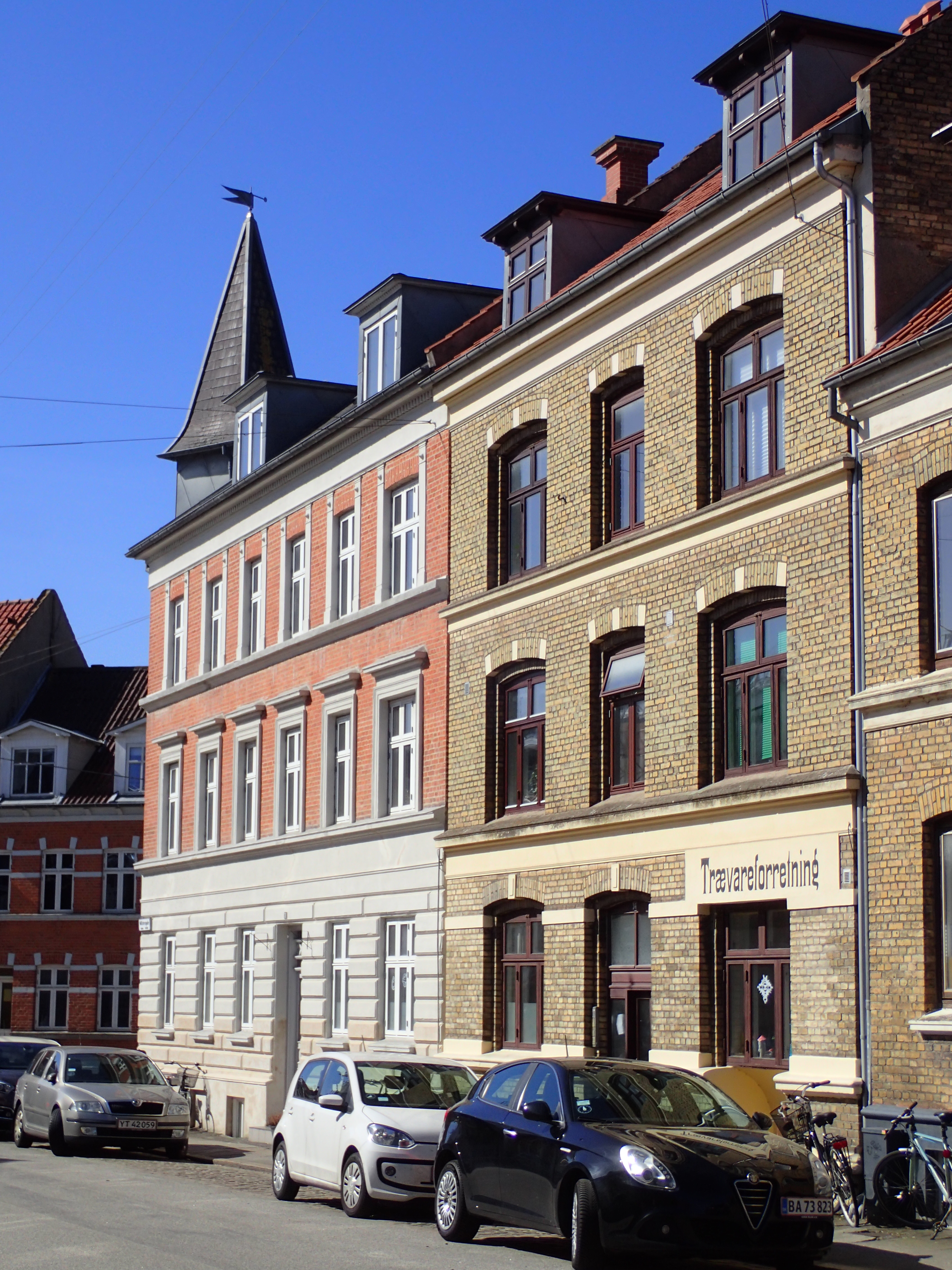
Three- and four-storey buildings are common

== Sources ==
- Magistratens 2. Afdeling (1979): Frederiksbjerg Øst - Århus Kommuneatlas, Aarhus Municipality. On the history and development of Frederiksbjerg. (in Danish)
- Magistratens 2. Afdeling (1981): Frederiksbjerg Vest - Århus Kommuneatlas, Aarhus Municipality. On the history and development of Frederiksbjerg. (in Danish)
