= St. Luke's Church, Aarhus =

Church in Aarhus, Denmark

St. Lukas Church
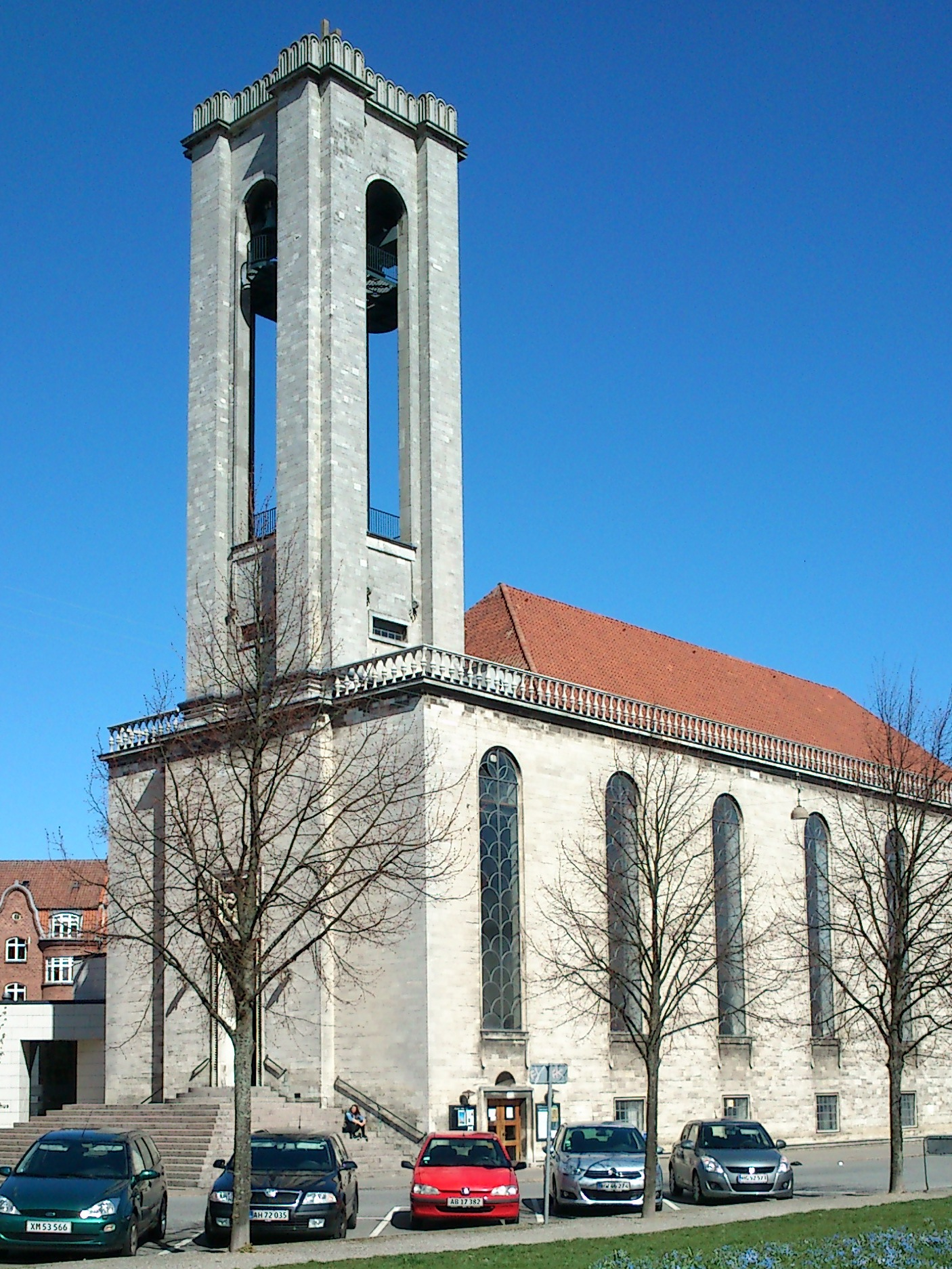
- St. Lukas Church seen from Ingerslevs Boulevard
- St. Lukas Church
- 56.1447°N 10.1937°E
- Location: Skt. Lucas Kirkeplads 1; 8000 Århus C
- Country: Denmark
- Denomination: Church of Denmark

History
- Status: Church

Architecture
- Architect(s): Kaj Gottlob; Anton Frederiksen
- Architectural type: Neoclassical
- Completed: 1926

Specifications
- Materials: Brick

Administration
- Archdiocese: Diocese of Aarhus

St. Lukas Church (Danish: Sankt Lukas Kirke, Skt. Lukas Kirke) is a church in Aarhus, Denmark. The church is situated in the Frederiksbjerg neighbourhood on Skt. Lucas Kirkeplads by Ingerslevs Boulevard. St. Lukas Church is a parish church under the Church of Denmark, the Danish state church, under the Diocese of Aarhus. It is the parish church of St. Lukas Parish which has some 11.000 parish members. The church was designed by architects Anton Frederiksen and Kaj Gottlob in neoclassical style with a 35 meters tall tower. It was constructed between 1921 and 1926 but the crypt under the church, with room for 200 graves, was opened before the church itself, in 1923.

== History ==
During the late 19th century the city of Aarhus was growing rapidly and the central St. Pauls Parish had become the largest in Jutland. It was decided to divide the parish and establish a new church and at the same time, in 1896, the city bought the Marselisborg estate, intending to develop it into a new city neighbourhood. The state engineer of Copenhagen, Charles Ambt, and the royal surveour Hack Kampmann was commissioned to draw plans for what would become the Frederiksbjerg neighbourhood and the result was a large residential area with Ingerslevs Boulevard as a central, open boulevard to accommodate markets and recreational spaces. Construction of the church began in 1921 and was finished in 1926.

== Architecture ==
The church was designed by Kaj Gottlob and Anton Frederiksen and situated by the central Ingerslevs Boulevard in Frederiksbjerg on the axis of Stadion Allé. It is designed to fit into the overall plan of the neighbourhood and the surrounding areas are reflected in the architecture. The boulevard and Stadion Allé are defined by stringent straight lines and the neoclassical Atletion stadium at the southern end of Stadion Allé. The straight lines and symmetry are repeated in the design of the neoclassical church. Surrounding buildings are 5-6 stories which roughly corresponds to the height of the church tower but while the area is dominated by red brick buildings, the church is made of light gray limestone from Faxe.

The structure architecturally presents a monumental appearance with a tall superstructure, dominating tower, large windows, baluster and wide granite stairs. It has a clean, puritanical appearance with few decorations and an open tower with free hanging bells. The church interior is minimalist with few decorations, a wide hall in the nave and a small elevation to the baptismal font.

== See also ==
- List of churches in Aarhus
