= Einar Ambt =

Danish architect

Einar Ambt (22 March 1877, Copenhagen – 21 December 1928, Copenhagen) was a Danish architect.

== Early life and education ==
Ambt was born on 22 March 1877 in Copenhagen, the son of Christian Ambt and Thekla Emilie Eleanor Mathilde Johnsen. His father served as City Engineer in Copenhagen from 1886 to 1902 and then as Director-General of the Danish State Railways until 1915. Ambt became a bricklayer in 1896 and simultaneously attended technical school. He was then accepted to the Royal Danish Academy of Fine Arts, graduating as an architect in 1904.

== Career ==
He worked for Danish architect Gotfred Tvede for six years and, at the insistence of his father, worked for Danish architect Heinrich Wenck on Copenhagen Central Station from 1904 to 1912. He started his own practice in 1912.

He was a member of the board of directors for The Architects' Association of Denmark from 1908 to 1910 and, from 1915, he served on the board of the Kreditkassen for Husejere i Kjøbenhavn (Credit Union for Homeowners in Copenhagen). He collaborated with the architect Axel Preisler on many works in his career.

On 2 April 1909 he married Josephine Johanne Marie Hansen (b. 23 July 1878) in Copenhagen. Ambt travelled to Germany, Switzerland, Italy, Finland, England, France and the Netherlands during his life.

He won the New Residential Property of the Year Award in 1915. He participated in the National Exhibition of 1909 in Aarhus and in the Charlottenborg Spring Exhibition in 1918, 1921, 1922 and 1927. Together with Axel Preisler, he received the Diplom d'Honneur in Ghent in 1921.

He died during construction of the Kreditkassen for Husejere i Kjøbenhavn at Rådhuspladsen 59 in Copenhagen. The building was completed by Gunnar Juul Brask in 1929. Ambt is buried at Vestre Cemetery in Copenhagen.

== Selected works ==
Alone:

- Villa in Hasseris, Aalborg (1907)
- Nykøbing Water Tower, Nykøbing Falster (1908)
- Villa in Krogerup (1915)
- Tanning Acid Factory, Oliemøllegade, Copenhagen (1915)
- Villa at Lindevej 12, Frederiksberg (1915)
- Summerhouses – Nødebohuse, (1916)
- Country home at Nødebohuse, (1919)
- Karréerne at Genforeningspladsen 41–51 & 42–52, Copenhagen (1924)
- Corner Building at Bryggervangen/Vennemindevej 23–27, Copenhagen (1925, award-winner)
- Banana ripening storeroom, Godsbanegården, Struergade (1923 og 1928)
- Banana ripening room for A.W. Kirkebye, Århus (1927–28)
- Kreditkassen for Husejere i Kjøbenhavn, Rådhuspladsen 59, Copenhagen (1928, completed by Gunnar Juul Brask in 1929)

In collaboration with Axel Preisler:

- Pavillon in Voigts Minde near Fåborg (1911)
- Train stations in Nr. Nebel-Tarm, Varde-Grindsted, Ryomgård- Gjerrild and Hundested-Frederiksværk (from 1911)
- Falkoner Allé 44–46, Frederiksberg (1913–14, award-winner)
- Strandboulevarden 77A-81, Østerbro (1914, award-winner)
- Nakskov Harbour Building (1915)
- Villa, Gammel Vartov Vej 2, Ryvangen (1915)
- Villa, Borgebakken, now Lyngby-Taarbæk Municipality's care home, Brede (1915–16)
- Villa Strandgården, Richelieus Allé 16, Hellerup (1915–16, award-winner)
- Lille Bernstorff, Jægersborg Allé, Charlottenlund (1916–17, award-winner)
- Summer home, Skodsborg Strandvej 81, Skodsborg (1917)
- Villa, Bernstorfflund Allé 2, Hellerup (1917, award-winner)
- Villa, Richelieus Allé 14, Hellerup (1917, award-winner)
- Villa, Sofievej 15, Hellerup (1917–18)
- Villa, Tesdorfsvej 40–44, Frederiksberg (1917–18)
- Main Building, Endrupgård near Fredensborg (1918)
- Villa, Hambros Allé 30, Hellerup (1919)
- Apartment buildings, Guldbergsgade 72–82, Sjællandsgade, Fensmarksgade og Tibirkegade (1921)
- Villa, Rosbæksvej 22, Ryvangen (1922)
- Villa Stubben in Gilleleje (1922)

== See also ==
- List of Danish architects
