= Frederiksbjerg School =

School in Aarhus, Denmark

Coordinates: 56.1453°N 10.1977°E

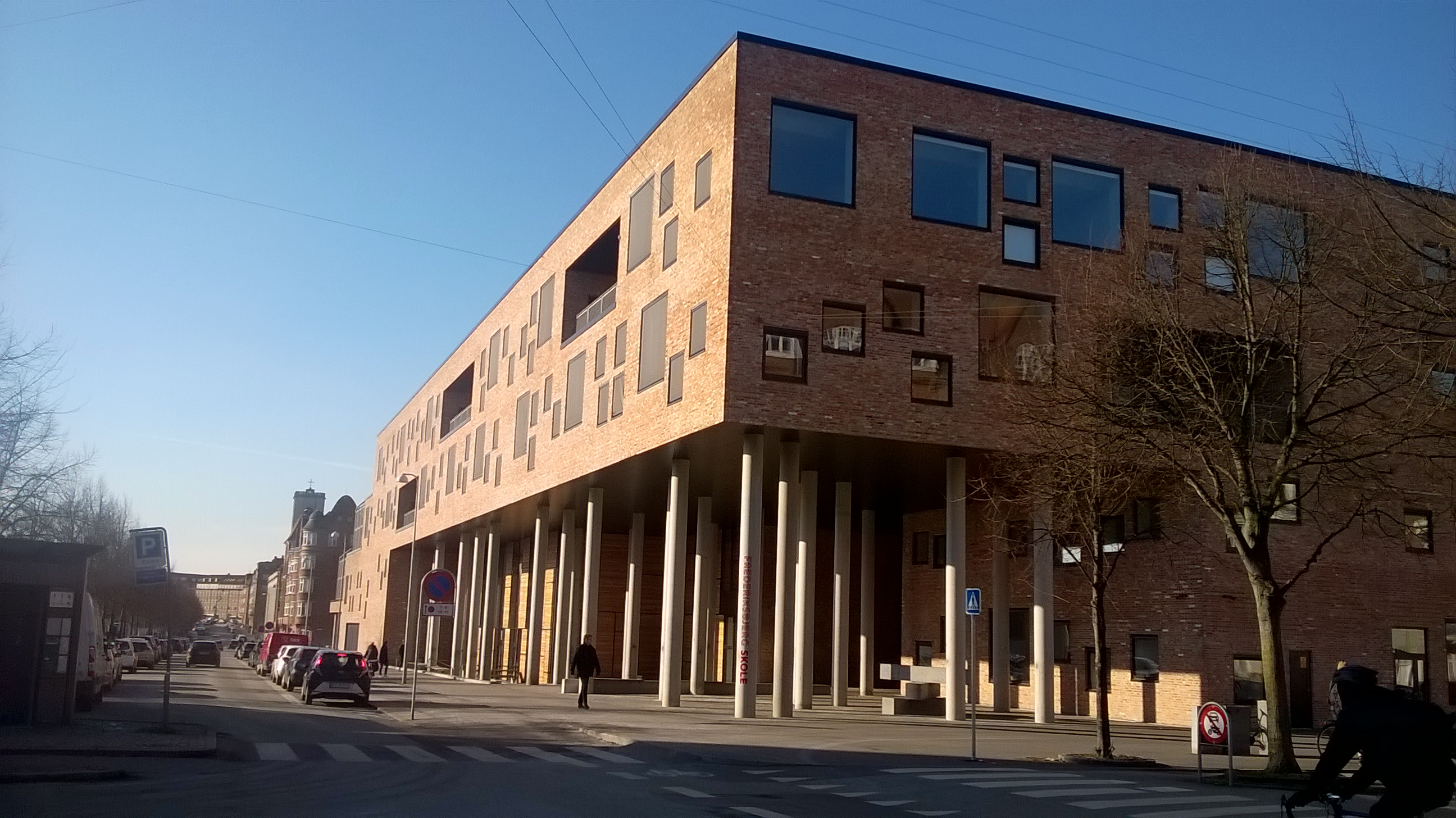

Frederiksbjerg School is a folkeskole in the Frederiksbjerg neighborhood of Aarhus. The school has 965 students.

The building was designed by Henning Larsen Architects and was opened in August 2016.
