= Charles Ambt =

Danish engineer (1847–1919)

Georg Christian Charles Ambt
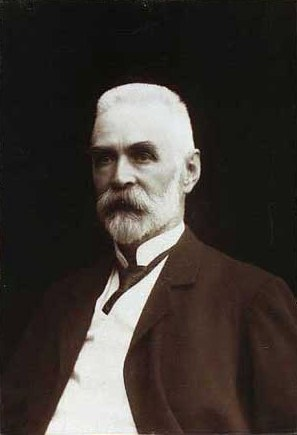
- Charles Ambt
- Born: February 24, 1847
- Died: July 15, 1919
- Education: College of Advanced Technology
- Occupation: Engineer
- Known for: Copenhagen Central Station
- Spouse: Thekla Emilie Eleonora Mathilde Johnsen
- Parent(s): Jens Frederick Ambt; Anna Margareta Julie Langreuter
- Relatives: Einar Ambt (son)

Georg Christian Charles Ambt (24 February 1847 – 15 July 1919) was a Danish engineer who served as City Engineer in Copenhagen from 1886 to 1902 and then as Director-General of the Danish State Railways (DSB) until 1915. During his tenure as City Engineer, he was responsible for modernizing and expanding the city's sewage system. He is also remembered for planning Queen Louise's Vridge and for major infrastructure projects such as the extension of Tagensvej, Borups Allé and Vigerslev Allé. As Director-General of the Danish State Railways, he is above allremembered for the construction of the new Copenhagen Central Station and the Boulevard Line in Copenhagen. He was the father of architect Einar Ambt.

== Early life and education ==
Ambt was born on 24 February 1847 in Copenhagen, the son of glazier and later retailer Jens Frederik Ambt (1819–1874) and Anna Margareta Julie Langreuter (1824–1898). He graduated from the College of Advanced Technology in 1868.

== Career ==
Ambt was initially employed by Copenhagen Port Authority. He worked on the new Knippelsbro. In 1869, he joined Copenhagen's Cobbling and Roads Administration to work on the removal and redevelopment of the city's old fortifications terrain. On 1 July 1875 a new position as deputy director of the Roads Administration was created for Ambt. In 1886, Ambt succeeded L. A. Coldings as City Engineer in Copenhagen. He was responsible for modernizing and expanding's the city's sewage system.

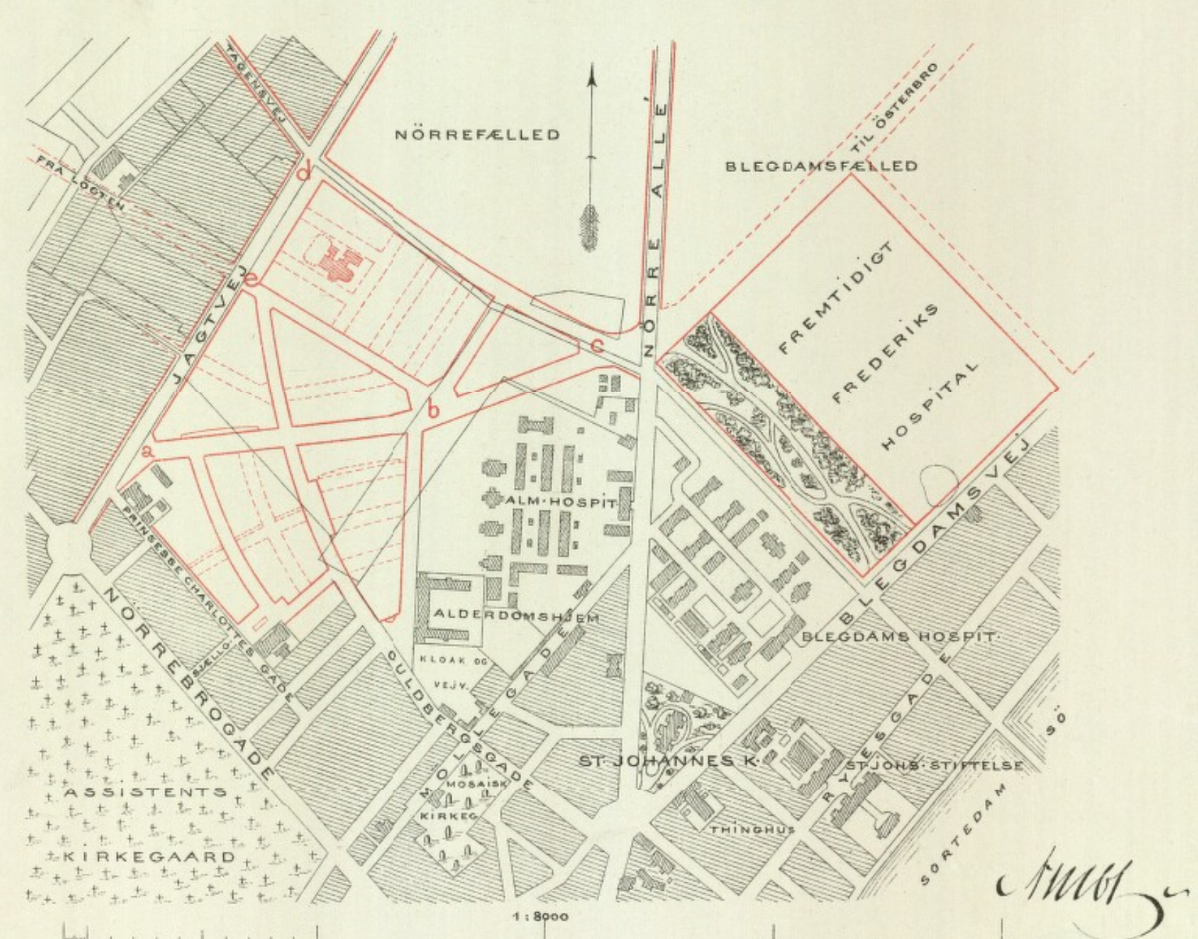
Ambt's plan for the extension of Tagensvej.

In 1885, Ambt ran for the office as Technical Mayor in Copenhagen but lost to C. K. Øllgaard. From 1885 he also worked as a teacher at the College of Advanced Technology. In 1883–84. he was responsible for the construction of a sewage system in Nakskov. He later also constructed a new sewage system and waterworks in Nykøbing Falster, waterworks in Korsør and a sewage system in Holstebro. He also created plans for sewage systems in Malmö and Lund as well as roads and sanitary installations in Copenhagen. He also constructed Dronning Louises Bro and roads such as the extension of Tagensvej, Borups Allé and Vigerslev allé. In 1889, he received a prize for his project for a freeport n Copenhagen.

In 1889 he won the competition for the planning of the new Copenhagen Central Station. In 1902, Ambt succeeded I. W. Tegner as Firector-General of the Danish State Railways. Ambt was responsible for the construction of the new Copenhagen Central Station, Voulevardbanen and cpmplete transformations of the railway stations in Odense and Korsør as well as new double-tracks across Funen. He was a member of numerous commissions, both in Denmark and Norway and Sweden.

Ambt was a board member of the Danish Union of Engineers from its foundation and the chairman in 1901–04. At his retirement in 1915 he was made an honorary member of the organisation.

== Personal life ==
On 4 March 1874, in Gåborg, Ambt married Thekla Emilie Eleonora Mathilde Johnsen (1855–1917). She was the daughter of bookbinder and bookdealer Carl Christian Ulrich Jonsen (1817–1893) and Charlotte Amalie Hansen (1820–1863). Ambt was the father of architect Einar Ambt.

He is one of the men seen in Peder Severin Krøyer's monumental 1904 pol-on-canvas group portrait painting Men of Industry. His portrait has also been painted by August Jerndorff ( 1905, Copenhagen City Hall), Knud Larsen (1907, Ingeniørforeningen) and Berthe Wegmann (1918, DSB)- The facade of Copenhagen Central Station features a stone bust of him.

Ambt died on 15 July 1919 and is buried in Copenhagen's Western Cemetery.

== Awards ==
Ambt was created a Knight of the Order of the Dannebrog in 1888, a Commander of the Second Class in 1901 and a Commander of the First Class in 1911. He was awarded the Cross of Honour in 1893.
