= Marcellus (name) =

Marcellus is a masculine given name and a surname, which comes from the Roman god of war Mars.

== Given name ==
Notable people with the name include:

- Marcellus, character in William Shakespeare's tragic play Hamlet
- Marcus Claudius Marcellus (42–23 B.C.), nephew of Augustus
- Marcus Claudius Marcellus (fl. 3rd century B.C.), Roman consul and military leader
  - Claudii Marcelli, any men from his clan branch of gens Claudia
- Marcellus (archbishop of Esztergom) (fl. 1095–1124)
- Marcellus (magister equitum) (4th century), General in Gaul appointed by Constantuis II
- Marcellus (brother of Justin II) (fl. late 6th century), Byzantine aristocrat and general
- Marcellus (comes excubitorum) (fl. 6th century), commander of the Excubitors
- Marcellus (general under Justinian I) (fl. 530s), Byzantine general
- Marcellus (usurper) (died 366), Roman general
- Marcellus (prefect of Judea) (fl. 30s), mentioned in Josephus
- Marcellus of Ancyra (died c. 374), bishop
- Marcellus Bailey (1840–1921), American patent attorney
- Marcellus Flemming Berry, inventor
- Marcellus Boss (1901–1967), Governor of Guam
- Marcellus Bowman (born 1988), Canadian football player
- Frank Marcellus Boyce (1851–1931), American physician
- Marcellus of Capua (fl. 3rd or 4th century), martyr
- Alonzo Marcellus Carroll (1894–1962), American football player
- Marcellus H. Chiles (1895–1918), American Army soldier and Medal of Honor recipient
- Cassius Marcellus Clay (disambiguation)
- Marcellus Jerome Clarke (1844–1865), American Civil War soldier and guerrilla
- Marcellus Coffermans (1520–1578), Flemish painter
- Cassius Marcellus Coolidge (1844–1934), American artist
- Marcellus M. Crocker (1830–1865), American Civil War general
- Marcellus Hartley Dodge (disambiguation)
- Marcellus Dorwin (1861–1925), American politician
- Marcellus Douglass (died 1862), American Civil War soldier
- Marcellus Gilmore Edson (1849–1940), Canadian inventor
- Marcellus Emants (1848–1923), Dutch novelist
- Marcellus Empiricus (fl. late 4th and early 5th centuries), Latin medical writer
- Marcellus Gallio, character in the Lloyd C. Douglas novel The Robe
- Marcellus Gomes (born 1961), Indian field hockey player
- William Marcellus Goodrich (1777–1833), American organ builder
- Marcellus Greene (born 1957), American football player
- Marcellus Hall, American artist and musician
- Marcellus Hartley (1827–1902), American arms dealer
- Nicholas Marcellus Hentz (1797–1856), French-American educator
- William Marcellus Howard (1857–1932), American politician
- John Marcellus Huston (1906–1987), American film director
- Marcellus Johnson (born 2000), American football player
- Marcellus Jones (1830–1900), American Civil War soldier
- Marcellus L. Joslyn (1873–1963), American businessman
- James Marcellus Kendrick (1893–1941), American football player
- George Marcellus Landers (1813–1895), American politician
- Marcellus Laroon (1653–1702), Dutch painter
- Marcellus Laroon the Younger (1679–1772), English painter
- Laurence Marcellus Larson (1868–1938), Norwegian-born American educator
- Joseph Marcellus McWhorter (1828–1913), American lawyer
- Nathan Marcellus Moore (born 1965), English musician
- Marcellus Deming Nave (born 1880; death date unknown), American college football coach
- Marcellus Neal (1868–1939), first African-American graduate of Indiana University
- Marcellus de Niveriis (died 1460 or 1462), German Franciscan
- Marcellus Orontius (fl. 3rd century), neoplatonist and disciple of Plotinus
- John Marcellus Richter (1873–1927), American baseball player
- Marcellus Rivers (born 1978), American football player
- Marcellus of Side (fl. 2nd century), Greek poet
- Marcellus Stearns (1839–1891), American politician
- Robert Marcellus Stewart (1815–1871), Governor of Missouri
- Marcellus Augustus Stovall (1818–1895), American Civil War soldier
- Marcellus of Tangier (c. mid 3rd century – 298), martyr
- Marsellus Wallace, a character in the movie Pulp Fiction
- Cadmus Marcellus Wilcox (1824–1890), American Civil War general
- Marcellus Wiley (born 1974), American football player
- Cal Marcellus Young (1871–1957), American college football coach
- Marcus Claudius Marcellus Aeserninus, any of several members of the gens Claudia
- Pope Marcellus (disambiguation)
- Pseudo-Marcellus, author of the Passio sanctorum Petri et Pauli

== Surname ==
- Abercius Marcellus (died c. 167), Roman bishop
- Gaius Claudius Marcellus (disambiguation)
- Granius Marcellus (fl. 15), Roman politician
- John Marcellus, American musician
- John Plummer Marcellus (1838–1932), Canadian politician
- Lucius Neratius Marcellus (fl. 1st and 2nd century), Roman consul
- Marcus Asinius Marcellus (fl. 1st century), Roman consul
- Marcus Claudius Marcellus (disambiguation)
- Marcus Vitorius Marcellus (c. 60 - after 105), Roman politician
- Nawoon Marcellus, Haitian politician
- Nonius Marcellus (fl. 4th or 5th century), Roman grammarian
- Robert Marcellus (1928–1996), American classical clarinetist
- Sextus Varius Marcellus (c. 165 – c. 215), Roman politician
- Titus Clodius Eprius Marcellus (died 79), Roman politician
- Ulpius Marcellus (fl. 2nd Century), Roman governor and general
- Ulpius Marcellus (son) (fl. 211–212), latest-recorded governor of Britannia

== Variants ==
- Marcus
- Martin
- Mario
- Marianus

== See also ==
- Marcel, given name
- Marcela, female given name
- Marcelo, given name
- Marcello, given name
- Marsalis, surname
- Marselis, surname
