= Viby Church, Aarhus =

Church in Denmark

Viby Church
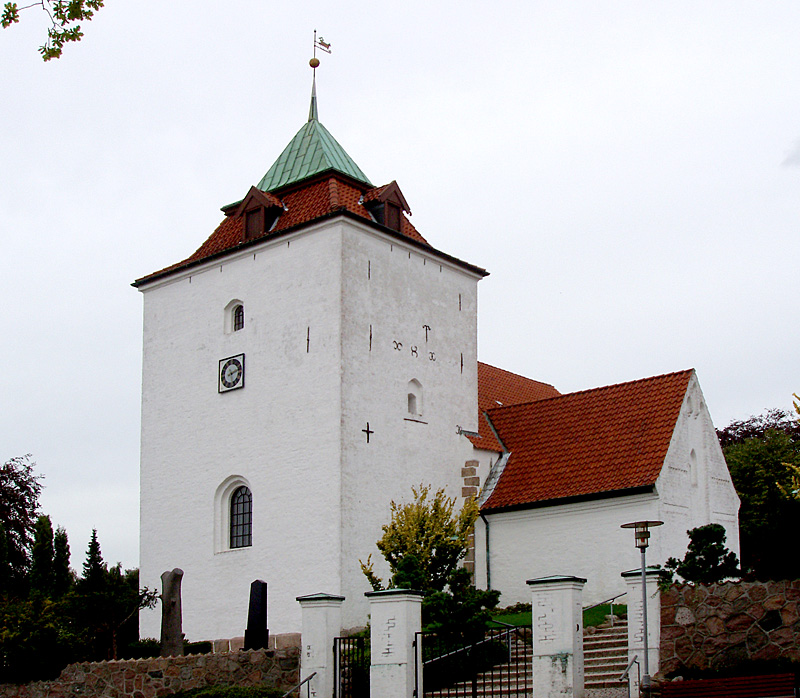
- Viby Church
- 56.128003°N 10.165750°E
- Location: Aarhus, Denmark
- Country: Denmark
- Denomination: Church of Denmark
- Previous denomination: Catholic Church

History
- Status: Church

Architecture
- Architectural type: Romanesque
- Completed: 1100s

Specifications
- Materials: Brick

Administration
- Archdiocese: Diocese of Aarhus

Viby Church (Danish: Viby Kirke) is a church located in Viby Parish in Aarhus, Denmark. The church is situated in the neighbourhood Viby, west of Marselisborg. It is a parish church which belongs to the Church of Denmark and there's population of 8.211 within the parish borders (2015).

== History ==
Viby church was built in the late 12th century and was likely originally the property of the king. In 1661 the state elected to sell the church to Gabriel Marselis in order to pay off war debts. In 1710 the church was sold again, this time to Christian Charisius, who owned Constantinsborg. In 1771 the baron of Marselisborg bought it and the church stayed with the Marselisborg estate until Minister of the Interior Hans Peter Ingerslev acquired the estate in 1835. The church was sold to Aarhus Municipality in 1896 and two years later, in 1898, it was given to Viby Municipality. In 1970 Viby Municipality was absorbed into Aarhus municipality but 5 years later, in 1975, the church was made an independent entity within the Church of Denmark, although Aarhus municipality continued to administer the cemetery until 1 April 1996.

== Architecture ==
It is probable that the king had the patronage of Viby church in the Middle Ages. The church, which is now situated in a neighbourhood of Aarhus, consists of Romanesque apse, chancel and nave with two late-Medieval additions: the porch in the south and the tower in the west. The Romanesque sections are built of rough and hewn granite boulders on a chamfered base; ashlar were used in the corners and around the windows and doors. Between 1449 and 1482 vaults were included in chancel and nave. In the masonry of the tower a quantity of re-used granite ashlar is included which may have been brought here from a demolished church. The spire, which is in a mansard style, was erected in 1785. The present-day appearance of the church is characterized by a restoration in 1962, during which wall-painting decoration in the usual late Gothic style of the diocese was revealed in all the vaulting.

Among the articles of furniture in the church, the pulpit from c. 1610 deserves special mention. It is ascribed to the woodcarver Mikkel van Grønningen in Hornslet, who supplied works both for Aarhus Cathedral and several East Jutland churches, including Trige. The altarpiece and altar candlesticks were also obtained in the first half of the 17th century, while the Romanesque baptismal font was retained as usually happened. The greater part of the furniture, which showed the church's former close relationship with the Constantinsborg and Marselisborg estates, has now disappeared, and only a chasuble cross from about 1700 has been preserved. The clockwork in the tower is from the beginning of the 19th century. In the cemetery tombstones from the 17th century indicate the graves of clergy belonging to the same family.

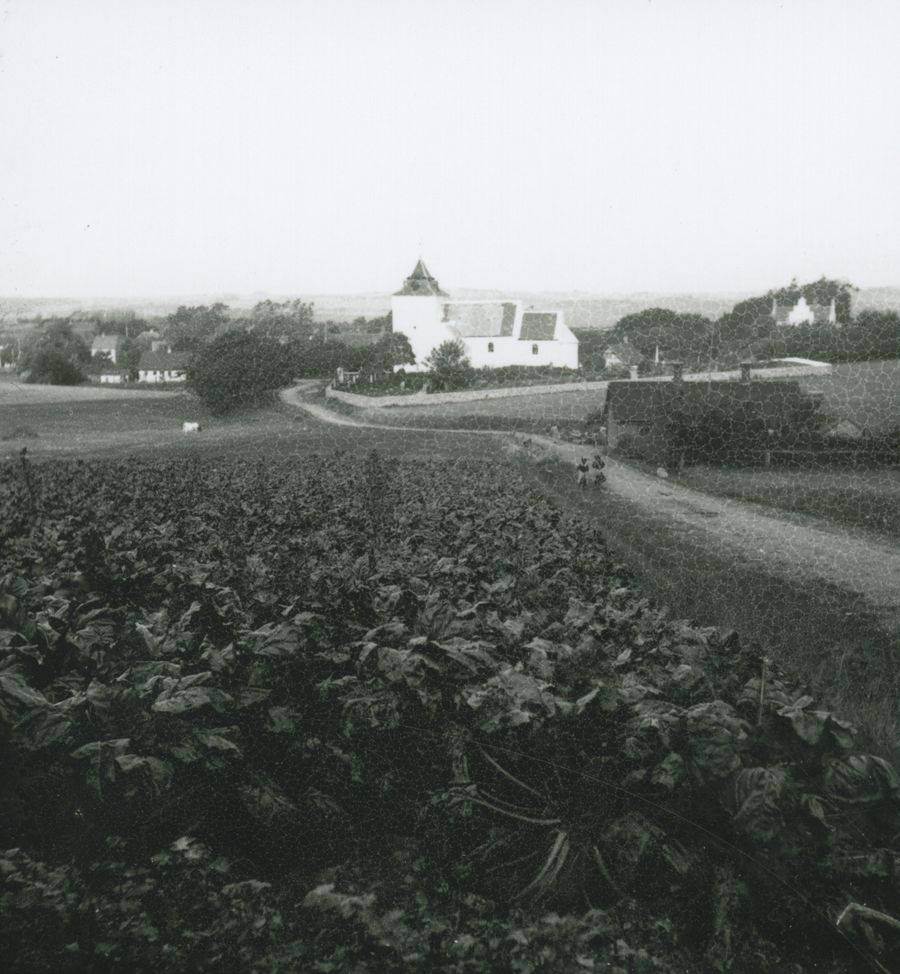
Viby Church c. 1900

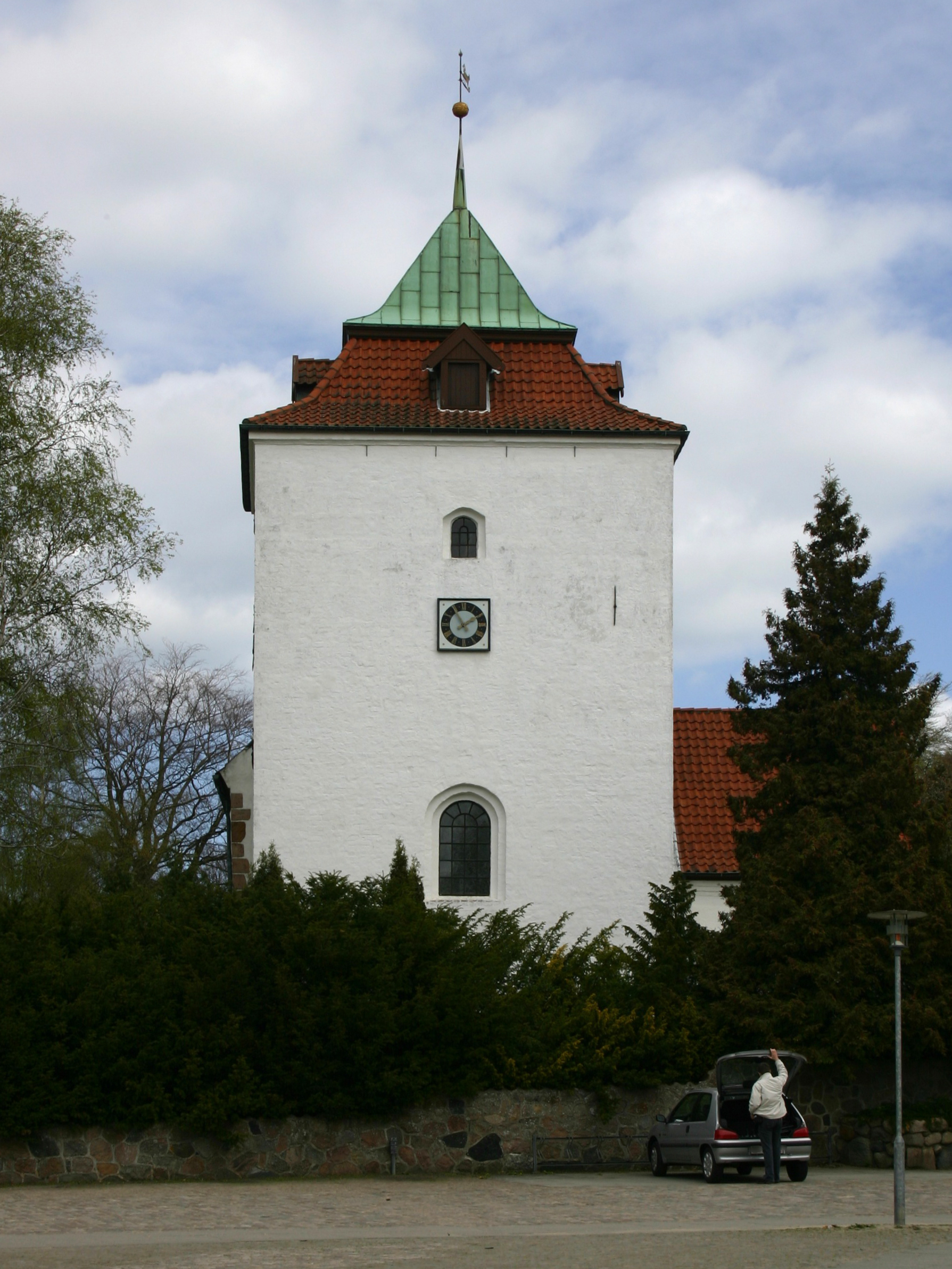
Tower of Viby Church

== See also ==
- List of Churches in Aarhus
