= Marselis =

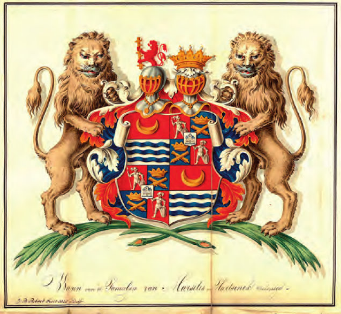
Coat of arms of the Marselis family

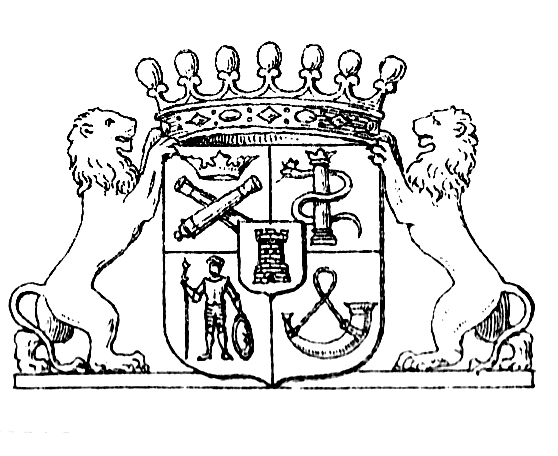
Coat of arms of the Barons of Marselisburg

The Marselis family is a wealthy Scandinavian family of Dutch origin, which belonged to the Norwegian nobility.

== History ==
Members of the family held the title Baron of Marselisburg in Norway. Family later spread through Denmark and Poland.

== Notable members ==
- Gabriel Marselis (1609–1673), Dutch tradesman and landowner
- Constantin Marselis (1647–1699), Dutch nobleman
- Selius Marselis (1600–1663), Dutch-Norwegian tradesman
- Gabriel Marselis, Sr. (c. 1575–1643), Dutch merchant
- Christof Marselis, Polish-Dutch architect

== See also ==
- Marsalis, surname
- Marcellus (name), given name and surname
