= Rugaard =

Castle in Denmark

Rugaard Castle
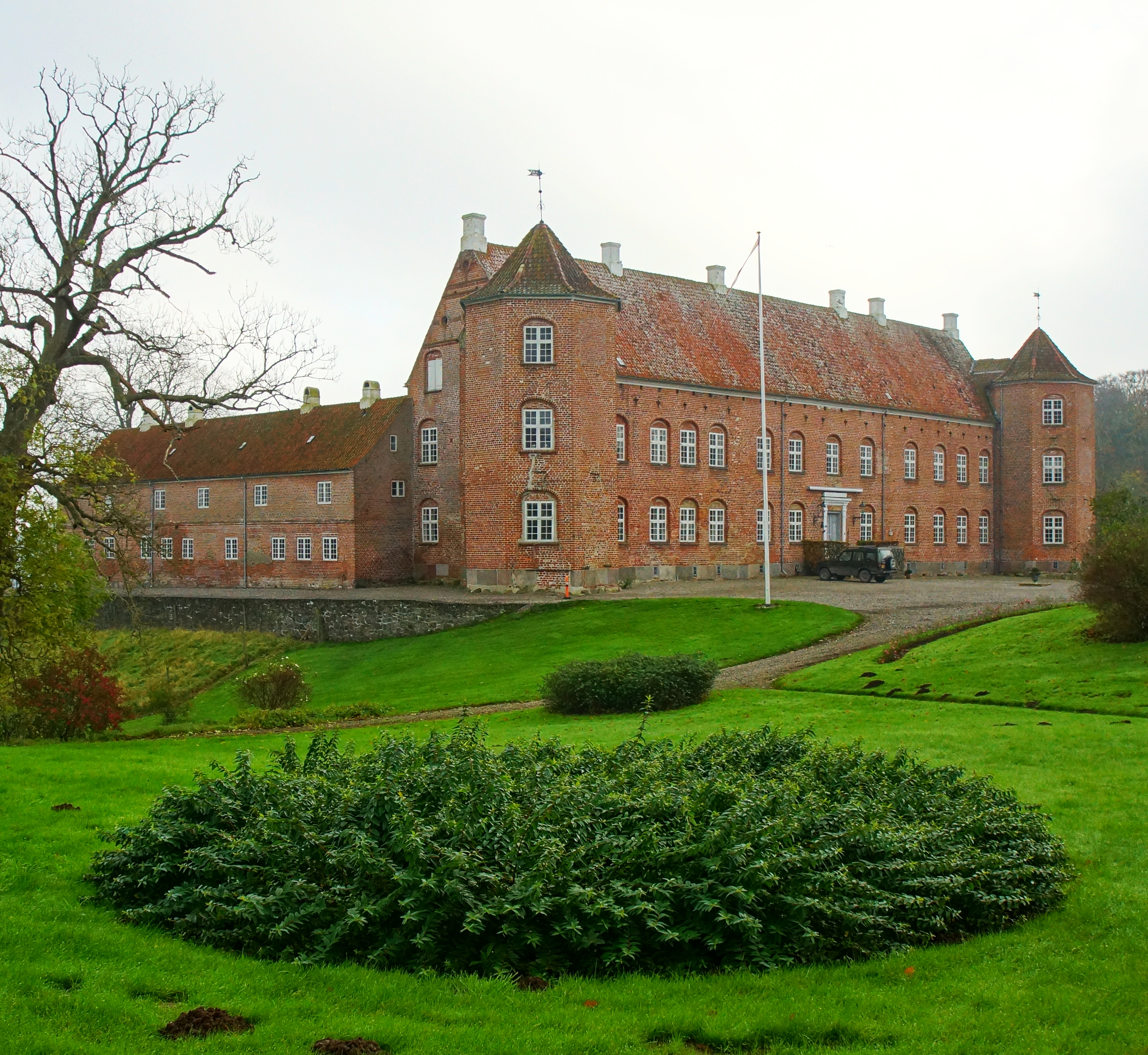
- Rugaard castle in Denmark.

- Location within Denmark

General information
- Architectural style: Renaissance
- Location: Syddjurs Municipality, Denmark
- Coordinates: 56°17′45″N 10°48′25″E
- Construction started: 1579
- Owner: Elisabeth Mourier-Petersen and sisters.

Rugaard is a rural farming and forestry castle 2 km (1.2 mi) from the eastern coast of the peninsula Djursland in Denmark bordering the sea, Kattegat between Denmark and Sweden at the entrance to the Baltic Sea in Scandinavia. The estate includes some 600 hectares of land farmed by external partners. Rugaard also has about 350 hectares of forest and 40 hectares of lakes. All in all 965 hectares. Part of Rugaard's income comes from rentals, including 32 houses and five farms.

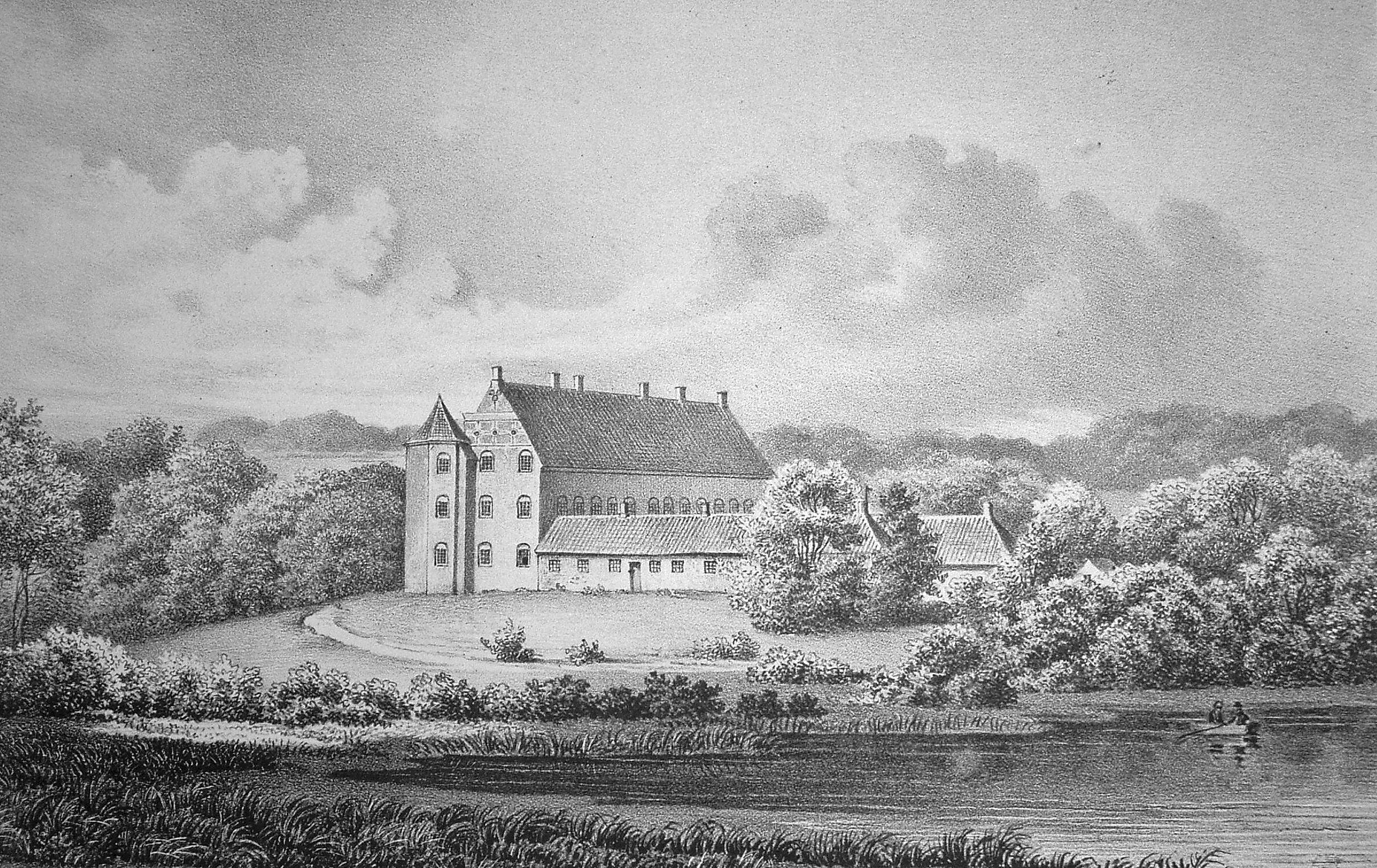
Rugaard c. 1860 from the east across Nørresø, direction towards Kattegat

== History ==
Rugaard was founded in 1579 when the nobleman Hans Axelsen Arnfeldt bought land from the crown including farms in the villages Attrup, Rosmus, Balle, Hyllested and Rove. The estate was driven through villeinage. The castle is located at the top of a slope down to the lake, Nørresø, with an easterly view of the lake and the Kattegat. Nørresø and a southerly lake, Søndersø, are former sea coves, that became lakes when the land rose after compression from ice age sheets ceased 10,000 years ago.

== Geology ==
Rugaard is located on the rim of the last ice age sheet that ended 12,000 – 14,000 years ago. The ice sheet had expanded from the Baltic Area progressing to the north stopping in the Rugaard area. Rugaard's northern lands where created by melt water flows from the ice sheet, depositing a stony sand- and gravel-mix, whilst the southern part consists of clay-rich and fertile land that lay under the ice-sheet. Rugaard is owned by four Mourier-Petersen sisters, daughters of Chr. Mourier-Petersen, who died in 1982. The estate is run by the oldest of the four sisteres, Elisabeth Mourier-Petersen, and her husband Henning Madsen.

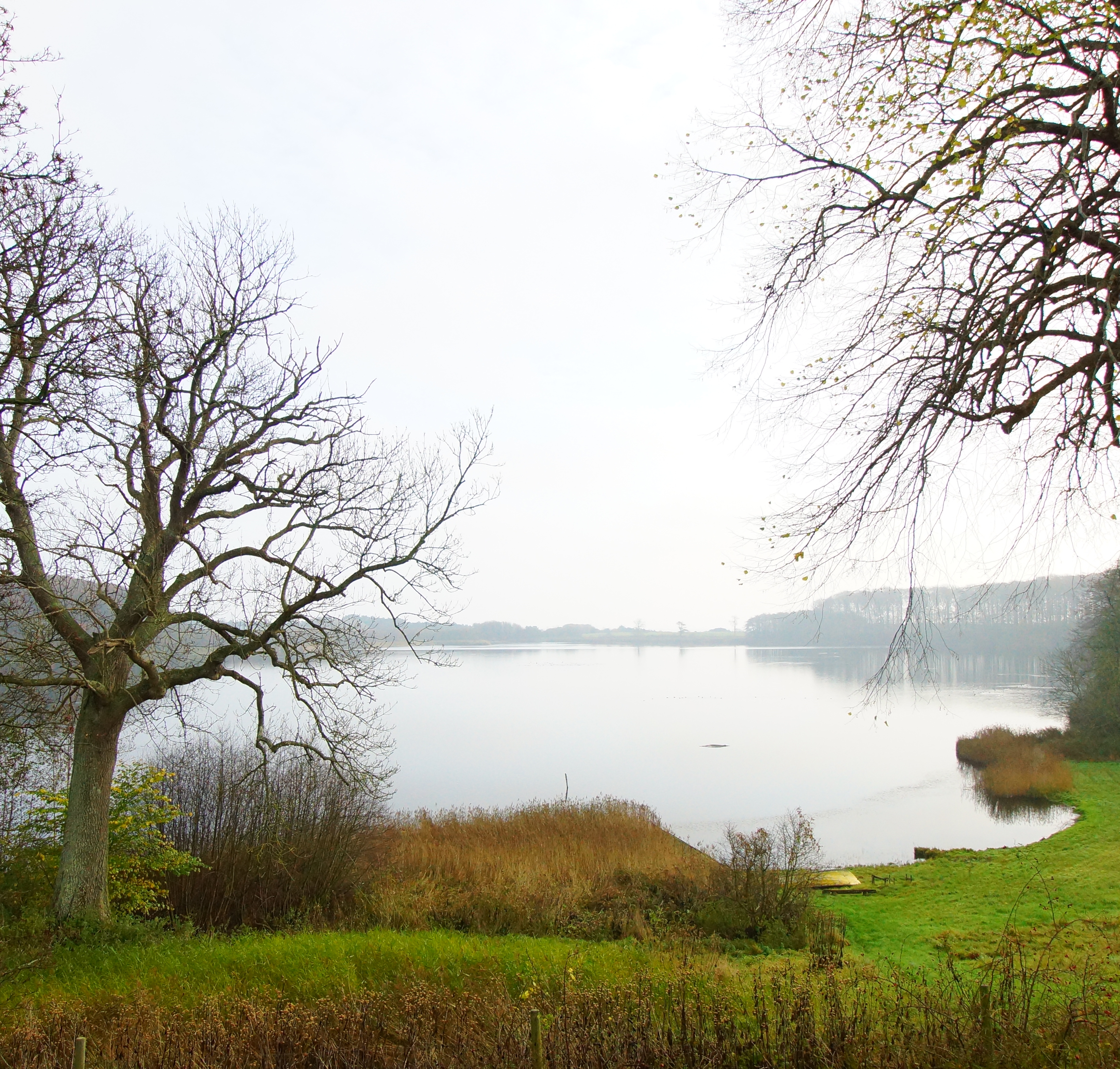
View from the castle looking east over Nørresø towards the Kattegat

== Witch hunts ==
One of the owners, Jørgen Arenfeldt, made Rugaard infamous, as a centre of the last big witch hunts in Denmark, that also spawned a chain of witch trials in eastern Jutland in 1686. Amongst other things Jørgen Arenfeldt subjected the suspects to the "water test", where the accused where thrown into the moat at Rugaard, with their hands and feet tied. If they sank, they were innocent; if they floated it was seen as a sign of guilt, after which a likely outfall would be burning at the stake.

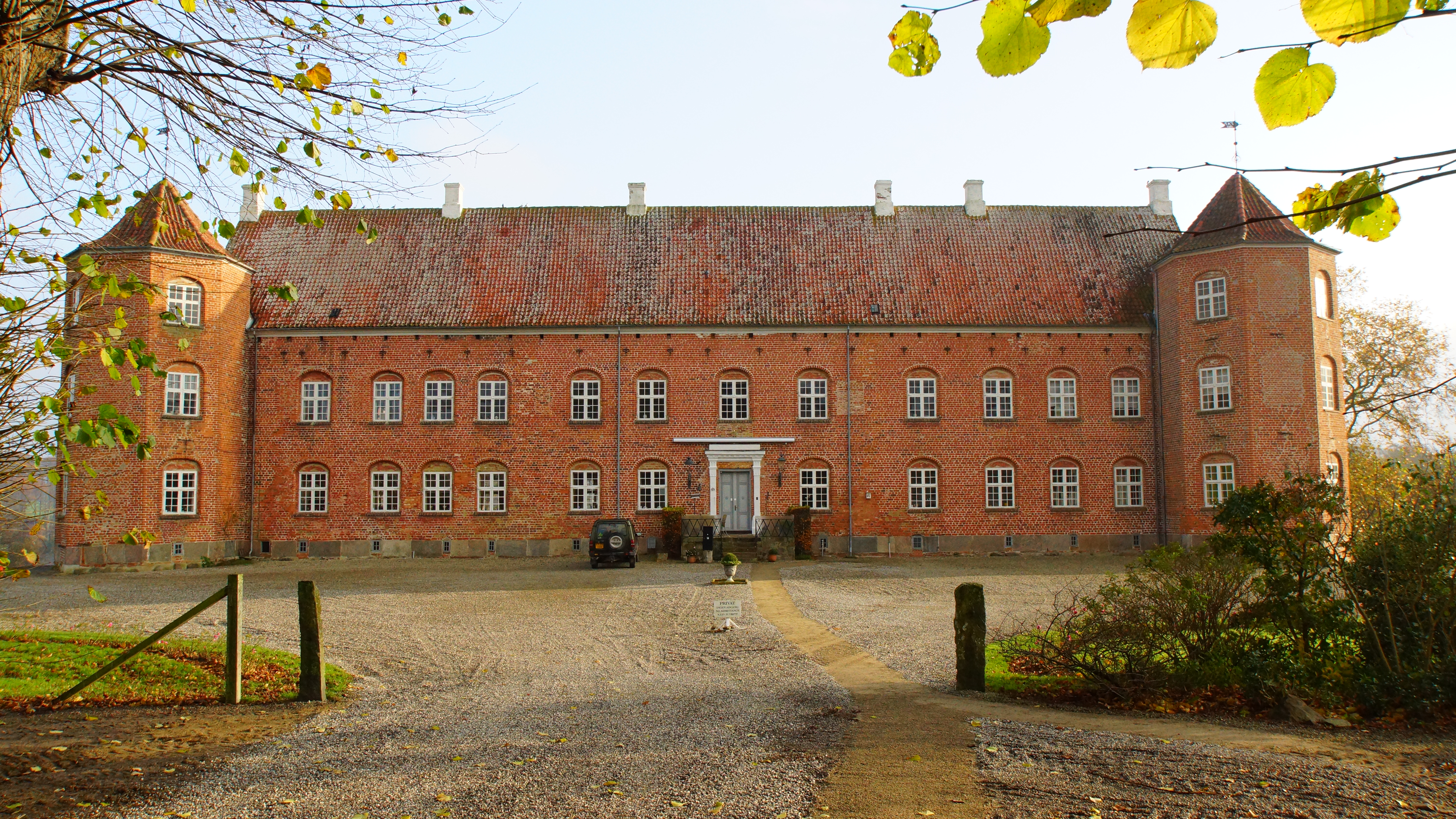
Rugaard is a farming and forestry castle.

Jørgen Arenfeldt's witch hunts, trials and executions, including burning at the stake, finally backlashed. The 28-year-old Anne Sørensdatter and her mother where accused of witchery, based on rumors of clairvoyance. When Anne Sørensdatter was interrogated as to which witches she was in alliance with, she named some powerful and wealthy citizens in the neighboring towns, Ebeltoft, Grenaa and Aarhus. These citizens responded to the accusations by accusing Jørgen Arenfeldt of bringing forth false indictments, derived from the illegal use of torture. This was tried at the Danish Supreme Court. Jørgen Arenfeldt lost and was sentenced to pay a considerable fine for defamation. At the same time he was deprived of the authority to issue private sentences. Anne Sørensdatter avoided being burnt at the stake, but was sentenced to flogging and was exiled, for her "untruthful accusations against honest and well reputed people".

== Later developments ==
The process made the Supreme Court aware of the excesses at Rugaard. It was decided that no witch could be sentenced without the case first being tried at the Supreme Court. This helped put an end to the deeds of people like Jørgen Arenfeldt. The last witch burning at the stake in Denmark took place on the Danish island of Falster in 1693, seven years after the case against Anne Sørensdatter. Jørgen Arenfeldt did not fare well with his estates, the last of them being Rugaard, which he had to give up in 1707. He moved to the town Ebeltoft close by, where he died in 1717, apparently in extreme poverty.

His oldest son, Axel Arenfeldt took over Rugaard, but did not fare well as a squire. In 1737 Rugard was put up for auction, ending a 150 year Arenfeldt-era at Rugaard. In the following 150 years Rugaard had various owners. One of them, Jacob Benzon, had the moat surrounding the manor filled. Jacob Benzon also began establishing the many stone dykes that can still be seen at Rugaard today.

In 1800 Hans Peter Ingerslev became the owner of Rugaard. He partly drained the lake, Søndersø, for farming purposes,(reestablished recently) and sold land to smallholders, thereby ending villeinage. In Ingerslev's time, that lasted until 1830, Rugard was a model estate. In 1857 Rugaard was bought by Ferdinand Mourier-Petersen, the first owner in the current line of Mourier-Petersen-owners at Rugaard.

Ferdinand Mourier-Petersen was not only seen as a competent squire, who added land to Rugaard, planted forest on the stony grounds to the north, and kept the buildings in good order. He also contributed to society on a local and national level. He was chairman of the parish council and member of parliament. But first and foremost Ferdinand Mourier-Petersen was co-founder and chairman of, Hedselskabet (1866) a national movement with the purpose of transforming infertile heath-land, primarily in Jutland, to farmland. This post he held until his death in 1898. He worked in close cooperation with the director and agitator at Hedeselskabet, Enrico Dalgas. It is said that the two men supplemented each other well. A monument in the park north of the manor commemorates Ferdinand Mourier-Petersen's effort in forestation and the conversion of heathland to farmland. His son, Adolph Mourier-Petersen, took over Rugaard after his father, and also contributed to the work at Hedeselskabet. In 1941 he completed the drainage of Søndersø. After Adolph Mourier-Petersens death in 1950, his son Christian Mourier-Petersen took over. Christian Mourier-Petersen died in 1982, after which his four daughters have been owners of the estate through a limited partnership. As of 2014 the estate is run by Elisabeth Mourier-Petersen and her husband, Henning Madsen. According to tradition Hyllested Hunting Association has a lease to the hunting rights to northern Hyllested Bjerge. Apart from that there is very little hunting on the estate.

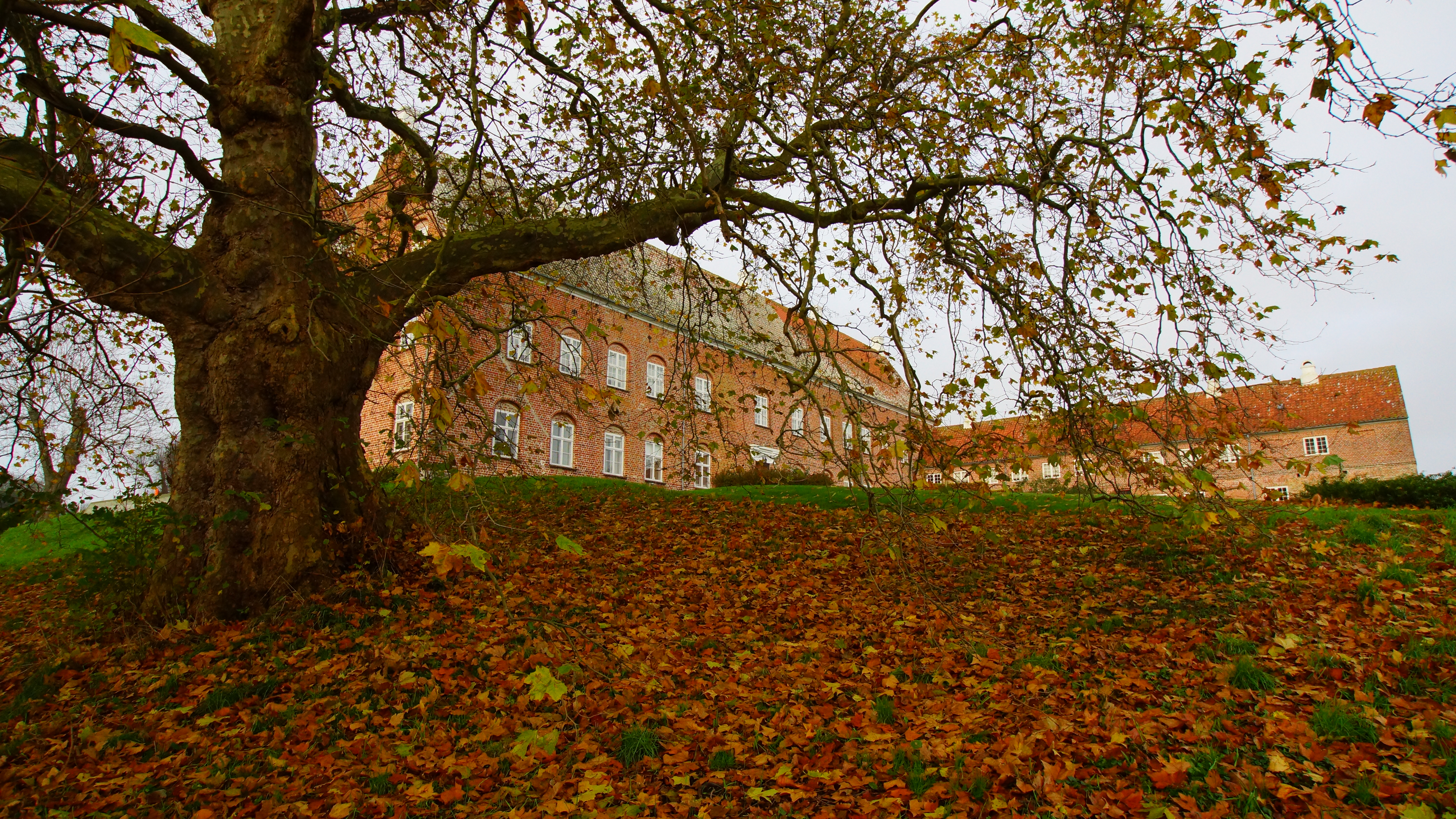
Rugård Castel is placed up from an incline by the lake, Nørresø. - here seen from south-east.

Teglgaarden at Rugaard Beach was a brickyard established in the 1890s. In the 1960s a campsite was established at Teglgaarden. It was leased to an external partner for many years. 10 km north of Rugaard up the coast of Djursland lies another castle, Katholm. Gravel quarries on Rugaards northern grounds border the same quarries on Katholms southern grounds.

Rugaard Castle lies in a hilly and forest covered landscape with lakes bordering the sea and can be seen as idyllic and holding substantial natural values. Birds of prey not seen many other places sometimes inhabit this part of the rural eastern countryside of Djursland.

== Rugaard owners ==
- (1183–1536) Øm Kloster
- (1536–1579) Kronen
- (1579–1610) Hans Axelsen Arenfeldt
- (1610–1625) Jørgen Hansen Arenfeldt
- (1625–1671) Mogens Hansen Arenfeldt
- (1671–1682) Hans Mogensen Arenfeldt
- (1682–1707) Jørgen Hansen Arenfeldt
- (1707–1719) Axel Jørgensen Arenfeldt
- (1719–1737) Vincents Lerche
- (1737–1743) Christian Lerche
- (1743–1775) Jacob Benzon
- (1775–1788) Christian Benzon
- (1788–1796) Jacob Hansen
- (1796–1798) Peter Bech
- (1798–1800) Hans Peter Ingerslev / Hans Peter Stochmann
- (1800–1830) Hans Peter Ingerslev
- (1830–1835) Caspar Peder Rothe Ingerslev
- (1835–1857) Mads Johan Buch Schiøtt
- (1857–1898) Peter Paul Christian Ferdinand Mourier-Petersen
- (1898–1904) Alvilda Dahl gift Mourier-Petersen
- (1904–1950) Adolph Mourier-Petersen
- (1950–1967) Christian Mourier-Petersen
- (1967–1982) K/S Rugaard Gods v/a Christian Mourier-Petersen
- (1982–) K/S Rugaard Gods v/a Elisabeth Mourier-Petersen married Madsen / Annette Mourier-Petersen married Seidel / Ida Mourier-Petersen married Christensen / Astrid Mourier-Petersen

== Sources ==
This article draws on the following sources:

- J.P. Trap: Danmark 4. udgave,
- Vilfred Friborg Hansen: ”Rugaard indtil 1982”
- Lisbeth Mourier-Petersen and Henning Madsen: ”Rugaard efter 1982”, both in ”Folk og Liv 2012”, Boggalleriet Rønde 2012.
- Kjeld Hansen: ”Til ingen verdens nytte blev Søndersø tømt”, i ”Folk og fortællinger”, 2011.
- Gustav Henningsen: Heksejægeren på Rugaard. 1991.
- Sydddjursportalen.dk
