= Marselisborg (manor) =

Coordinates: 56.1396°N 10.2005°E

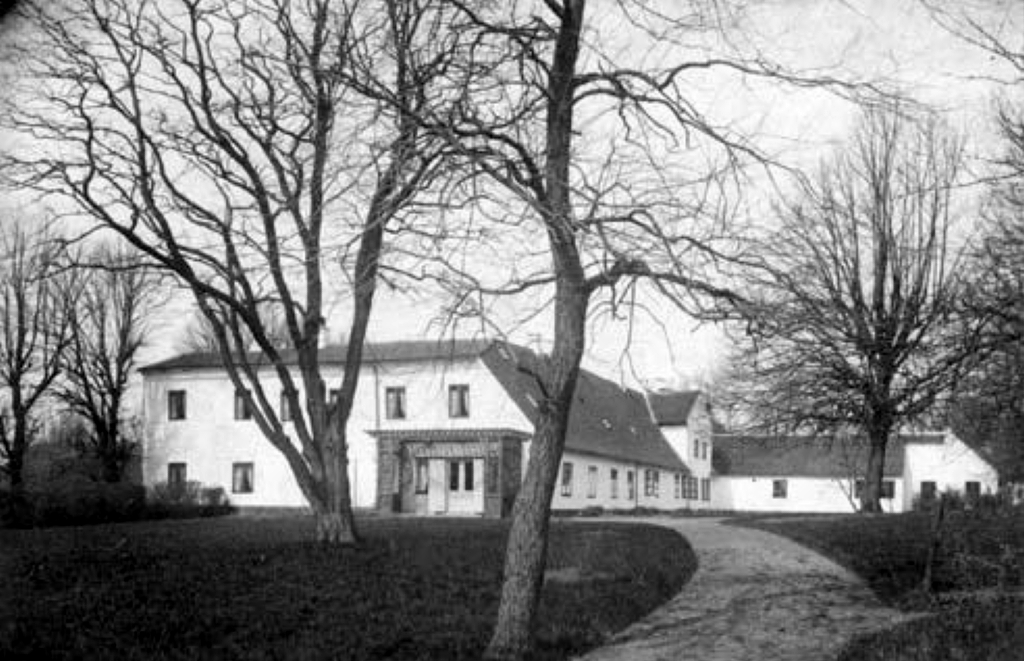
- Marselisborg Manor seen from the garden, 1896
- Interactive map of the Marselisborg area

General information
- Location: Aarhus Municipality, Denmark
- Completed: c. 1773
- Demolished: 1910

Technical details
- Floor count: 1

Marselisborg was a farm, manor and barony in Aarhus, Denmark which existed through the 1200s to 1910 under varying ownership and status. The original farm was situated in the present day Marselisborg neighborhood south of the city centre. In 1896 the city of Aarhus purchased the manor and in 1911 dissolved the estate and sold the land off for development. The manor was named after and by Gabriel Marselis who was the first private owner and many landmarks in the area are in turn named for the manor such as Marselisborg Forests, Marselisborg Hospital and Marselisborg Palace.

== History ==
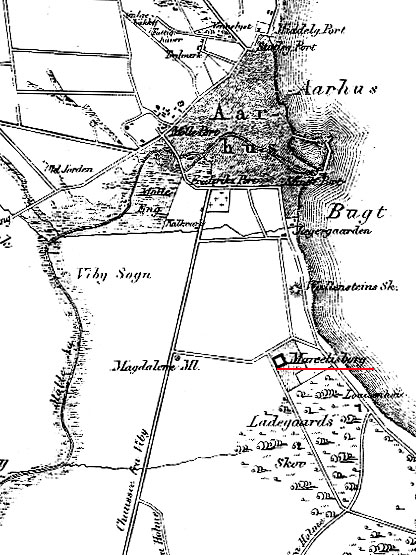
Map of the Marselisborg estate c. 1846

The original Havreballegaard farm can be traced to the 1200s when it was the property of the Diocese of Aarhus. However, in 1536 the reformation in Denmark was concluded and all church property was confiscated by the Crown. In 1544 it was owned by the king who incorporated it with his other estates in the area. When absolute monarchy was enacted in 1660, the system of fiefs was reorganized and Havreballegård came in private ownership.

The first private owner was the Dutch merchant Gabriel Marselis who was given the manor and lands by King Frederik III as repayment for debts incurred by the Crown during the Second Northern War. Gabriel Marselis did not move to Denmark himself but his sons would later assume control of his estates there. Constantin Marselis took over the manors Havreballegaard and Stadsgård in 1673. Marselis made Stadsgård his home and renamed it Constantinsborg. In 1684 he was made a Danish baron and Havreballegård was elevated to the barony Marselisborg (Lit. Marselis' Castle). Constantin Marselis died childless and the manor changed hands a number of times until the 1860s when Hans Peter Ingerslev purchased it and became the last private owner.

In the 1890s, Frederiksbjerg was almost fully developed and Aarhus city council negotiated with Ingerslev, then Danish Minister of the Interior, to purchase the manor and associated lands. Ingerslev owned both the manor and the forests on the hills south of it. The negotiations were successful and on 18 April 1896 Ingerslev signed the preliminary agreement for the sale of the manor and most of the estate, with options for the rest. Ingerslev died two days later but the city honored the agreement and bought both the manor and the forests. The municipality initially operated the farm as a business and developed the land piecemeal, most notably Marselisborg Palace and the 32 acres (130,000 m^{2}) palace garden in 1898. However, the farming operation suffered several fires and it was decided to dissolve the manor and subdivide its lands for development. In 1911, the main building was demolished.

== Buildings ==
In the 1570s Frederik II (1534-1588) decided to build a grain magazine at the manor Aarhusgaard but abandoned the plans in 1576. The building materials were instead transferred to Havreballegård and the seignory there instructed to build a new main building for the manor for the future use of the king. The result was a large stone building surrounded by moats and ramparts.

However, during the Thirty Years' War (1618-1648) Jutland was occupied by enemy troops and Havreballegård was greatly damaged. Subsequently, the manor was only scantily repaired due to financial difficulty. Less than 10 years later, during the Second Northern War (1657-1660), occupation by Swedish forces again damaged the buildings. In 1756 the manor house was still only a modest half-timbered building and owners still preferred to live elsewhere. When Christian Rudolph Philip Gersdorffs owned Marselisborg a new primary building was finally erected since the old one could not be repaired. The new building was in 3 wings in Neoclassical style. Aarhus Municipality took ownership of the manor in 1896 and it was torn down in 1910.

== Owners ==
From	To	Owner
	1536	Diocese of Aarhus
1536	1661	The Danish State
1661	1673	Gabriel Marselis
1673	1699	Constantin Marselis
1699	1719	Ulrik Christian Gyldenløve
1719	1770	Frederik Danneskiold-Samsøe
1772	1800	Christian Rudolph Philip Gersdorff
1800	1802	Nicolaus Maximilian Gersdorff
1802	1805	Christian C.N. Gersdorff
1805	1825	Frederik Julius Christian Gyldenkrone
1825	1832	Christian A. Gersdorff
1832	1835	H. Rothe
1832	1864	Caspar Peder Rothe Ingerslev
1864	1896	Hans Peter Ingerslev
1896	1902	Aarhus Municipality
1902	...	Danish royal family
