= Constantin Marselis =

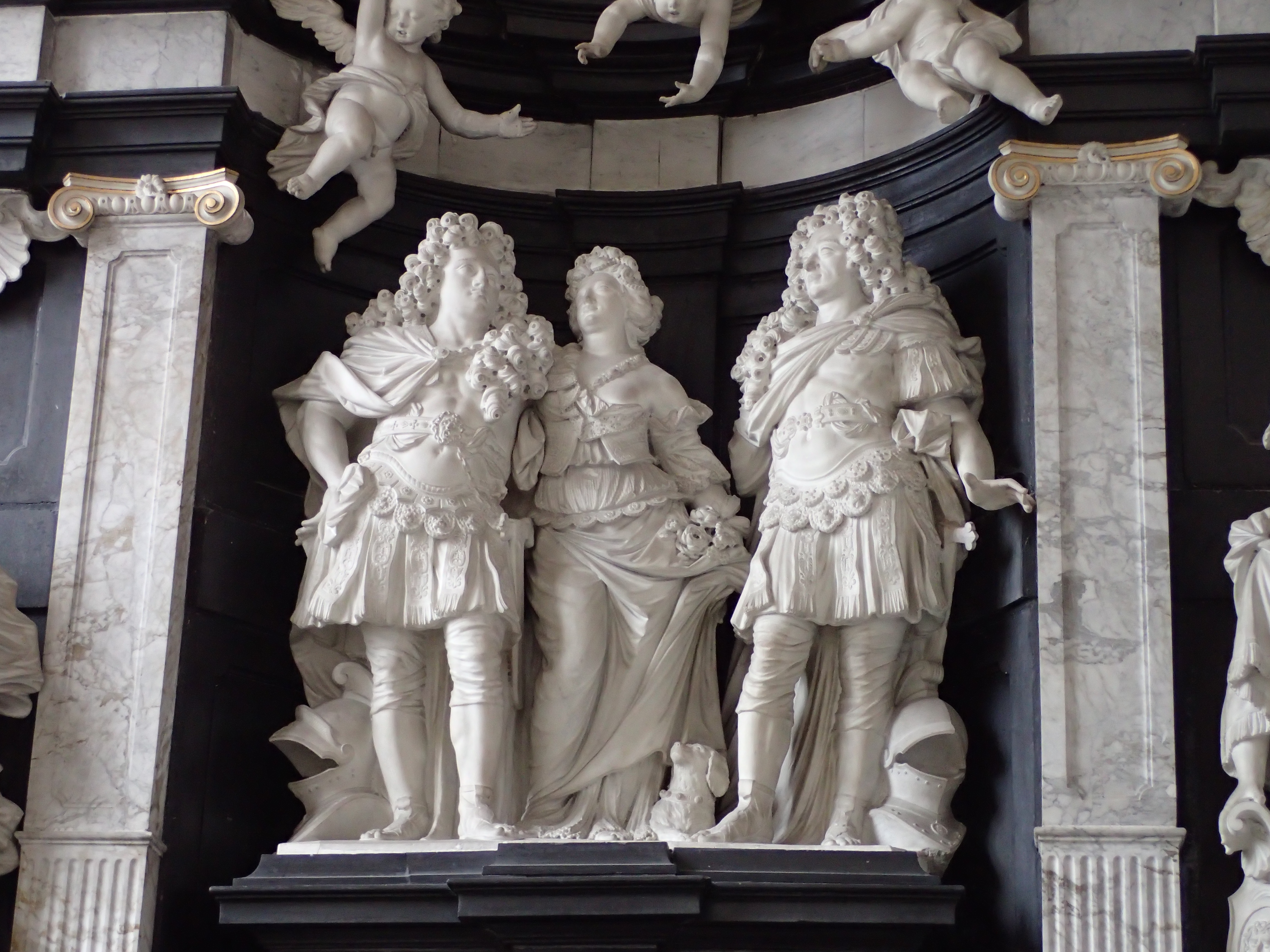
Constantin Marselis in an epitaph with his wife Sophie Charisius and her later husband Peter Rodsteen. From Aarhus Cathedral, made by Thomas Quellinus.

Constantin Marselis, or Constantijn Marselis (28 November 1647 – 16 June 1699), was a nobleman of the wealthy Dutch Marselis family.

== Biography ==
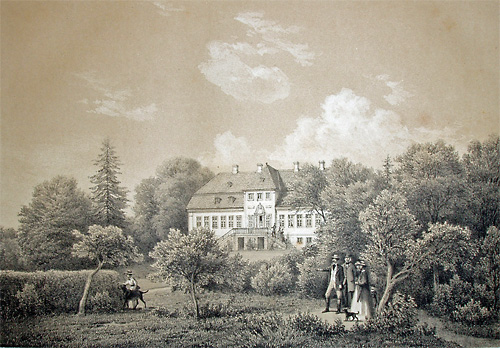
Painting from 1861 of the manor house of Constantinsborg

Constantin Marselis was born in Amsterdam as the younger son of Gabriel Marselis (1609–1673) and Isabeau van Straaten. He had an elder brother Vilhelm Marselis (1643-1683) who was fief baron of Güldencrone.

In 1667, the King of Denmark Frederik III sent for both Constantin and Vilhelm, to take over two of their father's Danish estates near Aarhus; Stadsgård and Havreballegård. At the same time, they were appointed as Junkers of the Danish court. In 1668 they were appointed as Kammerjunkers.

Shortly after the King's death in February 1670, Constantin Marselis married Sophie Elisabeth Charisius (1647-1706). He and his wife took residence on Stadsgård. After years of neglect from his father and damages from the constant wars with Sweden in the Second Northern War, Constantin renovated Stadsgård extensively. When the manor was finished in 1677, he renamed it to Constantinsborg, a name it retains to the present.

In 1680, he became a baron of the Havreballegård estate just south of Aarhus and at the same time renamed the manor Marselisborg. Constantin died childless in 1699, and the barony of Marselisborg went to the Crown.

After his death, his widow Sophie initiated a sepulchral for him, herself and her new husband Peter Rodsteen in the Aarhus Cathedral and a richly decorated epitaph can be seen here today.

== Constantinsborg ==
Constantinsborg Manor house is situated just south of the new lake of Årslev Engsø, a few kilometres west of Aarhus. It is still a manor for the Constantinsborg Estate and is currently owned by the Holch Povlsen family. The estate is part of the Global Gap certified food production company De 5 Gaarde (lit.: The 5 Farms), in collaboration with four other Danish Estates.

== Other Sources ==
- Harris, Poul: Marselis-slægten, blade af dens historie Viby J, Centrum 1980. (in Danish)
- Lauridsen, John T.: Marselis konsortiet: En studie over forholdet mellem handelskapital og kongemagt i 1600-tallets Danmark Aarhus, Jysk Selskab for Historie 1987 (disputats). (in Danish)
- Jensen, Bernhardt og Peder Jensen: Marselisborgskovene Aarhus, Universitetsforlaget Aarhus 1974. (in Danish)
