= Ellis Marsalis Sr. =

American businessman

- Born: Ellis Louis Marsalis; April 16, 1908; Summit, Mississippi, U.S.
- Died: September 19, 2004 (aged 96); New Orleans, Louisiana, U.S.
- Occupation: Businessman
- Years active: 1927–1982
- Spouse: Florence Robertson
- Children: Ellis Marsalis Jr.
- Relatives: Marsalis family

Ellis Louis Marsalis Sr. (April 16, 1908 – September 19, 2004) was an American businessman from New Orleans, Louisiana. He was a former poultry farmer turned hotelier, Esso franchise owner and civil rights activist.

== Family ==
Marsalis was born in Summit, Mississippi, the son of Rosa (née Gayden) and Simeon "Simmie" Marsalis. His father had changed his surname to "Marsalis", his stepfather's surname. He was the patriarch of the renowned Marsalis musical family that includes his son, Ellis Marsalis Jr., and grandsons Wynton, Branford, Delfeayo, and Jason. Ellis Sr. was married to Florence Robertson (Marsalis), and also has a daughter, Yvette Marsalis, of New Orleans. Marsalis was never a musician of any kind, but was fond of Mississippi Delta Blues.

== Early life ==
Marsalis came to New Orleans in 1927 and worked for the Duplain Rhodes Funeral Home, driving a horse-drawn hearse. During World War II, he did welding and built batteries to aid the war effort.

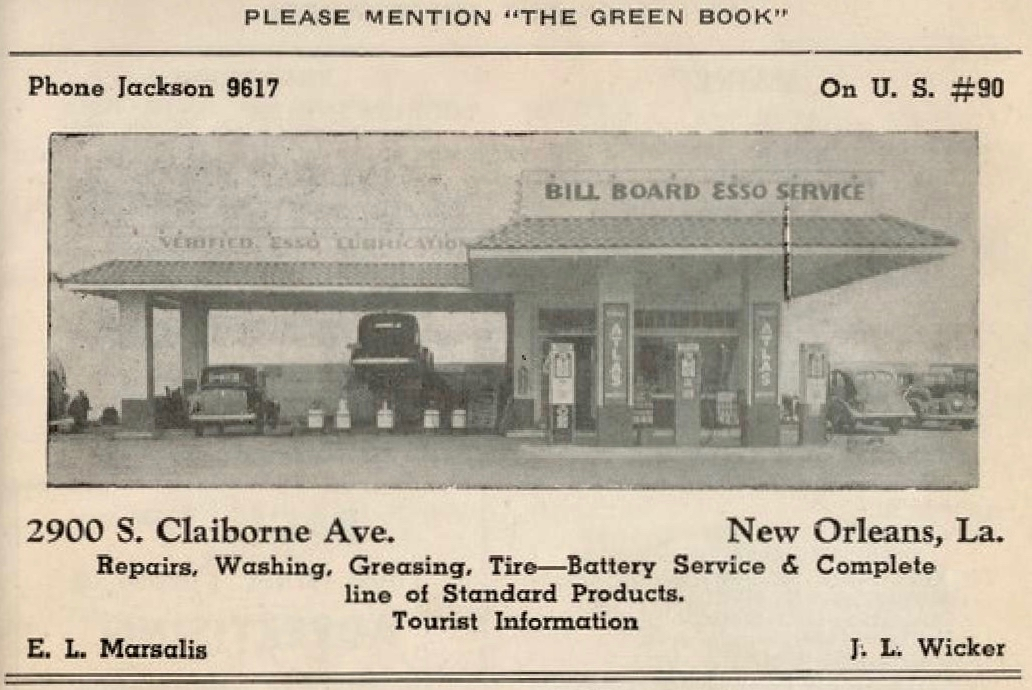
Ad for Marsalis run service station in 1941 Negro Motorist Green Book

== Hotelier ==
In 1943, Marsalis converted a barn on the shore of the Mississippi River into the Marsalis Motel. It catered to African-Americans, who were not allowed to stay at "whites only" New Orleans establishments under Jim Crow—the South's segregation laws. The hotel and restaurant quickly attracted prominent musicians, such as Ray Charles, Cab Calloway, Ruth Brown, Etta James, Dinah Washington, and others, as well as some of the most influential civil rights leaders of the day, including Martin Luther King Jr., Adam Clayton Powell Jr. and Thurgood Marshall. He was also elected President of the Nationwide Hotel Association, an organization of Southern Black hotel owners (such as Ferdinand Prout, A.G. Gaston, and Louis Mason) that he co-founded in 1963 in an effort to increase the economic power of their businesses.

== Achievements ==
Marsalis was the first Black businessman to obtain an Esso (now Exxon) franchise in the state of Louisiana, co-owning (with William Wicker) and operating an Esso service station on the corner of what is now Claiborne and Louisiana Avenues in New Orleans. He was also the first black businessman to own a successful business in Jefferson Parish (Metairie/Shrewsbury), Louisiana. He was a lifelong member of the Republican Party, and was a delegate to the Republican Convention of 1964. He assisted David Treen's successful 1982 campaign for Governor of Louisiana.

Marsalis was instrumental in the voter registration of Black residents of Jefferson Parish from 1951 to 1966. He helped finance the education of Ernest Nathan Morial ("Dutch"), the first Black student to attend the Louisiana State University Law School, who later became the first black mayor of New Orleans. Marsalis also played a role in the election of Judge Lionel Collins, the first Black Judge of the 24th Judicial District Court, in Gretna, Louisiana.

== Later ==
The achievements of the Civil rights movement led to a decline in trade at the Marsalis Motel when hotels and motels began to accept anyone as a guest regardless of color. Marsalis's Mansion (Motel) closed on 25 September 1986, and it was demolished in July 1993. The property was sold in July 2006. On January 9, 2015, the Jefferson Parish Historical Society erected an historical plaque on the former motel site, honouring Marsalis for his contributions to Jefferson Parish life and to the Civil rights movement.
