= Peter Rodsteen =

Danish nobleman, government official and landowner

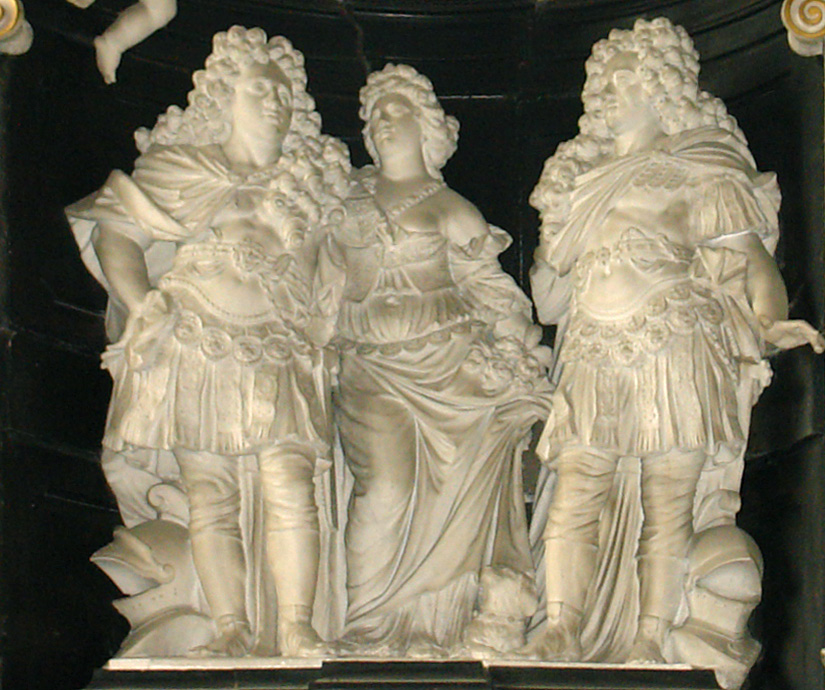
Rodsteen's wife flanked by her two husbands. Epitaph in Aarhus Cathedral.

Peter Rodsteen (22 June 1662 – 22 October 1714) was a Danish nobleman, government official and landowner. He served as diocesan governor of Aalborg and president of the Danish Admiralty. In 1703, he was created Baron of Constantinsborg.

== Early life and education ==
Rodsteen was born on 22 June 1662 to naval captain Markor Rodsteen (1625–81) and Dorothe Sehested (1637–64).

== Career ==
In 1686, Rodsteen entered court service as page (hofjunker) for Prince Christian. In 1689, he was promoted to kammerjunker. From 1685 he also worked as secretary in Danske Kancelli. In 1707, he was appointed diocesan governor of Aalborg and county governor of Aalborghus County. In 1712, he left these posts to assume the post as President of the Danish Admiralty.

== Personal life and legacy ==
On 22 February 1703, Rodsteen married Sophie Elisabeth Charisius (1647–1706). She had until then served as Maid of the Bedchamber for Princess Frederica Amalia of Denmark. She was the widow of baron Constantin Marselis (1647–1699). Her parents were county governor Peder C. til Palstrup (1608–85) and Anne de Binde (1623–80). Her first husband had owned the estate Stadsgård at Aarhus. In 1703, she established the so-called stamhus (entailed property) Constantinsborg from the estate. In connection with their wedding, Rodsteen was created a baron.

In 1681, Rodsteen had inherited the estates Lerbæk and Nørre Elkær from his father. In 1687, he bought the farm Langholt. In the same year, he also acquired Sejlstrup from the Crown but sold it again two years later.

In 1712, Rodsteen was created a White Knight and awarded the title of Gehejmeråd. He died on 22 October 1714 and is buried in Aarhus Cathedral. An epitaph in the church by Thomas Quellinus features a sculpture group of Rodsteen's wife flanked by her two husbands.
