= Marsalis =

Marsalis is a surname. Notable people with the name include:

== Arts and entertainment ==
=== Music ===
- Branford Marsalis (born 1960), American saxophonist, composer and bandleader
- Delfeayo Marsalis (born July 28, 1965), American jazz trombonist and record producer
- Ellis Marsalis Jr. (1934–2020), American jazz pianist
- Jason Marsalis (born 1977), American jazz drummer
- Wynton Marsalis (born 1961), American trumpeter and composer

=== Other media ===
- Amanda Marsalis, American film director and photographer

== Other people ==
- Ellis Marsalis Sr. (1908–2004), American businessman
- Jim Marsalis (born 1945), American football player
- John H. Marsalis (1904–1971), American politician
- Thomas Marsalis (1852–1919), American developer

== See also ==
- Marselis, surname
- Marcellus (name), given name and surname
