= Marselisborg Palace =

Coordinates: 56°7′40.16″N 10°12′10.00″E

- Marselisborg Slot
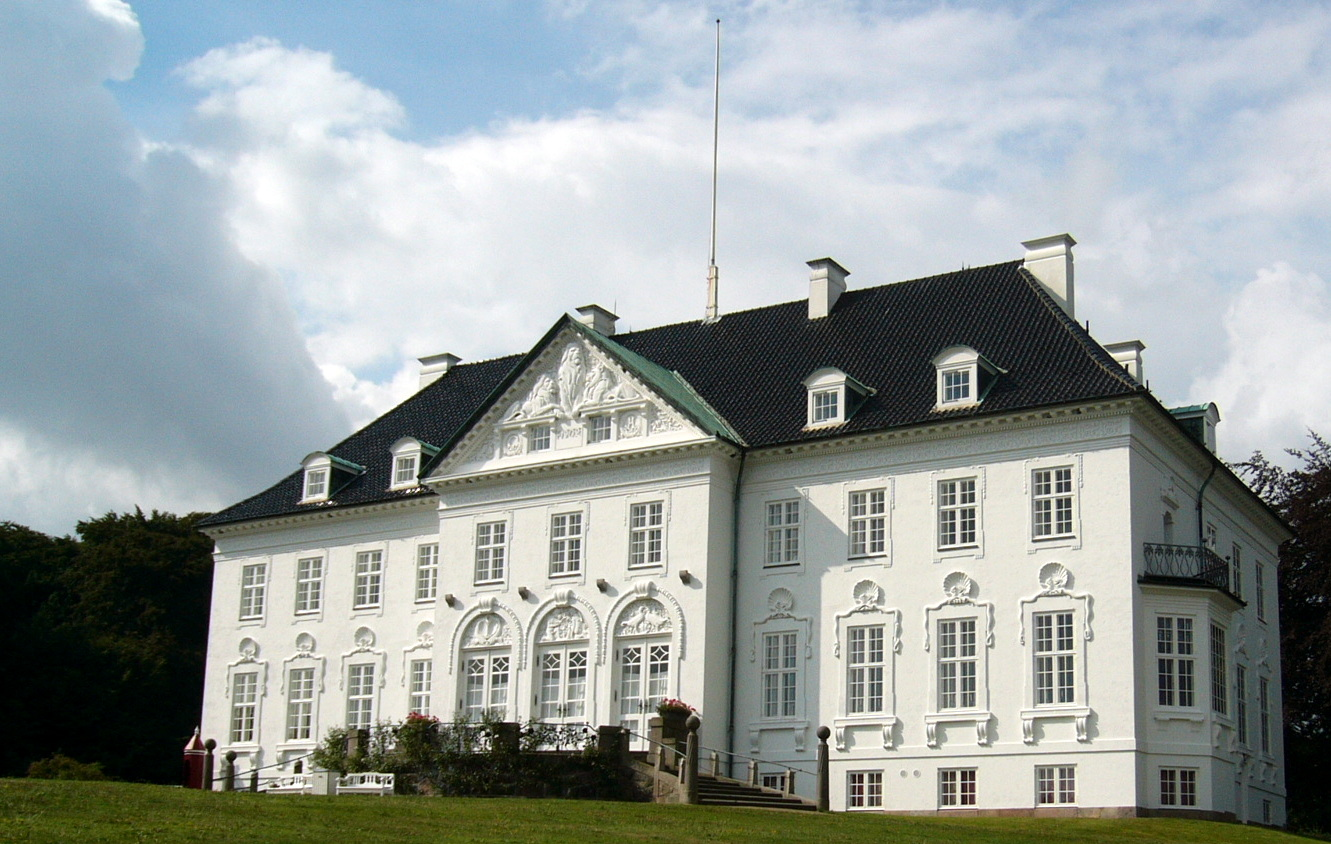
- Marselisborg Palace
- Interactive map of the Marselisborg Palace area

General information
- Type: Palace
- Location: Aarhus, Denmark
- Construction started: 1899
- Completed: 1902
- Cost: kr 150,000
- Client: Aarhus City Council

Design and construction
- Architect: Hack Kampmann
- Engineer: Charles Ambt (City engineer of Copenhagen)

Marselisborg Palace (Danish: Marselisborg Slot, Danish pronunciation: [mɑˈse̝ːlisˌpɒˀ]) is a royal residence of the Danish royal family in Aarhus. It has been the summer residence of Queen Margrethe II since 1967.

There is a Palace Park in connection to the palace itself and outside the grounds, stretching to the coast of the Bay of Aarhus is another large park Mindeparken (The Memorial Park), popular with the citizens of Aarhus for recreational activities in the warmer months of the year. Just south of Marselisborg Palace is Aarhus Forestry Botanical Garden and a Deer Park, as part of the extensive Marselisborg Forests. Just west and north of the palace is Aarhus Racecourse and the Atletion Stadium.

== History ==
Designed by architect Hack Kampmann, Marselisborg Palace was built in 1899–1902 on the land of the old Marselisborg Manor and was presented as a gift from the people of Denmark to the royal family, on the occasion of the wedding of Prince Christian and Duchess Alexandrine of Mecklenburg-Schwerin. The couple later became King Christian X and Queen Alexandrine and initiated the tradition of using the palace as a summer residence. The palace is the property of the Kingdom of Denmark, and will remain in possession of all future monarchs of Denmark.

The former Queen, Margrethe II, was given the palace by her father, King Frederik IX in 1967. Margrethe and her consort Henrik also used the palace as their summer residence. To this day the residence is used during the summer, as well as during the Easter and Christmas holidays.

=== About the name ===
The name Marselisborg refers to the old barony manor Marselisborg. Marselisborg means "Marselis Castle" in Danish and it was located where Marselisborg Gymnasium have residence now. The manor dates back to the 1500s and was originally named Havreballegård, but in the 1600s the German-Dutch merchant Gabriel Marselis, replaced the name with the more grandiose "Marselis Castle". The Municipality of Aarhus took ownership of the Marselisborg estate in 1896, including the manor house. The manor house caught fire several times in the early 1900s and does not exist anymore. The only relation to Marselisborg Palace is the name Marselisborg and the fact that the palace was erected on land formerly part of the Marselis estate.

=== A gift from the people ===
The palace is "a gift of the people", in the sense that the project was funded by individual financial contributions and built on land given by the Municipality of Aarhus. Several jutlandic cities and Danish companies became involved in the project, when the palace was equipped and furnished later on and in return their respective coat of arms are now presented throughout the palace building. Among the contributors are the cities of Vejle, Horsens, Randers, Aalborg, Thisted and Nykøbing Mors, to name just a few. The fundraising was initiated in the autumn of 1897 by prefect Dreyer, baron J. Rosenkrantz of Sophiendal and landowner Chr. Neergaard of Aakjær.

== The Palace Park ==
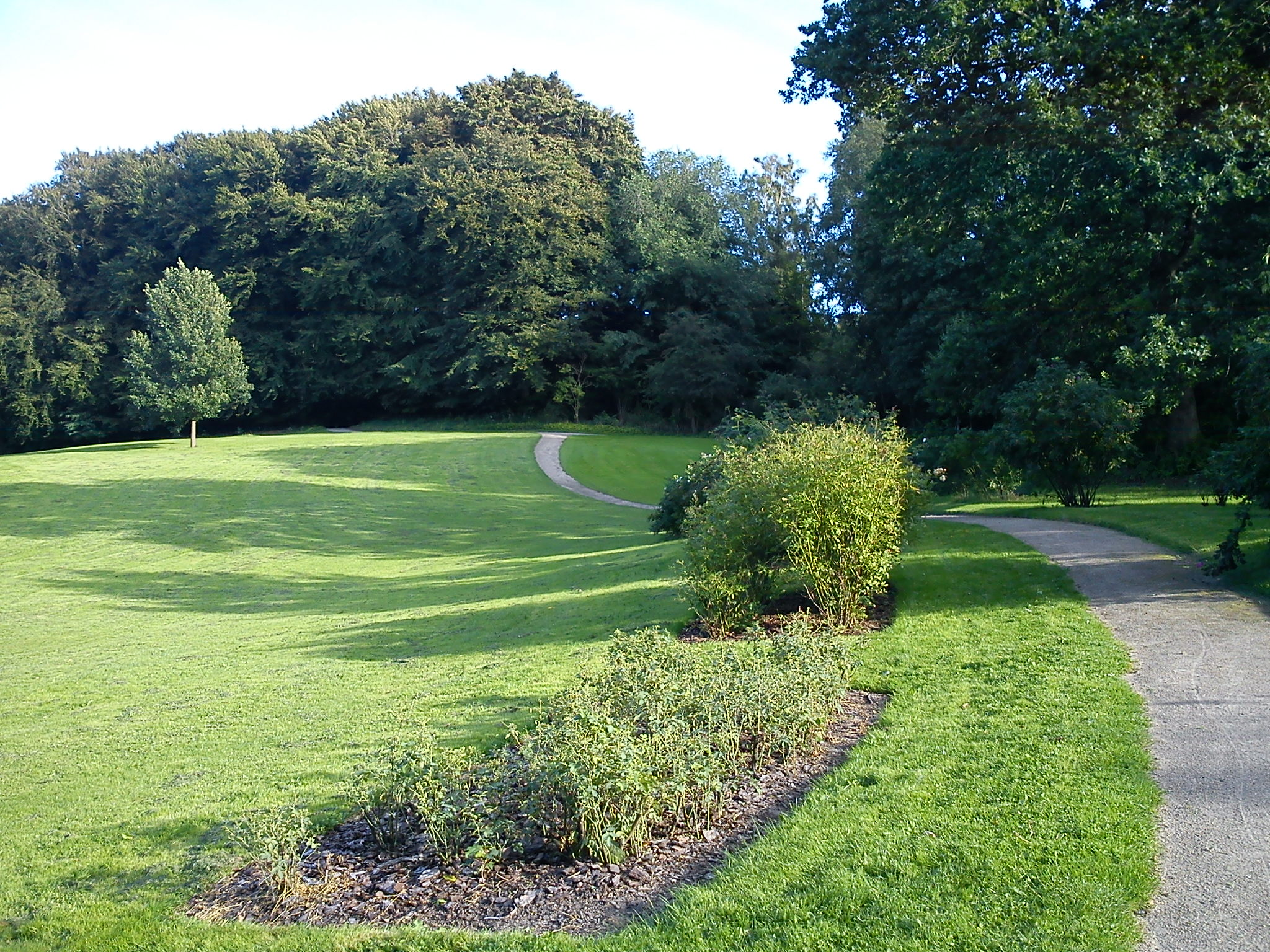
The Palace Park

The palace is situated in a 32-acre (130,000 m^{2}) park known as Slotshaven (The Palace Park). The park was designed by architect L. Christian Diedrichsen in traditional English landscape style, featuring large sweeping lawns dotted with small ponds, clusters of trees and shrub-covered slopes. There is a rose garden and a herb garden and the landscape is dotted with art sculptures. The park and gardens are both open to the public while the Queen and royal family are not in residence, whereas the palace itself is never open to the public. When the royal family is in residence, a changing of the guard ceremony takes place at noon. The main gates are the only entrance and exit to the palace and the park.

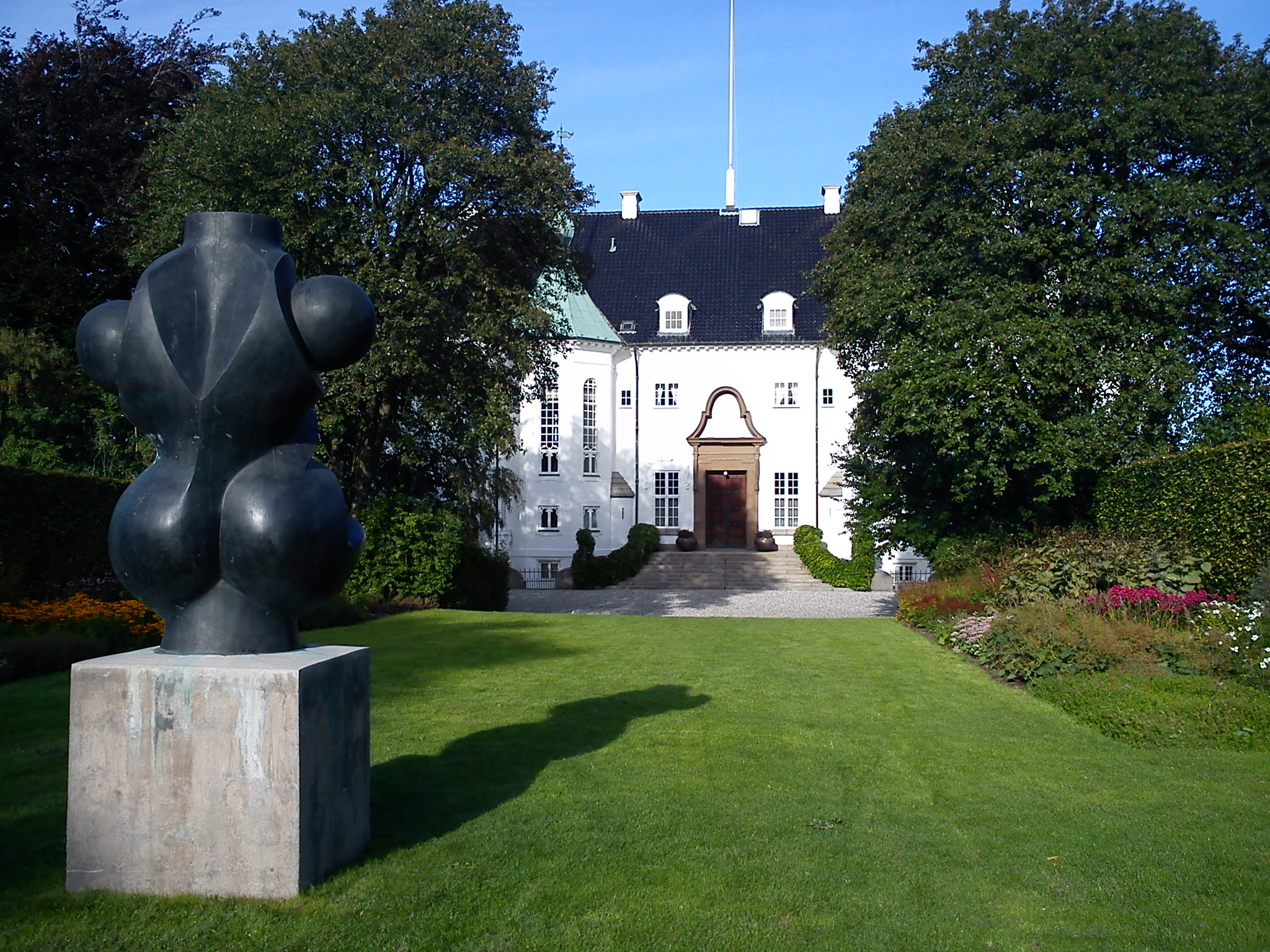
Marselisborg Palace, main entrance.

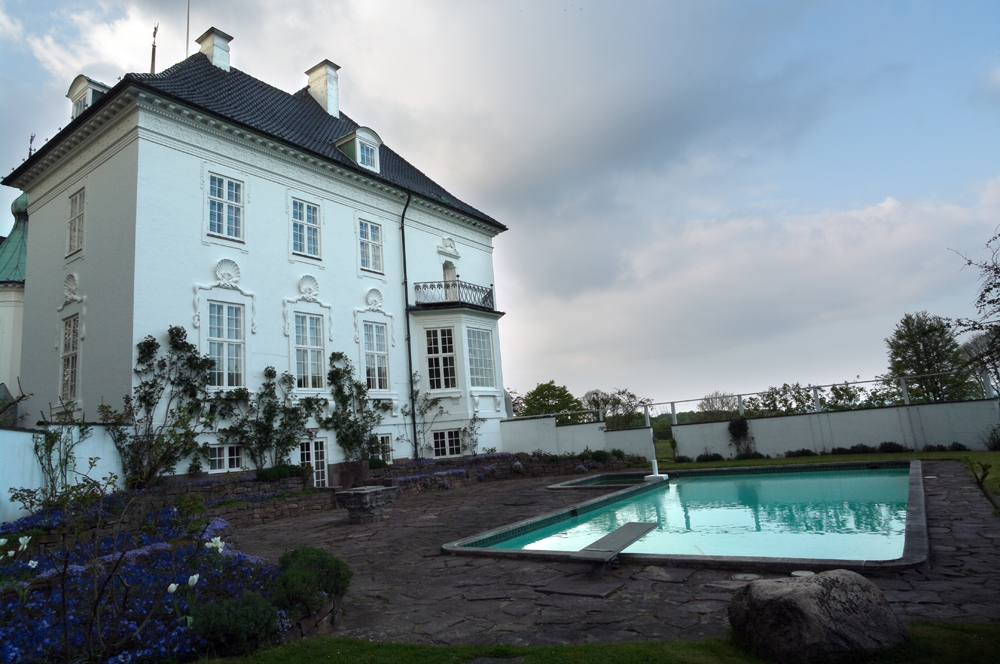
At the palace grounds.

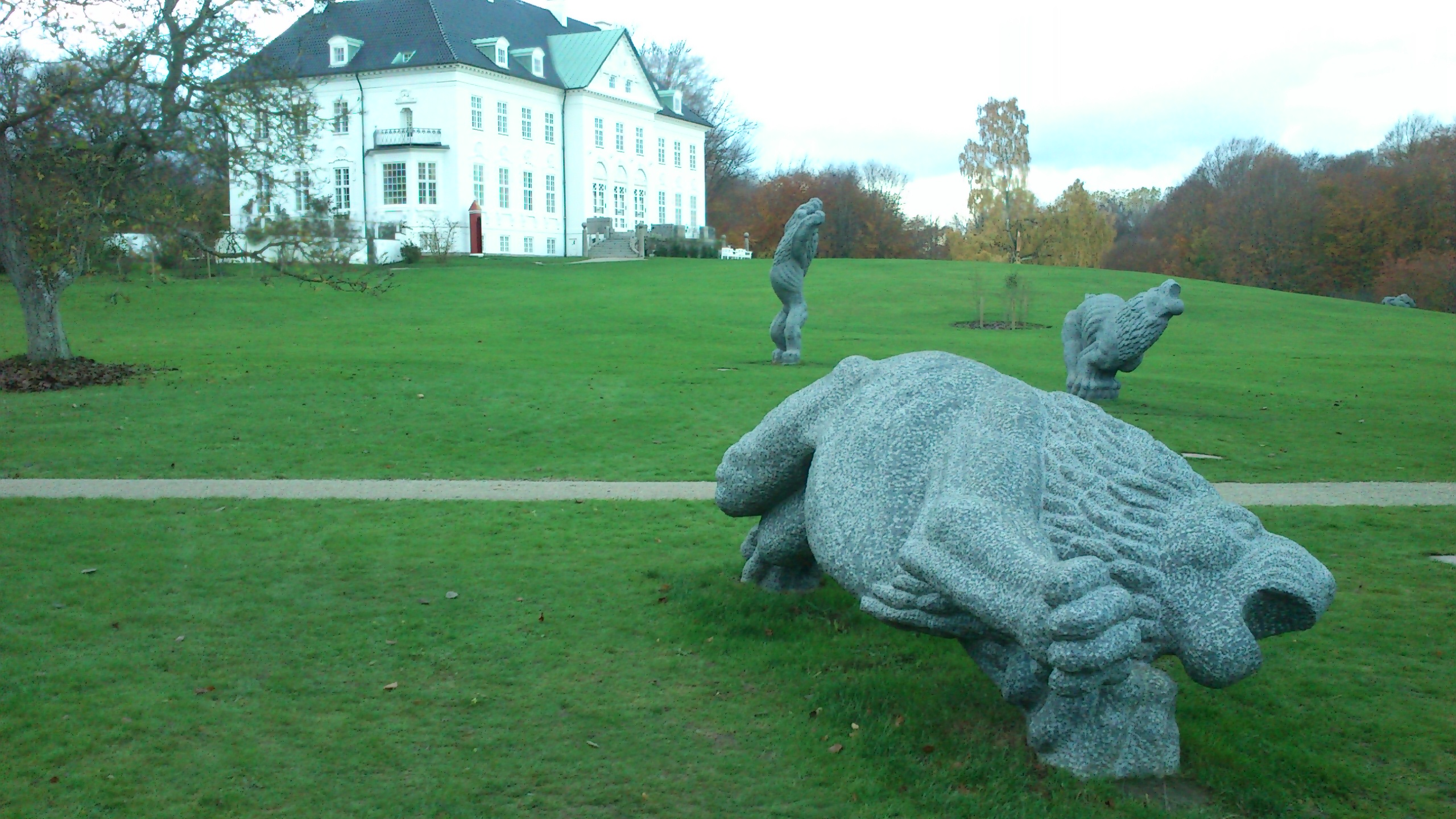
Granite sculptures from The Palace Park.

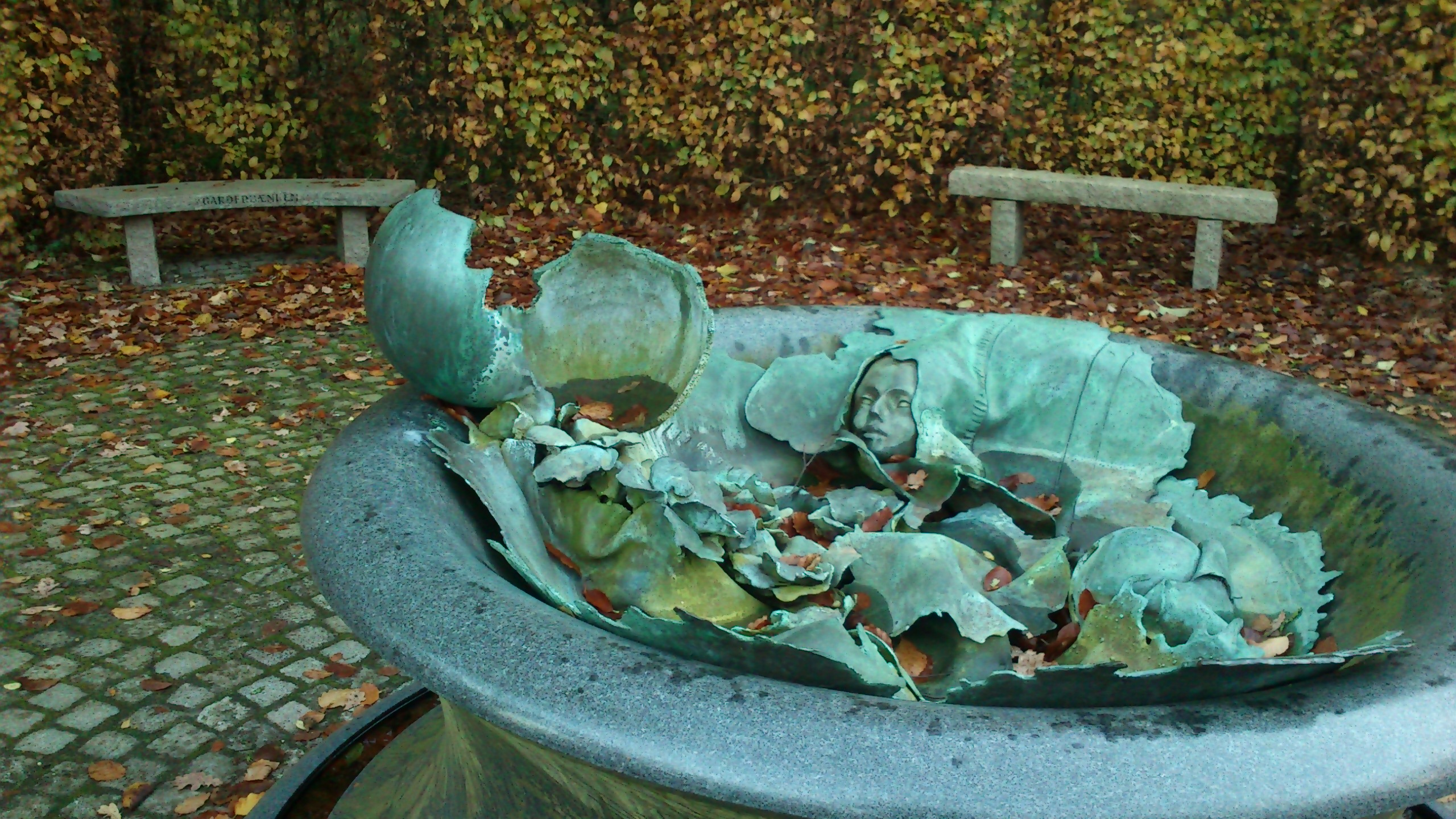
Bronze- and water-sculpture from The Palace Park.
