= Jutland Racecourse =

Public racecourse in Aarhus, Denmark

- Jydsk Væddeløbsbane
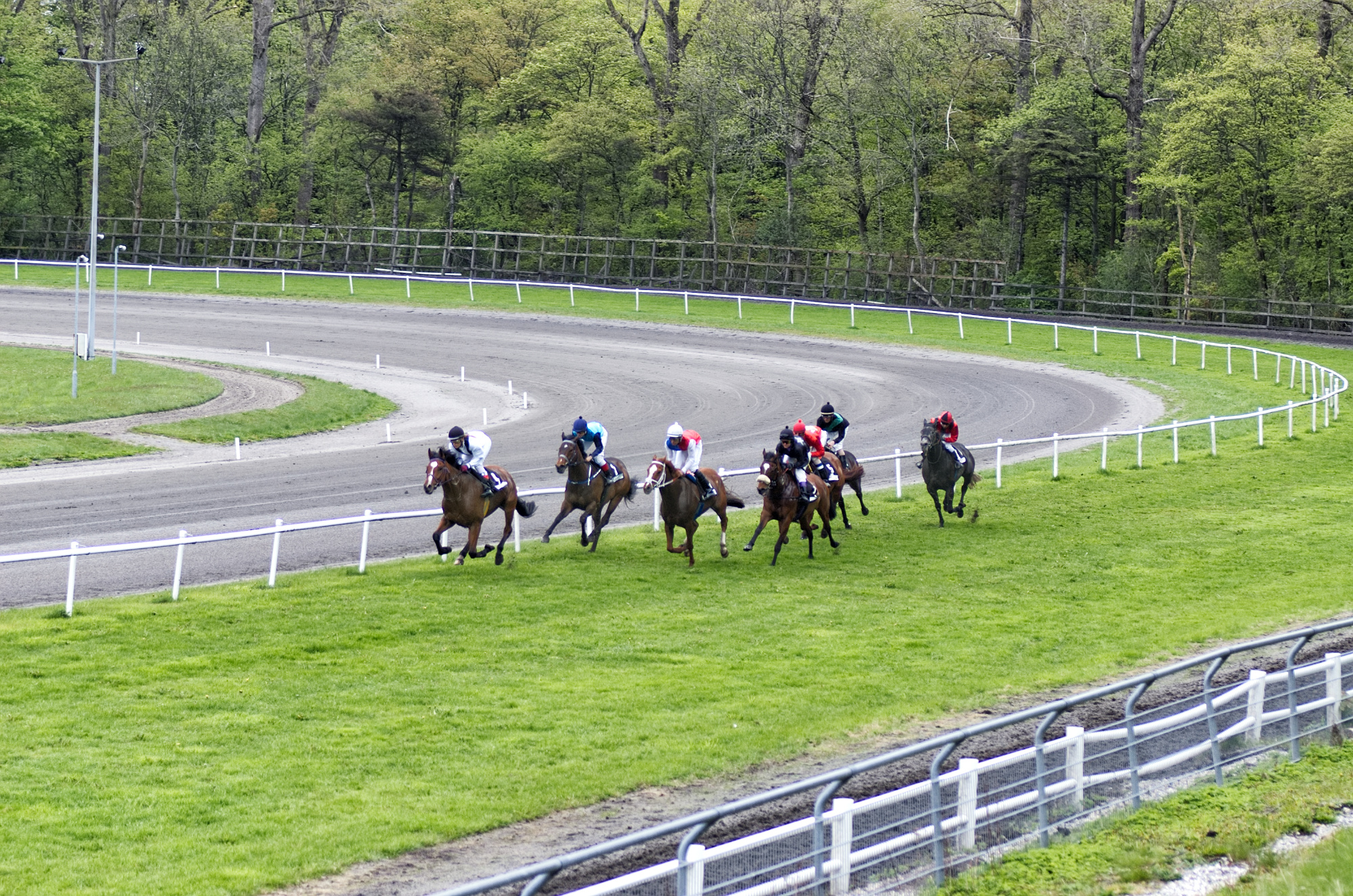
- Jutland Racecourse
- Interactive map of Jutland Racecourse
- Address: Observatorievejen 2, 8000 Århus C
- Location: Aarhus
- Coordinates: 56.1278°N 10.1959°E
- Type: Horse racing Racecourse

Construction
- Opened: 29 June 1924

Website
- Official website

The Jutland Racecourse (Danish: Jydsk Væddeløbsbane) is a public racecourse in Aarhus, Denmark. The racecourse is situated on Observatorievejen adjacent to the Aarhus Sports Park in the Aarhus C district north of Højbjerg.

== History ==
The first horse races in Aarhus were held around 1898 on Marselisborg Mark or Skejby Mark. Races were almost all gallop apart from a few exceptions in the 1910s. There was no tradition in Aarhus for horse racing and the only areas large enough to accommodate it as a spectator sport were two hilly. In April 1923 local organizations requested Aarhus city council some of the newly acquired Marselisborg estate to establish a proper racecourse for horse racing. Aarhus Stadium had been completed in the area in 1920 and a majority in the city council felt that the two facilities would complement each other. The racecourse was approved in 1924 and granted a loan of 20000 Danish Kroner and on 29 June 1924 the racecourse was inaugurated. The racecourse was initially a 1200 meter long grass lane and one lane with four fixed obstacles for steeplechase races. Additional facilities included betting booths, tribunes and a restaurant.

In the 1930s the racecourse was expanded and renovated a number of times, frequently with public funds from job creation projects initiated during the Great Depression. The first expansion took place in 1935. In 1938 the largest expansion took place and the course was evened out so the difference in height was reduced from 9 meters to 4 meters. In 1939 large concrete tribunes were built with offices and betting booths underneath and private spectator boxes.
