= Hans Peter Ingerslev =

Danish politician

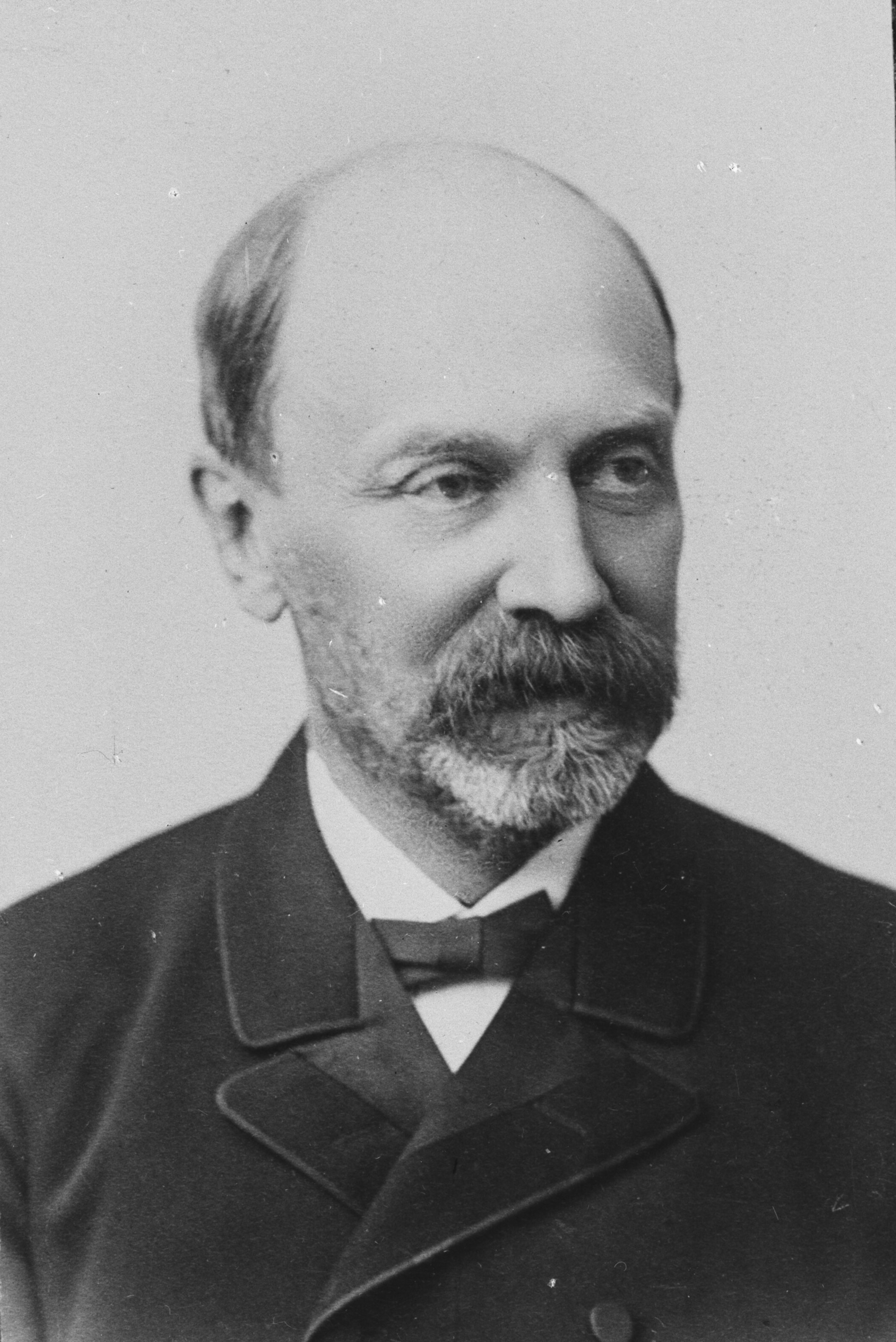
- H. C. Ingerslev
- Born: 3 May 1831; Marselisborg, Denmark
- Died: 20 April 1896 (aged 64); Copenhagen, Denmark

Hans Peter Ingerslev (3 May 1831 – 20 April 1896) was a Danish politician and minister. He was born in 1831 on Marselisborg Manor in Aarhus, owned by his parents Caspar Peder Rothe Ingerslev and Marie Meulengracht.

Hans Peter Ingerslev graduated from the Cathedral School in Aarhus in 1849 and in 1864 he inherited Marselisborg Manor from his father. He was president of Viby parish council between 1865 and 1874 and member of Aarhus County council between 1865 and 1885. In 1873, Ingerslev was elected to the Danish Folketing for Højre, a predecessor for the Conservative People's Party, and he served for two terms; from 1873 to 1876 and from 1879 to 1884. From 1884 to his death, Ingerslev served in the Landsting. From 1885 to 1896 he was Minister of the Interior.

During his tenure as Minister of the Interior, Ingerslev accomplished laws related to social services, pensions and healthcare. Furthermore, he contributed to the establishment of Freeport of Copenhagen. Shortly before he died in 1896, Ingerslev signed a sales agreement with Aarhus City Council which bought Marselisborg Manor the year after.

== Public office ==
- Interior Minister, 7 August 1885 to 15 January 1894 in the cabinet of Jacob Brønnum Scavenius Estrup.
- Minister for Public Works, 15 January 1894 to 7 August 1894 in the cabinet of Jacob Brønnum Scavenius Estrup.
- Minister for Public Works, 7 August 1894 to 20 April 1896 in the cabinet of Tage Reedtz-Thott.

== Honors ==
In Hans Peter Ingerslev's native Aarhus, the street of Ingerslevs Boulevard and the square of Ingerslev's Plads were established in 1903 and 1912 respectively and named after him, both located in the neighbourhood of Frederiksbjerg. In Copenhagen, the street of Ingerslevsgade on Vesterbro was also named for him.

In 1890, Hans Peter Ingerslev received the Grand Cross of the Order of the Dannebrog.
