= Selius Marselis =

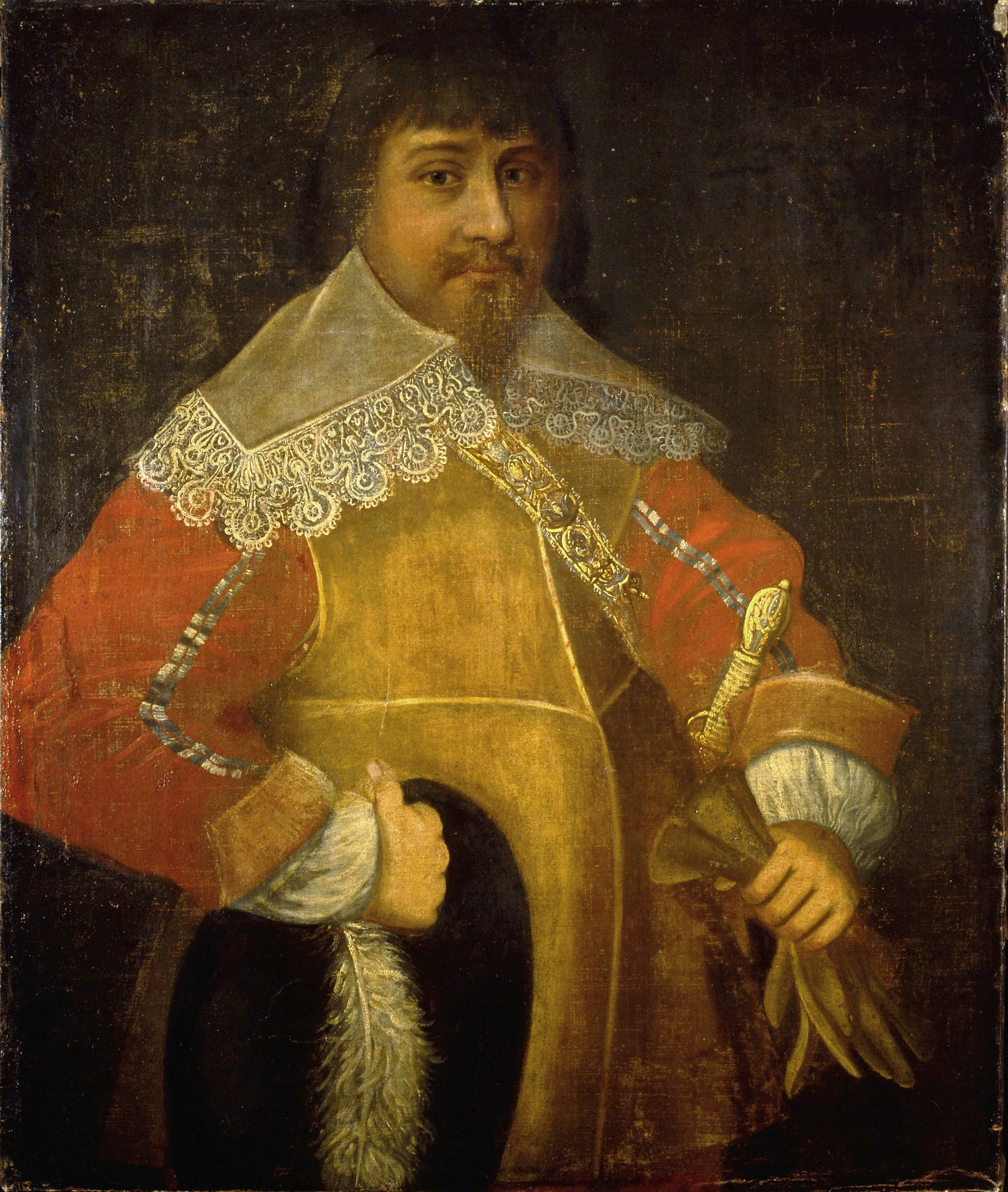
- Born: 15 December 1600; Rotterdam
- Died: 20 March 1663 (aged 62)
- Occupations: Tradesman and landowner
- Parent: Gabriel Marselis Sr.
- Relatives: Gabriel Marselis (brother)

Selius Marselis (15 December 1600 – 20 March 1663) was a Dutch-born Norwegian tradesman. He was also a major land owner whose possessions included ownership of Frogner Manor.

Marselis was born in Rotterdam, the son of merchant Gabriel Marselis Sr. (c. 1575–1643). He was the brother of Gabriel Marselis and Leonhard Marselis. Along with his brothers he brought his father's trading company in 1631 and traded in grain, weapons, copper and lumber. He settled in Christiania (now Oslo) in 1644 after he was granted a number of special privileges. He had contracts for delivering several ships to the Danish–Norwegian fleet. He and his brother Gabriel gave the king a considerable loan and received as consideration interests in several mining operations.

From the 1640s, the brothers dominated lumber exports from Norway to the Netherlands. Marselis became director of the Norwegian Postal Service in 1653. In time, he and his brother Gabriel Marselis became the largest property owners in Norway. He was the owner of Frogner Manor in the Oslo borough of Frogner from 1659.

== Personal life ==
Selius Marselis married into one of the larger Dutch merchant families. In 1634 he married Anna van der Straaten (1608–1654), daughter of Jan Fransz van der Straaten and Sara Moncks. They were the parents of five children.
