= Gabriel Marselis Sr. =

Dutch merchant

- Born: c. 1575
- Died: 16 July 1643 (aged 67–68); Hamburg
- Occupation: Merchant
- Children: Selius Marselis; Gabriel Marselis

Gabriel Marselis (c. 1575 – 16 July 1643, Hamburg) was a Dutch merchant. He established a large trading house, based in Amsterdam and Hamburg, with connections to several royal houses in Europe.

Marselis may have been born in Antwerp to a family who escaped to the Northern Netherlands before or during the siege of that city by the Spanish in 1584/5. Around 1597 and probably in Rotterdam, Marselis married Anna L'Hermite (c.1577–1652), who was definitely from Antwerp and was related to the contemporary merchant Jacques L'Hermite. Among their sons were Selius Marselis, Gabriel Marselis, Peter Marselis and Leonhard Marselis. The family company was further developed by his sons and sons-in-law, and they eventually came to be among the largest trading family houses in Northern Europe.
