= Gaius Claudius Marcellus =

Gaius Claudius Marcellus can refer to:

- Gaius Claudius Marcellus (praetor 80 BC), Roman governor of Sicily
- Gaius Claudius Marcellus, son of Marcus Claudius Marcellus, a Catilinarian conspirator, possibly related to the consul in 50 BC.
- Gaius Claudius Marcellus (consul 50 BC)
- Gaius Claudius Marcellus (consul 49 BC)
