= Caspar Peder Rothe Ingerslev =

Danish politician, procurator and landowner

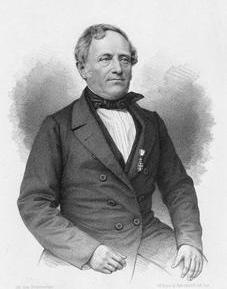
- Born: 2 August 1800; Aarhus, Denmark
- Died: 20 September 1864 (aged 64); Aarhus, Denmark

Caspar Peder Rothe Ingerslev (2 August 1800 in Aarhus – 20 September 1864 in Aarhus) was a Danish politician, procurator and landowner. He served at different times in the Folketing, Landstinget, Danish supreme court and on the advisory council to the king. He married into the wealthy Meulengracht family and fathered the future minister Hans Peter Ingerslev. Ingerslev was also active in local politics and managed the Marselisborg Manor for many years.

Ingerslev was the son of city councilor Hans Peter Ingerslev (1762–1830) and Severine Rothe Elisabeth (1773–1828). In 1828 he married Marie Meulengracht (1800–1857), daughter of Harboe Meulengracht, and 3 years later fathered Hans Peter Ingerslev (1831–1896). In 1818 Ingerslev obtained a legal degree and then worked as the custodian of Lyngbygård. In 1825 he was made procurator in Aarhus (until 1842). In 1830 Ingerslev took over his father's farm Rugård at Ebeltoft but sold it again in 1835. Ingerslev had been a co-owner since 1832 but now he bought Marselisborg Manor entirely.

Ingerslev was skilled at business and liked to work, resulting in many different public positions throughout his life. In 1840 he was a co-founder of the fire insurance company Jylland and in 1842 to 1858 he was cashier for the Aarhus County farmer's association. Since 1842 cash controller for the banks in Aarhus and a member of the County Council. 1851-1858 and 1862-1864 chairman of the representatives to Nørrejyske Kreditforening. Ingerslev was also no stranger to public and political service; he was an official delegate to the estates in Viborg in 1836-1848 and was elected to the Danish Folketing in 1853–1854. In 1862 elected to Landstinget and in 1864 to rigsrådets landsting. 1842 appointed royal advisor og 1860 justitsråd (Supreme Court).
