= Marcellus Hartley Dodge =

Marcellus Hartley Dodge may refer to:

- Marcellus Hartley Dodge, Sr. (1881–1963), chairman of the board of Remington Arms Company
- Marcellus Hartley Dodge, Jr. (1908–1930), heir to the Remington-Rockefeller fortune, son of the above
