= Cassius Marcellus Clay (disambiguation) =

Cassius Marcellus Clay (1810–1903) was an American politician and abolitionist.

Cassius Marcellus Clay may also refer to:

- Cassius Marcellus Clay Sr. (1912–1990), American painter and musician, named after the abolitionist, father of the boxer
- Muhammad Ali (born Cassius Marcellus Clay Jr., 1942–2016), American boxer
