= Pope Marcellus =

Pope Marcellus may refer to two Roman Catholic popes:

- Pope Marcellus I (saint; 308–309)
- Pope Marcellus II (1555)
