= Marselisborg =

- Neighborhood
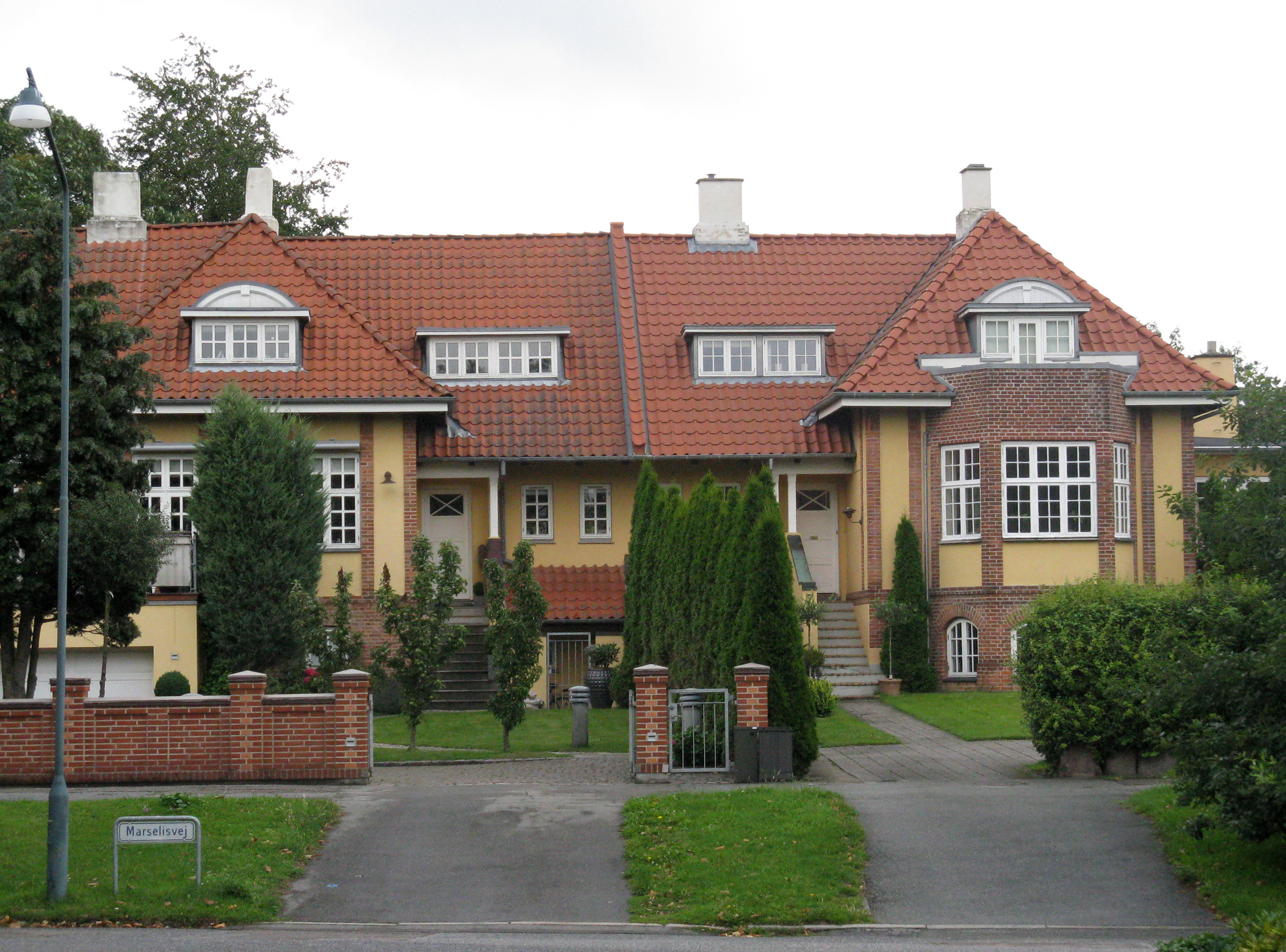
- One of many villas in Marselisborg

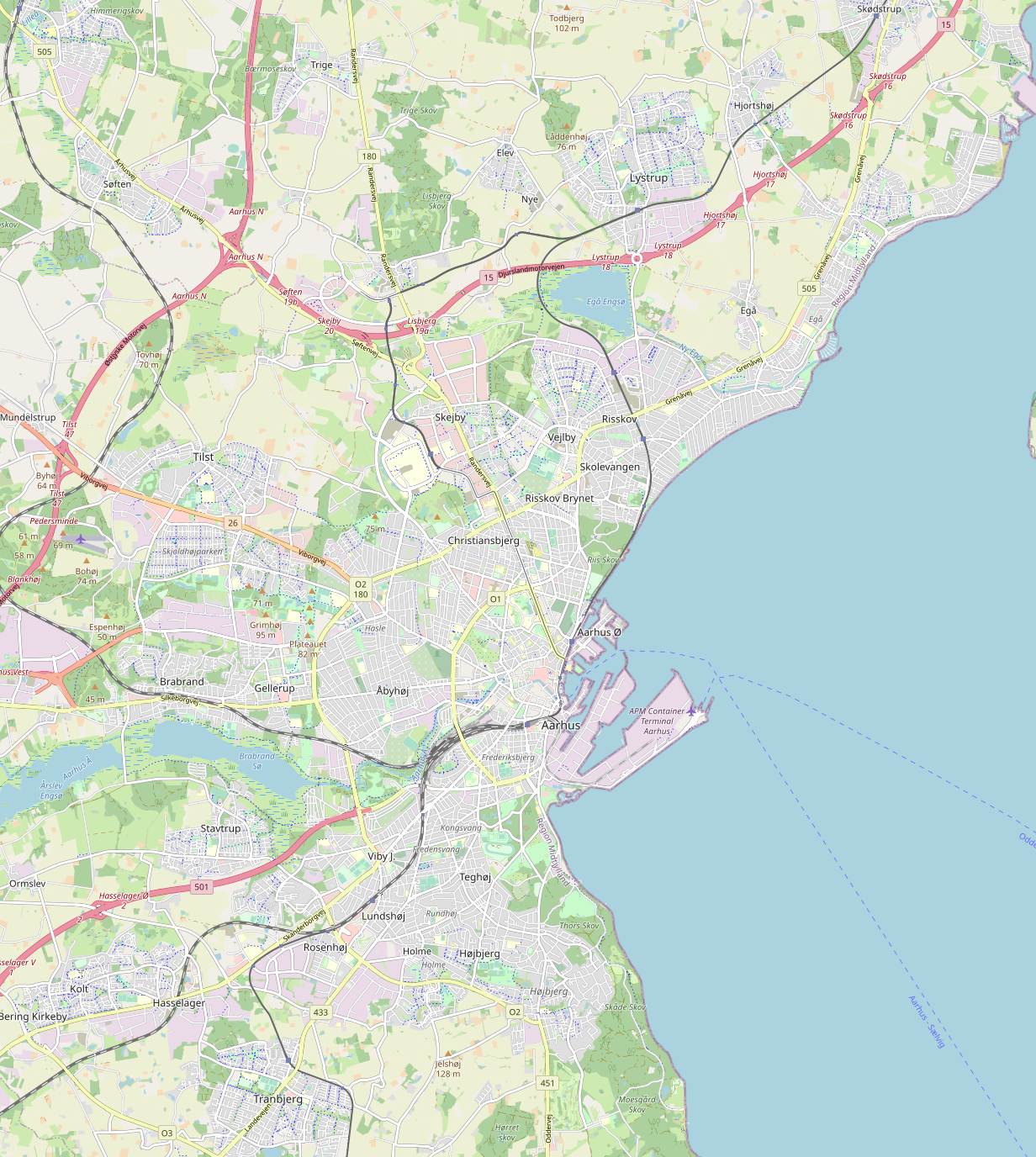
- Location within Aarhus
- Coordinates: 56.139300°N 10.198093°E
- Country: Kingdom of Denmark
- Regions of Denmark: Central Denmark Region
- Municipality: Aarhus Municipality
- District: Aarhus C
- Postal code]: 8000

Marselisborg is a small borough of Aarhus, Denmark. Being small and situated just south of Frederiksbjerg, Marselisborg is often considered part of Frederiksbjerg.

== History ==
Like most of the boroughs outside the inner city of Aarhus, Marselisborg is a relatively new neighbourhood and got its name from the Marselisborg Manor, when the city council of Aarhus acquired the estate from the Marselis family in 1896. The Marselisborg Manor accidentally burned down soon after, and was replaced by the Marselisborg Gymnasium in 1911. The majority of the buildings in Marselisborg are from the early part of the 1900s and the borough is one of the most affluent areas in Aarhus Municipality, presenting large villas and mansions. Marselisborg means Marselis-castle, a name invented for the Marselisborg Manor by Constantin Marselis, to replace the older name of Havreballegård.

== Overview ==
Placed in the northern outskirts of the Marselisborg Forests, Marselisborg is both close to nature and has several buildings and highlights, that attracts people from all over Aarhus. The large event venue of Tangkrogen at the Bay of Aarhus, hosts several major events throughout the year and the adjacent Marselisborg Yacht Harbour, attracts many tourists in the summer.

In addition, these facilities should be highlighted:

- Mindeparken
- Marselisborg Palace
- Marselisborg Yacht Harbour
- Tivoli Friheden
- Atletion stadium
- Jutland Racecourse (for horse riding)
- Aarhus Cycling Arena
