= Constantinsborg =

Coordinates: 56.0668°N 10.1877°E

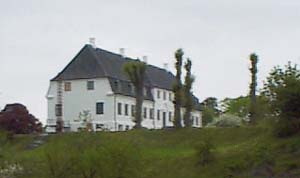
- Interactive map of the Constantinsborg area

General information
- Architectural style: Neoclassical
- Location: Aarhus Municipality, Denmark
- Completed: 1842

Technical details
- Floor count: 3

Constantinsborg is a manor in Aarhus Municipality, Denmark which has existed since at least 1400. It is situated on the southern shore of Årslev Engsø, a newly created nature reserve and shallow lake extension of Brabrand Lake, in Viby J 10 km. south-west of Aarhus. The manor and estate are privately owned today and ran as a farm. Constantinsborg was originally known as Stadsgaard but was later renamed after Constantin Marselis who owned the estate in the 1600s. In the 1800s the Pontoppidan family owned the estate and came to have a large impact on Danish agriculture and the transformation of the Jutland moors into agricultural land. The current main manor building was constructed in the early 1800s while adjoining farm buildings date back to 1870 and the 20th century.

== History ==
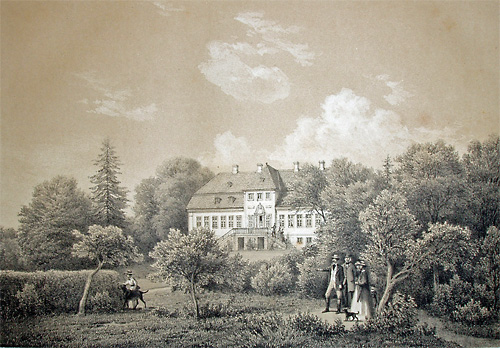
Drawing by F. Richardt in Prospecter af danske Herregaarde

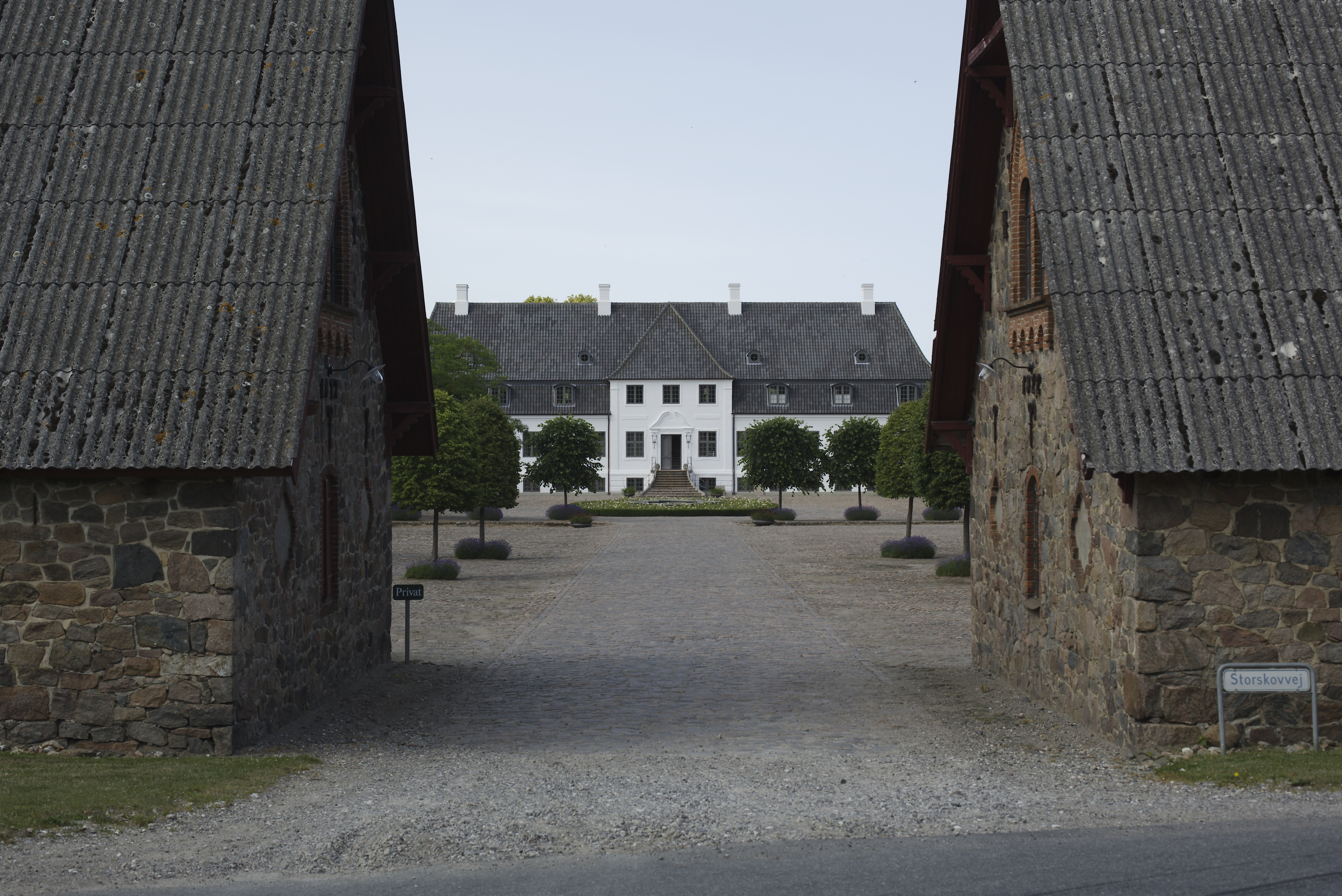
Main building seen from the main entrance in the south.

Present day Constantinsborg dates back to around 1400 when it was owned by Erik Jensen Munk and known as Stadsgaard. In 1210 there was a forest named Stad in the area and is mentioned in the records of the Ancient See of Aarhus which owned the forest at the time. It is therefore possible the original farm dates back to an even earlier time. When Erik Jensen Mun died, his son Peder Lykke, inherited the estate and managed it until his death in 1464. The manor stayed in the Lykke family until 1583 when Valdemar Parsberg sold it to King Frederik II.

King Frederik II bought the manor in order to expand his hunting grounds around Skanderborg Palace. When Constantinsborg became crown land it was made a part of Havreballegård fiefdom. In 1661 the fiefdom - and Constantinsborg - were given to the Dutch merchant Gabriel Marselis in part-payment for debts incurred by the Danish state during the Second Northern War. In 1667 Gabriel Marselis' son, Constantin Marselis, moved to Denmark to manage his father's many new estates. He moved into Constantinsborg which he named after himself. In 1683 Constantinsborg was officially recognized as a manor with privileges which indicates it was a substantial estate at the time.

In 1699, Constantin Marselis died and his widow Sophie Elisabeth Charisius took over the manor and had it turned into a fee tail. She married Peter Rodsteen who was made a Baron. When Rodsteen died in 1714 the manor passed to Sophie Elisabeth Charisius' nephew Christian Charisius who was married to Dorothea Cathrine Rosenlund. He died in 1724 and she the following year, after which the manor was inherited by their son Constantin August Charisius. Constantin dedicated himself to the administration of Constantinsborg during the 52 years he owned it. He managed to expand the estate, although it left him heavily in debt at this death in 1776.

In 1787, Hans Frederik Fædder-Charisius took over Constantinsborg and was given permission to divide and sell the manor estate provided all profits were set aside for his descendants. The manor was auctioned in 1799. Fædder-Charisius himself bought the main building and lands while most of the attached farms and lands were sold off. When Fædder-Charisius died the manor was sold to Peder Jacob Møller in 1832 who in turn sold it in 1867 to Hendrik Pontoppidan.

After purchasing Constantinsborg Hendrik Pontoppidan became heavily involved in agriculture and Hedeselskabet. He had become wealthy through his trading in Manchester and Hamburg. In the 1840s Hendrik Pontoppidan was a representative for the National Bank of Denmark. In 1851 he was made Consul of the Danish state and he co-founded Aarhus Privatbank which eventually became one of the largest banks in Denmark. Hendrik Pontoppidan died in 1901 but he had already passed the manor on to his son Alfred Pontoppidan who had studied agriculture in Scotland and Hannover. Alfred Pontoppidan's management of Constantinsborg was a success and it became a centre for agricultural education in the area.

In 1999, a Pontoppidan descendant sold Constantinsborg to Bestseller founder, Troels Holch Povlsen.

== Architecture ==
The present main building was constructed in 1801 in Neoclassical style and consists of a single, long brick structure. It has one storey above a deep basement and is characterized by a large frontispiece of two floors with richly decorated portals. The north end of the frontispiece is finished with a low wall in Attic style. The previous building had been constructed by Constantin Marselis in 1677. It is recorded as having been expensive and detailed and about three times larger than the present manor house. It had been designed in the Baroque style with a three-winged main building facing three-winged stables. The middle section of the main building was a two-storey house, inspired by Dutch styles.

The farm buildings at Constantinsborg are situated directly in front of the main building forming a large complex. The oldest part was built by Hendrik Pontoppidan Constantinsborg in 1870 and now stands next to a number of modern buildings from the 2000s, used for offices and administration. The remodelling of 1677 also involved new farm buildings. They have since been replaced using the original basic outline.

The garden was probably created by Constantin Marselis in Baroque style with hedges, boulevards and ponds spread out across three terraces. When Hendrik Pontoppidan took over Constantinsborg in 1867 the garden was altered in the English style with free standing trees and large lawns, although the terraces were preserved.

== Owners ==
From	To	Owner
1400	1405	Erik Jensen Munk
?	1464	Peder Lykke
1464	?	Christoffer Lykke
1521	?	Johanne Lykke
?	1559	Anne Holck
?	1583	Valdemar Parsberg
1583	1661	Danish State
1661	1667	Gabriel Marselis
1667	?	Constantin Marselis
1699	1703	Sophie Elisabeth Charisius (married 1) Marselis, 2) Rodsteen)
1703	1714	Peter Rodsteen
1714	1724	Christian Charisius
1724	1776	Constantin August Charisius (married Else von Falkenskiold)
1776	1787	Ambrosius Charisius
1787	1829	Hans Frederik Fædder-Charisius
1829	1832	Else Margrethe Rosenkrantz (married Fædder-Charisius)
1832	1867	Peder Jacob Møller
1867	1885	Hendrik Pontoppidan
1885	1938	Alfred Pontoppidan
1938	1968	Axel Constantin Pontoppidan
1968	1999	Jørgen Pontoppidan
1999	2002	Troels Holck Povlsen
2002	...	Constantinsborg A/S
