= Marcus Claudius Marcellus (disambiguation) =

Marcus Claudius Marcellus was a Roman general who fought Hannibal's forces during the Second Punic War.

Marcus Claudius Marcellus may also refer to:

- Marcus Claudius Marcellus (consul 331 BC)
- Marcus Claudius Marcellus (consul 196 BC)
- Marcus Claudius Marcellus (consul 183 BC)
- Marcus Claudius Marcellus (consul 166 BC)
- Marcus Claudius Marcellus (aedile 91 BC)
- Marcus Claudius Marcellus (consul 51 BC), political opponent of Julius Caesar, assassinated circa 47 BC by one of his own attendants
- Marcus Claudius Marcellus (nephew of Augustus)
- Marcus Claudius Marcellus Aeserninus, any one of several members of this family, one of whom was consul in 22 BC

== See also ==
- Claudii Marcelli
