= Güldencrone =

- Nobility
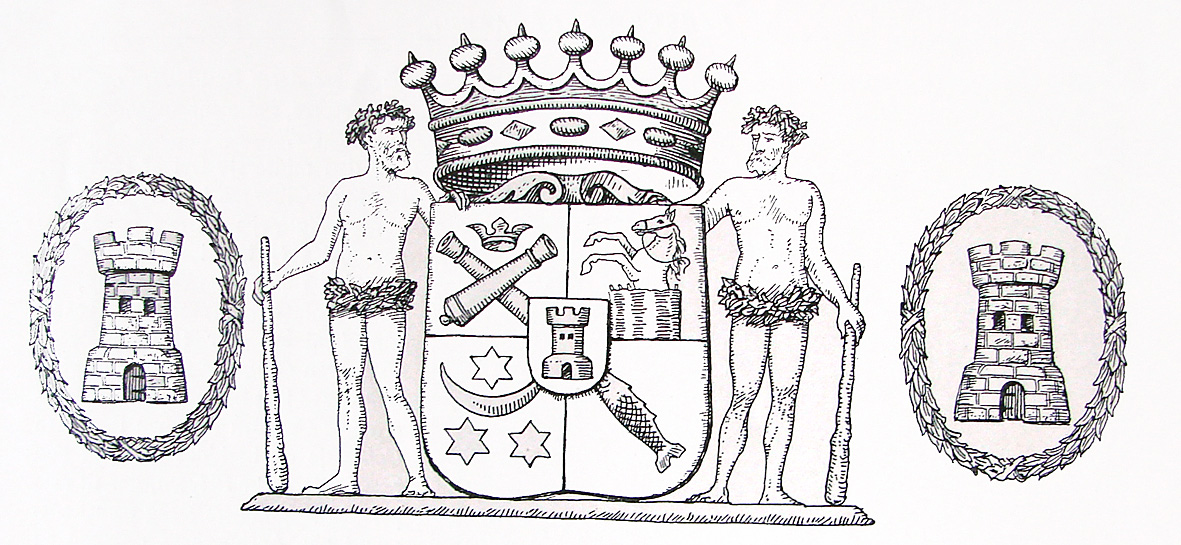
- The Güldencrone coat of arms
- Country: Denmark; Norway
- Founded: 1673
- Founder: Vilhelm Güldencrone
- Titles: Baron
- Estate: Vilhelmsborg

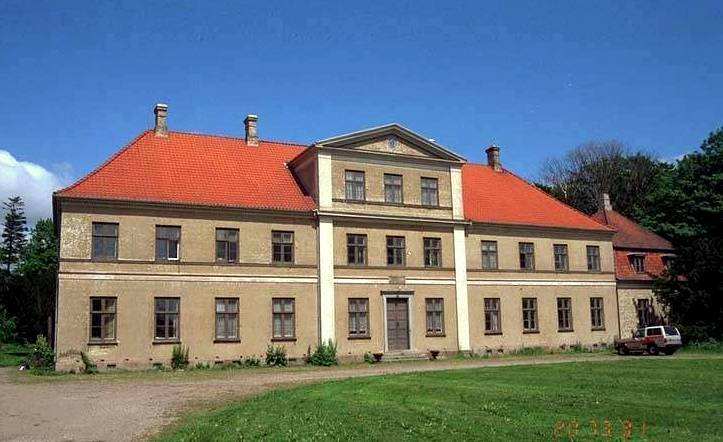
Vilhelmsborg in Aarhus

The Güldencrone family, also spelled Guldencrone and Gyldenkrone, is a Danish and Norwegian noble family with the rank of fief baron.

== Lineage ==
Vilhelm Marselis (1643–1683), who belonged to a 17th-century family prominent in Danish financial circles, was in 1673 raised to the baronial estate with the name Güldencrone. As Fief Baron Güldencrone, he held the Barony Vilhelmsborg in Aarhus. His son, Christian Güldencrone (1676–1746), was the father of Wilhelm Güldencrone (1701–1747), Jens Güldencrone (1712–1770), and Matthias Güldencrone (1703–1753), the latter of whose son was Frederik Güldencrone (1741–1788).

Frederik Güldencrone's sons were Frederik Julius Christian Güldencrone (1765–1824) and Wilhelm Güldencrone (1768–1806), among whose sons were Ove Christian Ludvig Emerentius Güldencrone (1795–1863) and Christian Frederik Güldencrone (1803–1875), who was the father of Christian Güldencrone (1837–1902) and Ove Güldencrone (1840–1880). Ove Güldencrone was an aide-de-camp of King George I of Greece, and in 1877, he presided over the creation of the Greek Navy's torpedo boat fleet.
