= Gabriel Marselis =

Danish tradesman and land owner

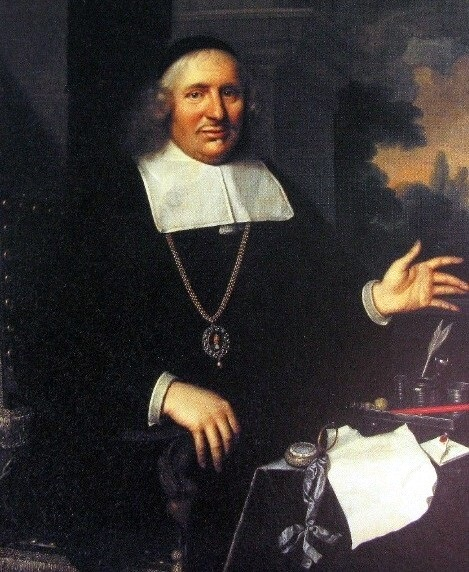
- Gabriël Marselis by Pieter Nason
- Born: 1609; Hamburg
- Died: 5 April 1673 (aged 63–64)
- Occupations: Tradesman and landowner
- Parent: Gabriel Marselis Sr.
- Relatives: Selius Marselis (brother)

Gabriel Marselis (1609 – buried 5 April 1673) was a wealthy Danish tradesman and land owner.

== Biography ==
He was born in Hamburg, the son of the immigrated Dutch merchant Gabriel Marselis Sr. (c. 1575–1643), and was a brother of Selius Marselis. He settled in Amsterdam in 1634 and married the year after. The couple had three sons. In 1655 he remarried.

His trading with King Christian IV of Denmark-Norway was partly paid with the Crown's properties and goods. Marselis thus became the owner of several iron works and copper works in Norway, and also became one of the largest landowners in Denmark and Norway. Among his sons were Vilhelm, Baron and ancestor of the noble family Güldencrone, and Constantin, Baron of Marselisborg and Constantinsborg at Aarhus in Denmark.
