= St. John's Church, Aarhus =

Saint Johannes Church
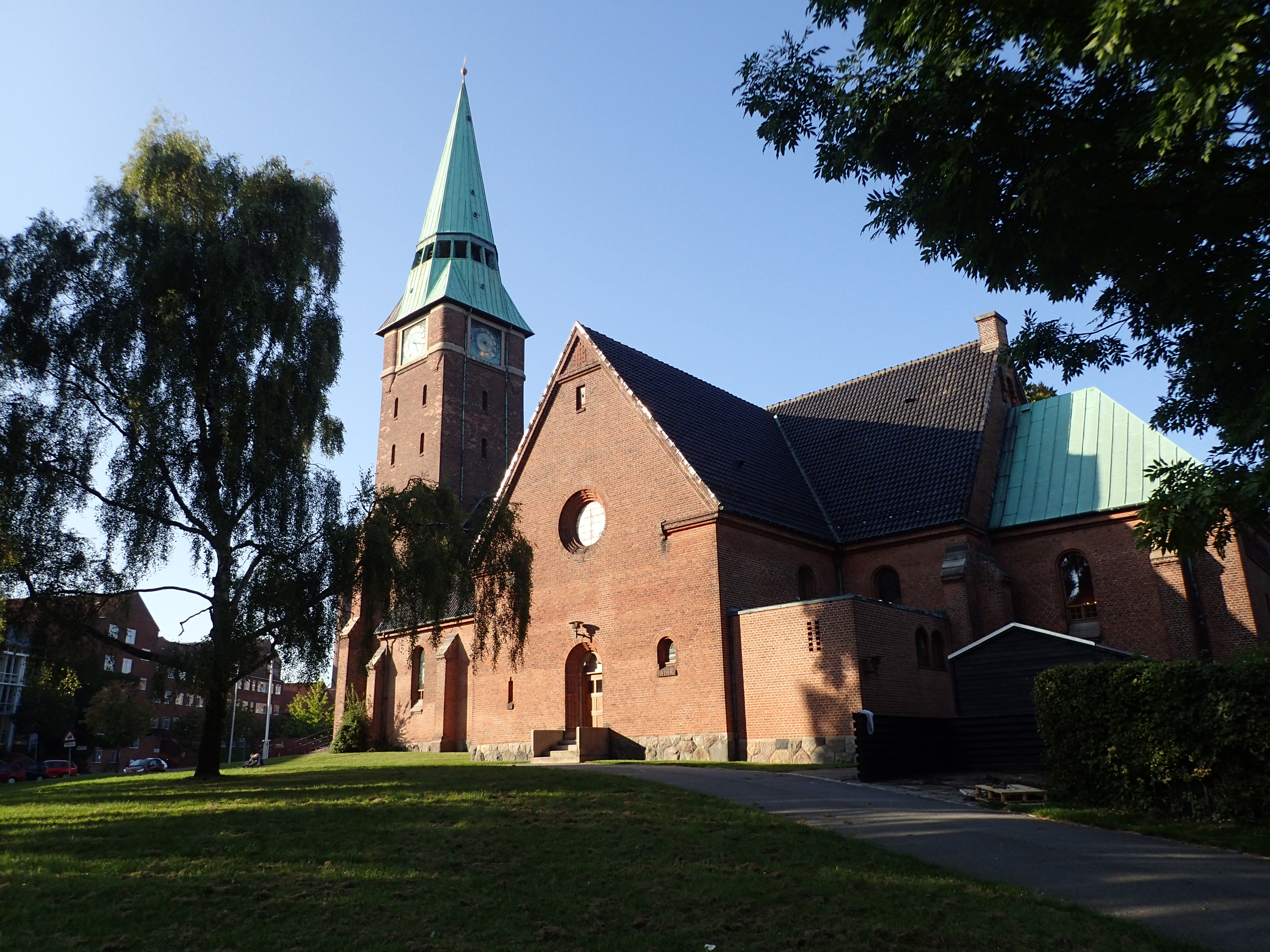
- St. Johannes Church seen from the south
- Saint Johannes Church
- 56.1691°N 10.2102°E
- Location: Peter Sabroes Gade 20; 8000 Aarhus C
- Country: Denmark
- Denomination: Church of Denmark

History
- Status: Church

Architecture
- Architect(s): Hack Kampmann, Valdemar Schmidt
- Architectural type: Neo-Romanesque, Neo-Gothic
- Completed: 1905

Specifications
- Materials: Brick

Administration
- Archdiocese: Diocese of Aarhus

St. John's Church (Danish: Sankt Johannes Kirke) is a congregation of the Church of Denmark in Aarhus, Denmark. The parish church is situated in the Trøjborg neighbourhood, immediately north-west of Nordre Cemetery. In 2015, Saint Johannes Parish counted some 8,916 members.

The church was consecrated in 1905, thus becoming the fourth church to be built in Aarhus.

Saint Johannes Parish was originally part of Aarhus Domsogn but it was made an independent parish when the church was built in 1905. Part of Saint Johannes Parish was separated into Christiansbjerg Church District in 1912 and in 1935 another part of the parish was annexed by Saint Markus Parish.

== Architecture ==
Saint Johannes Church was designed by the architect and Royal Surveyor Hack Kampmann who built a number of other notable structures in Aarhus at the time, including Aarhus Custom House, Aarhus Theatre, Marselisborg Palace and Villa Kampen. Construction of the church was initiated in 1902 and completed in 1905 under the supervision of architect Valdemar Schmidt.

The building is constructed as a traditional cross church with moderate Neo-Romanesque and Neo-Gothic influences but with an Art Nouveau interior and furnishings. Relatively large, with 700 seats, it is a red brick church with a copper thatched tower in the west and choir in the east. In 1960 rooms were added in the northern and southern cross arms of the church. The wooden fence surrounding the choir was replaced with a new one of brass at the same time. In 1971, the building Johannesgården was constructed next to the church for the parish council. The interior has been altered over the years. The rim chandeliers was replaced with new ones of brass in 1930, the benches have been lowered for aesthetic reasons and in 2005 glass mosaics were installed in the southern windows of the church. The altar and font are the only remnants left of the original decor.

Saint Johannes Church has an organ by Marcussen & Søn from 1979 with 36 notes and the mosaics were designed by Arne Haugen Sørensen.

== See also ==
- List of churches in Aarhus
