= Villa Kampen =

Coordinates: 56.135660°N 10.207792°E

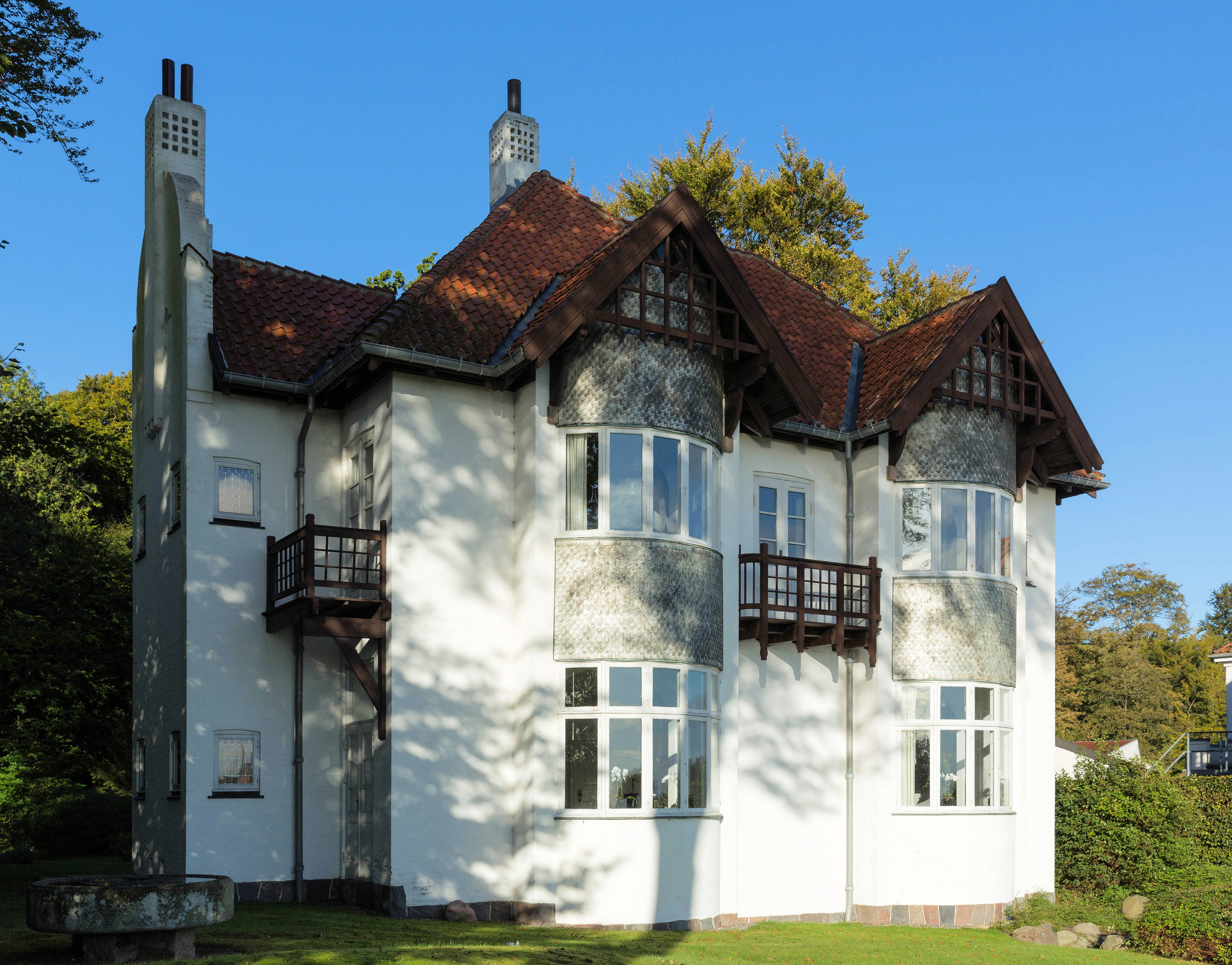
- Main façade of Villa Kampen of Aarhus
- Interactive map of the Villa Kampen area

General information
- Architectural style: National romantic
- Location: Aarhus, Denmark
- Construction started: 1901
- Completed: 1902

Design and construction
- Architect: Hack Kampmann

Villa Kampen is a listed building in Aarhus, Denmark, constructed by architect Hack Kampmann between 1901 and 1902, during his tenure as the Royal Building Inspector for Northern Jutland. Villa Kampen is a villa situated in Midtbyen in central Aarhus, in the affluent neighbourhood around Strandvejen south of the neighbourhood Marselisborg. It lies next to Havreballe Forest behind it and to the west, with an east-facing view of Tangkrogen and the Bay of Aarhus in front of it and the Marselisborg Forests visible on the hills to the south. The building and the surrounding estate was listed on 2 March 1983 by the precursor to the Danish Heritage Agency.

== History ==
Hack Danish architect in the late 19th and early 20th centuries who made many public and private works across Denmark during his career. Kampmann was originally trained as bricklayer but in 1873 he went to study at the Royal Danish Academy of Fine Arts where he graduated in 1878. In 1887 he began his career as an architect and in 1892 he was appointed the Royal Building Inspector of Northern Jutland and he moved his family to Aarhus.

Architecturally Kampmann have had a significant impact on Aarhus. Between 1898 and 1902 he built the National Business Archives and Marselisborg Palace and later went on to build the Custom House and Aarhus Theatre. He was a proponent of the National Romantic style which most of his buildings in Aarhus bear witness to. In 1901 he commenced construction on a private home for him and his family on a hill by the coast, south of the city centre.

== Architecture ==
Villa Kampen was originally situated next to an identical building, built by Kampmann for a bank president, which has since been torn down. The villa is strongly inspired by British architecture of the time and in particular the works of Charles Voysey. The building appears symmetrical from the outside but on the inside the layout of rooms and walls are highly asymmetrical, a typical component of villas in England during this period. Villa Kampen was constructed on a small hill between forests and the ocean and it was designed in cooperation with the landscape architect Edvard Glæsel. The overall design seeks to incorporate and complement the surroundings in an unobtrusive way; the hilly terrain has been preserved and used to make it seem as if the building rises out of the bedrock, shapes are irregular with oriels and arched windows and the estate is enclosed by a wall of small boulders.

Villa Kampen is in two floors with large, bright rooms. It is roofed in red glazed tile and the outer walls are bricks of lime and sandstone, plastered and originally painted white (grey today) with espalier. It sits on a foundation of granite and boulders and is topped with a hip roof. The roof has a cornice consisting of a canopy with visible rafters. There are two arched oriel windows in the front with a balcony between them and another, larger balcony in the back. The buildings is adorned with columns and many minor details in the brick-work testifying to Kampmanns background as a bricklayer.

== See also ==
- Listed buildings in Aarhus Municipality
