= Carlsberg Museum =

Museum in Copenhagen, Denmark

Coordinates: 55.6674°N 12.5307°E

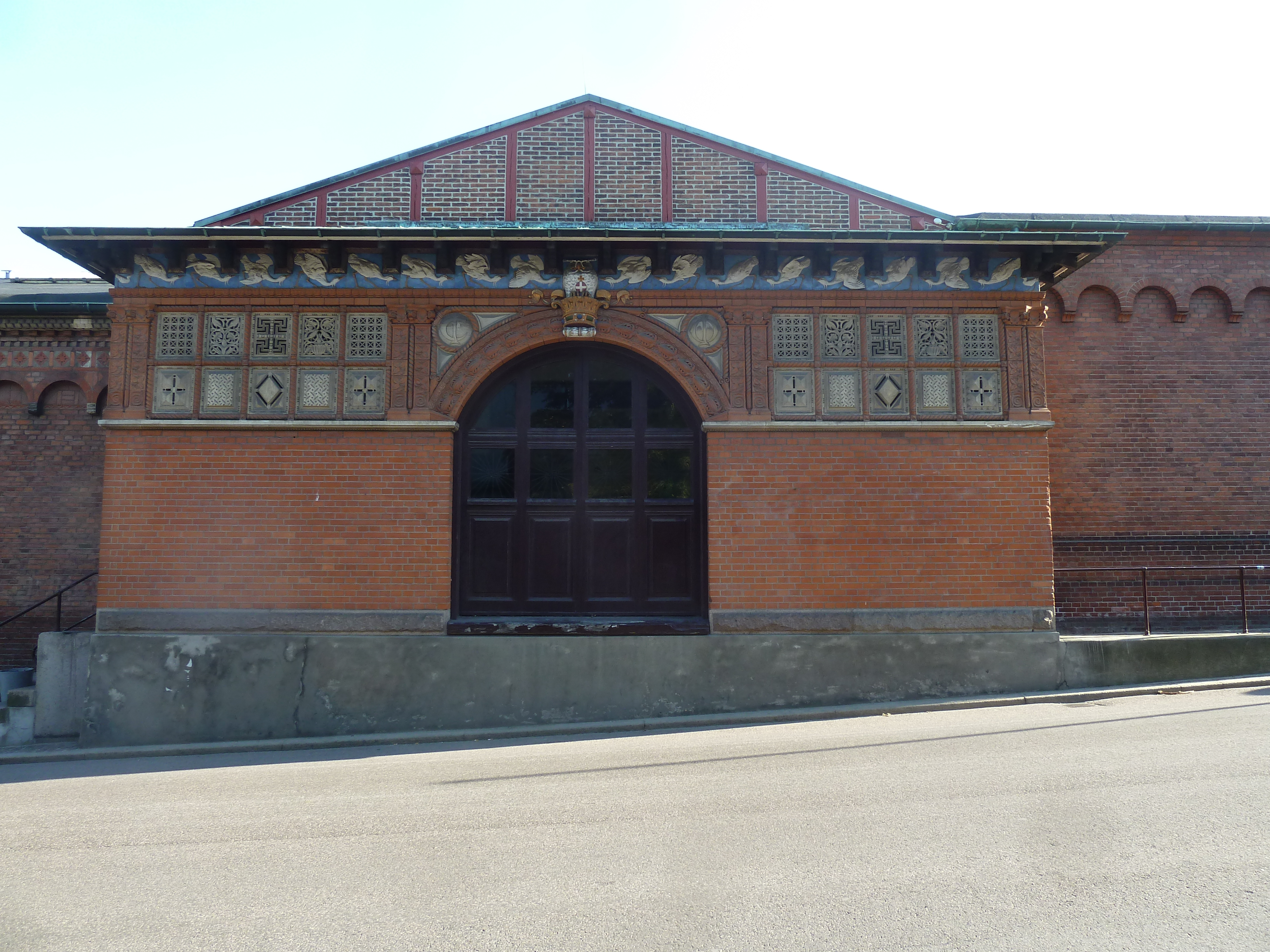
- The main façade on Ny Carlsberg Vej
- Interactive map of the Carlsberg Museum area

General information
- Location: Vesterbro, Copenhagen, Denmark
- Construction started: 1892
- Completed: 1895
- Client: Carl Jacobsen
- Owner: Carlsberg Properties

Design and construction
- Architect: Vilhelm Dahlerup/Hack Kampmann

Carlsberg Museum, situated next to the former home of Carl Jacobsen in the Carlsberg area of Copenhagen, Denmark, was the first home of his sculpture collection, now on display in the Ny Carlsberg Glyptotek in the city centre. The building consists of a total of 20 galleries accumulated between 1892 and 1895 through a series of extensions to designs by Vilhelm Dahlerup and Hack Kampmann. It now serves as a venue for conferences, receptions and other events.

== History ==
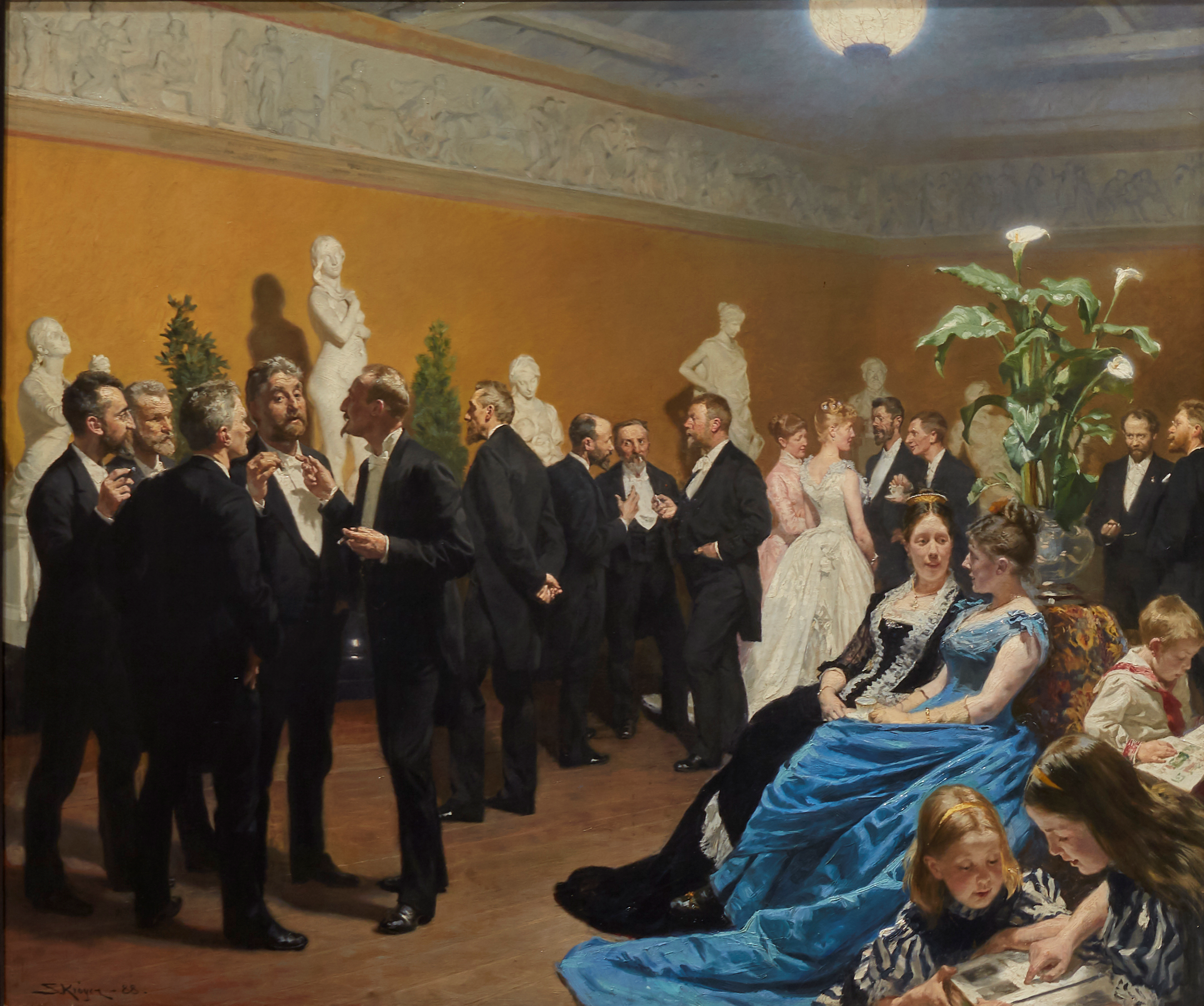
P. S. Krøyer: A Party in the Glyptoteque at Nt Carlsberg, 1888

After purchasing Bakkegården and making it his family home, Carl Jacobsen expanded it with a winter garden in 1882. A passionate art collector, Carl Jacobsen used it for his sculptures which soon outnumbered the plants. In the autumn of 1882, he opened the collection to the public.

The collections grew rapidly and in 1885 Dahlerup expanded the museum with four new galleries (Gallery 2–5) and the following year with another nine (Gallery 6–14).Hack Kampmann who had built Jacobsen a new home in 1892 expanded the museum with six more galleries to its current size in 1896. He also adapted most of the old rooms, leaving only galleries 2–4 unchanged.

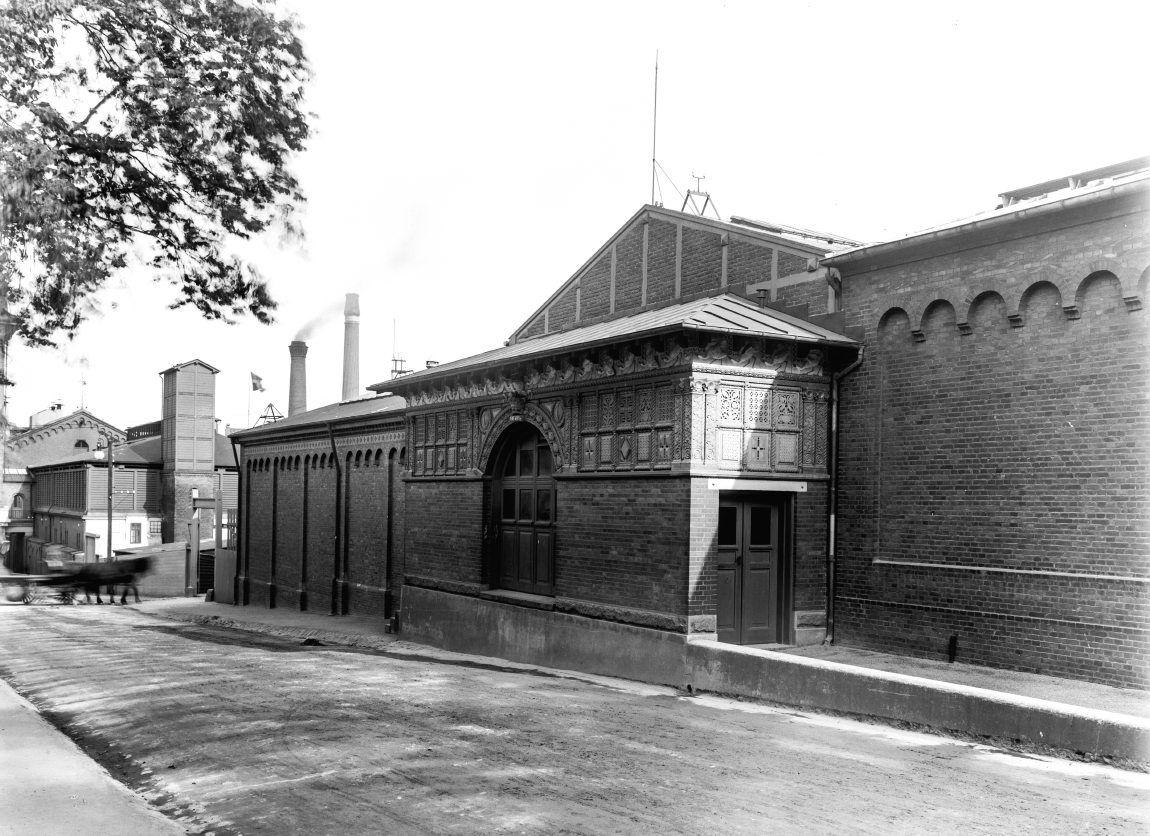
The Carlsberg Museum photographed by Frederik Riise

After the collections were moved to the present Ny Carlsberg Glyptotek in two stages, the modern collection in 1896 and the classical collection in 1905, the building served as a studio for an artist and a private venue for celebrations in the Jacobsen family. In 1915, Vagn Jacobsen, Carl Jacobsen's son and successor as director of Carlsberg, turned it into a museum with exhibitions about the brewery's history. For many years it was the last stop on guided tours of the brewery but in 1999 Carlsberg opened a new visitor centre elsewhere and on 1 June 2009 the museum closed permanently.

== Architecture ==
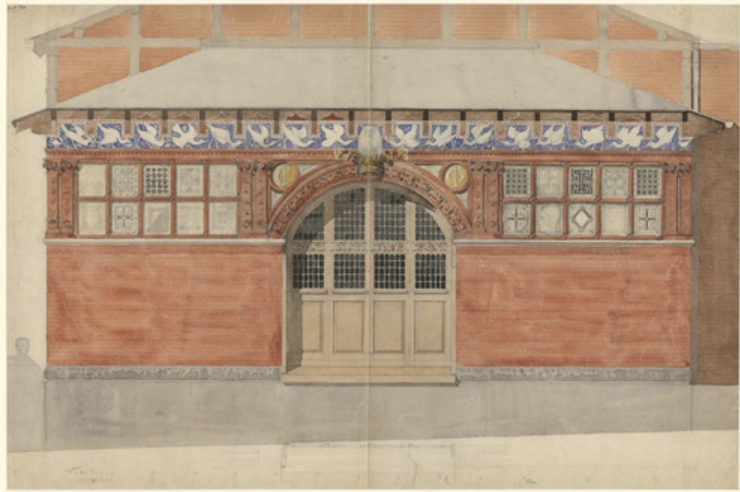
Rendering by Kampmann for the vestibule, 1895.

The building is constructed in red brick. The frieze with cranes on the facade was created by the artist Hansen Rejstrup.

Of particular note is the Empress Gallery which consists of a rotunda featuring four Ionic columns inline with the apse. The remaining galleries display variations in ornamentation of floors, walls and ceilings and are toplit.

== Carlsberg Business Centre ==
Carlsberg Museum is now rented out as a venue for smaller conferences, meetings, dinners, receptions and other similar events under the name Carlsberg Business Centre. It is administrated by Visit Carlsberg.

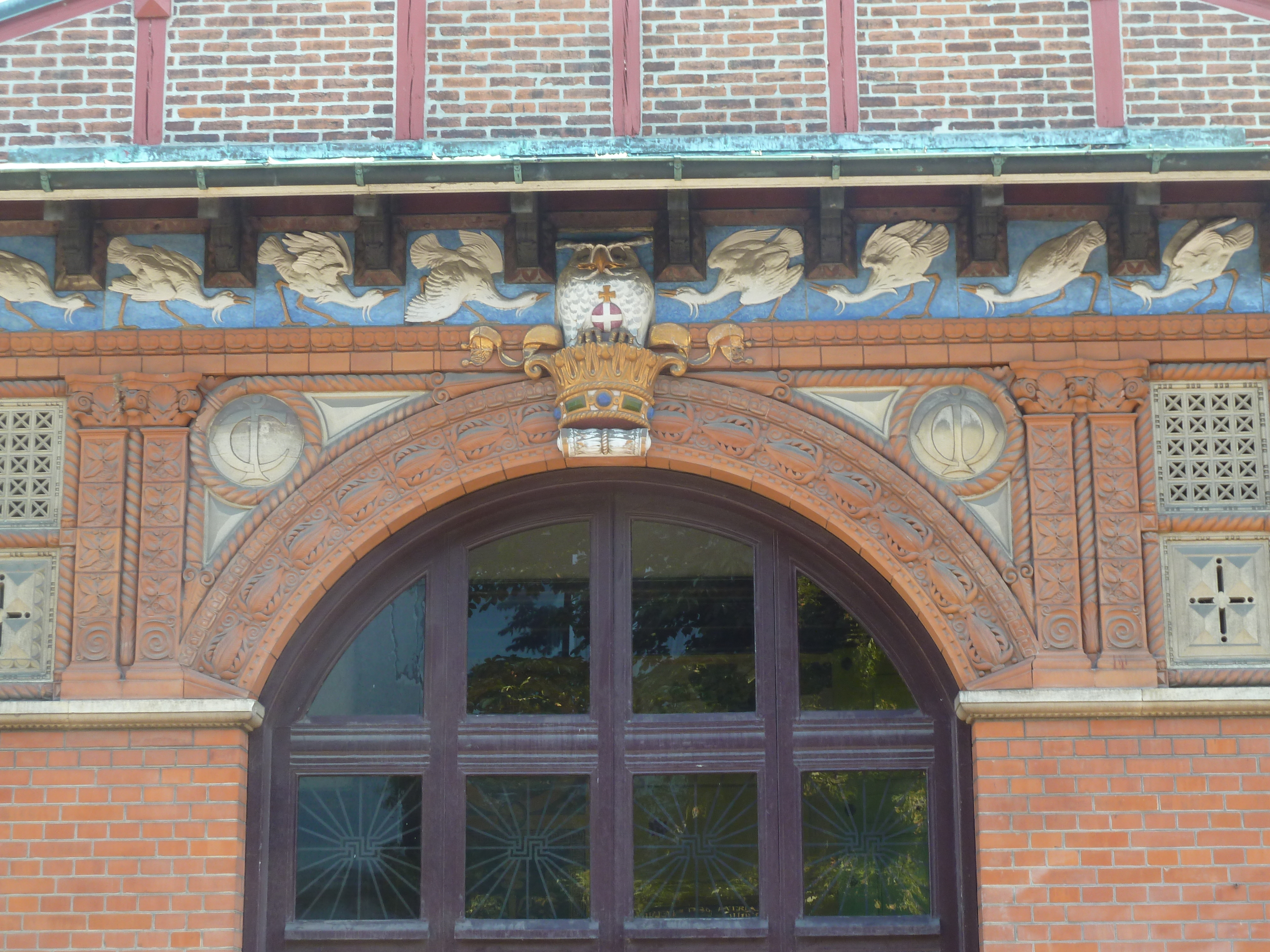
Facade detail

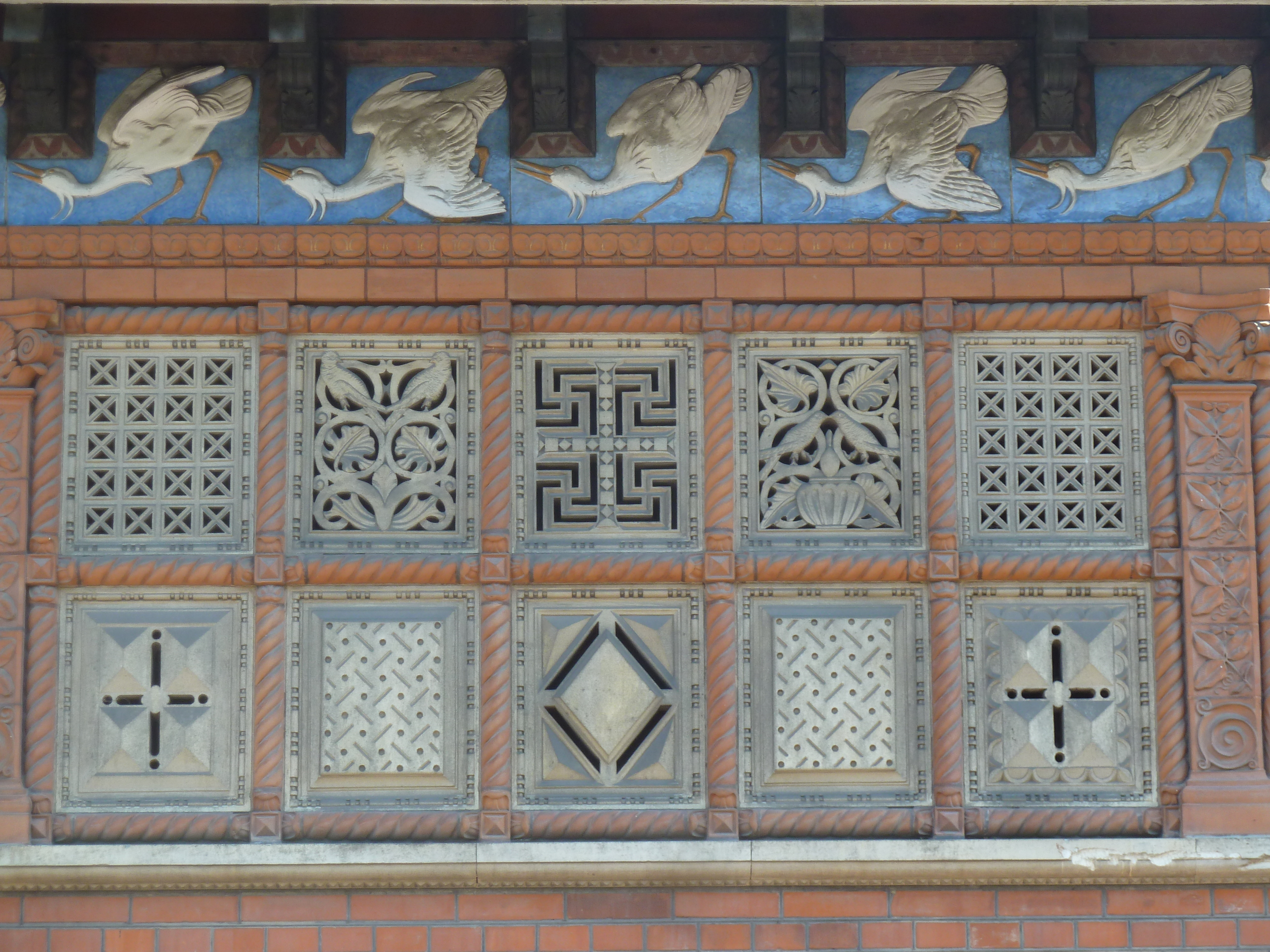
Facade detail
