= Carl Jacobsen House =

Former brewing magnate's villa in Copenhagen

Coordinates: 55.6671°N 12.5301°E

- Carl Jacobsens Villa
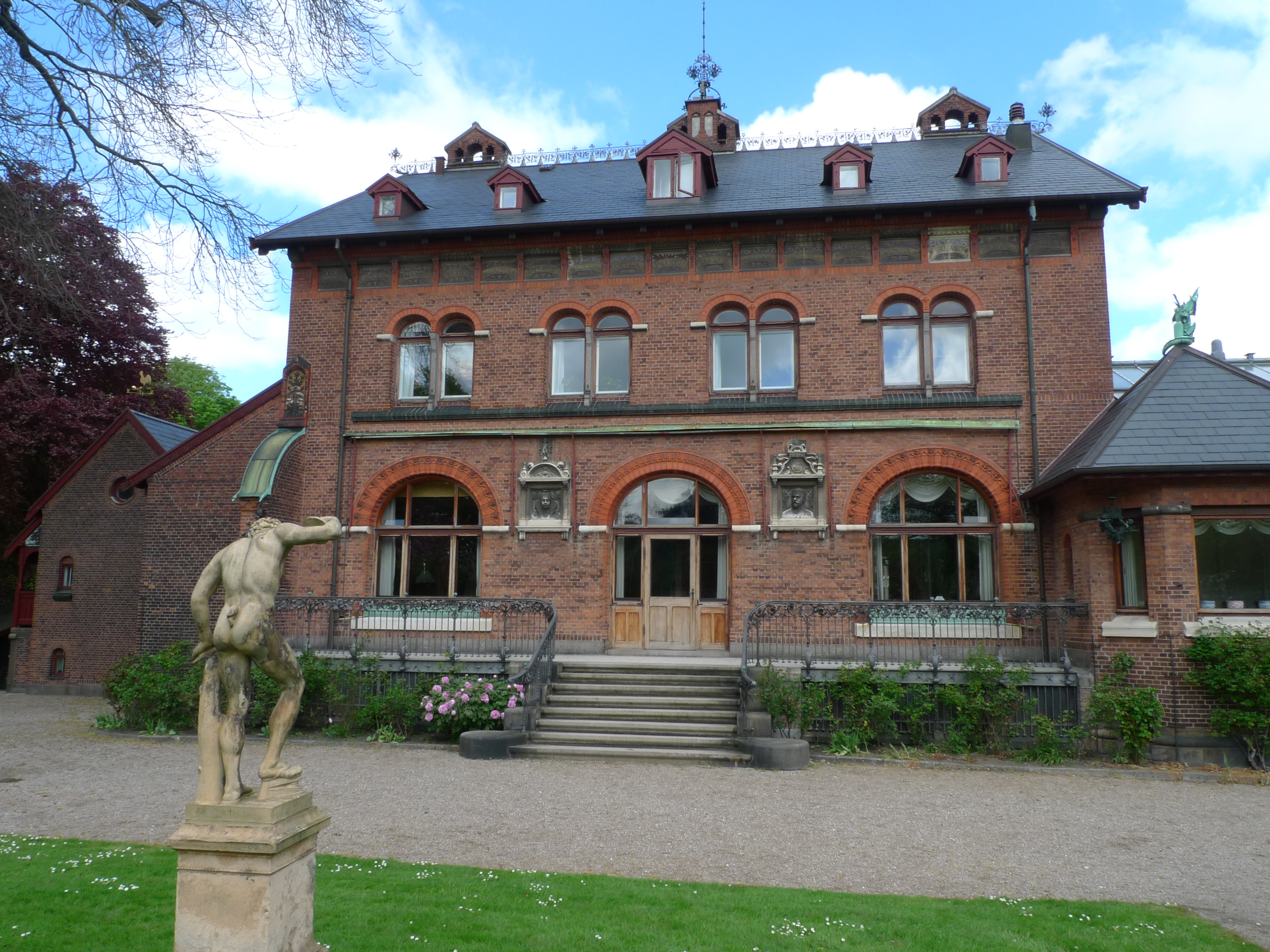
- The house seen from the garden
- Interactive map of the Carl Jacobsen House area

General information
- Location: Vesterbro, Copenhagen, Denmark
- Construction started: 1891
- Completed: 1892
- Client: Carl Jacobsen
- Owner: Carlsberg Properties

Design and construction
- Architect: Hack Kampmann

The Carl Jacobsen House is the former home of Carl Jacobsen and one of the listed buildings in the Carlsberg area of Copenhagen, Denmark.

== History ==
In 1880, Carl Jacobsen purchased the property Bakkegården next to his father's brewery and made it his family home. His wife Ottilia Jacobsen gave birth to their first child.

Between mid-1887 and January 1890 the couple lost four children to disease. Devastated by their loss, Carl Jacobsen demolished the old house and constructed a new home in the grounds. It was designed by the architect Hack Kampmann and completed in 1892.

After Carl Jacobsen's death in 1914, members of the family continued to live in the house until 1998. It was then refurbished and is now used by Carlsberg for meetings.

== Architecture ==
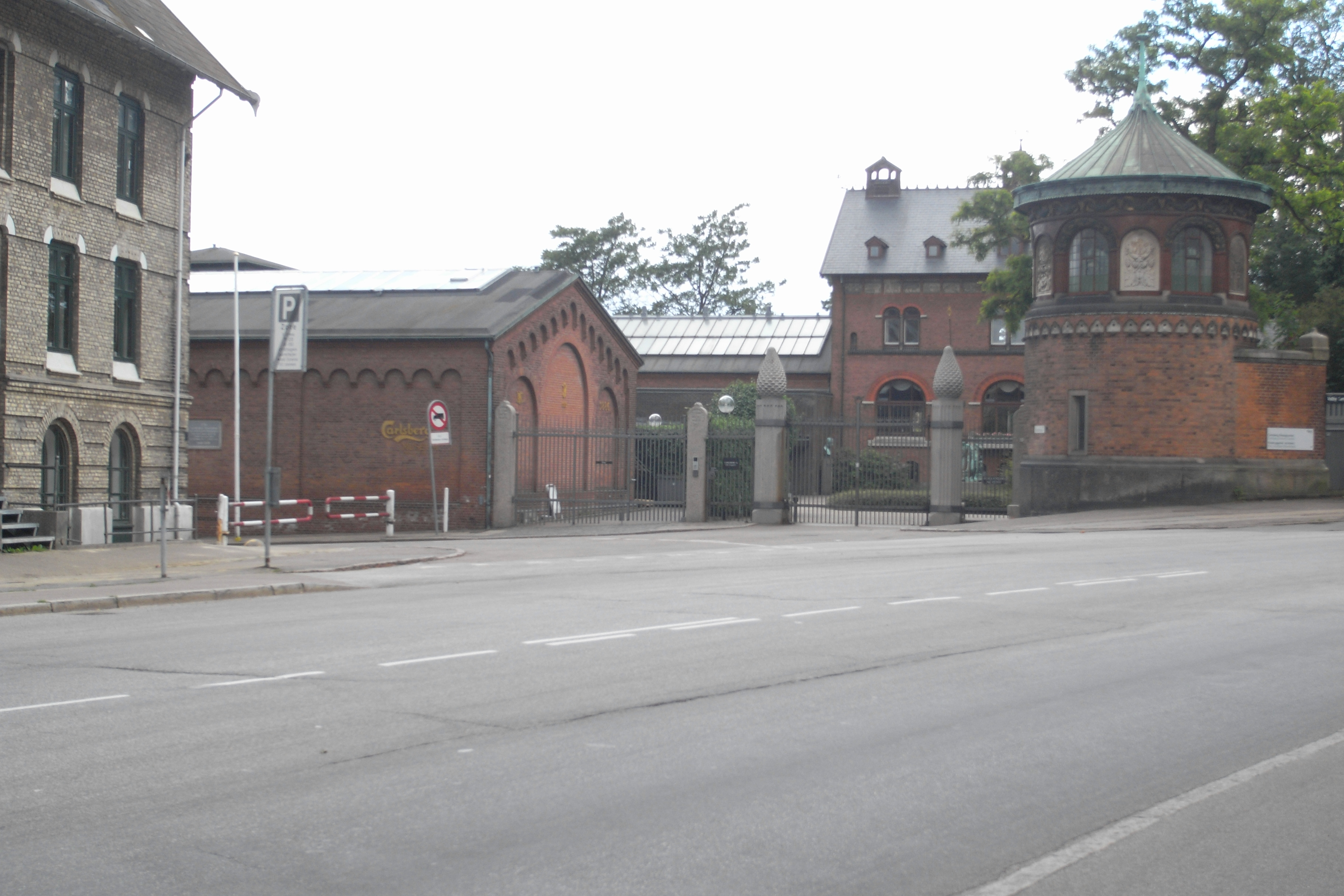
The entrance

The house lies pulled back from the street and is entered through a rough iron gate flanked by Carlsberg Museum building on one side and a small round guardhouse on the other.

The right side of the house stands on a granite plinth and is built in red brick. The stills are made of glazed tiles and slate, and window frames are in red-painted wood.

A flight of stairs leads up to the entrance which is sheltered by a roof supported by granite columns. The lintel bears Carl and Otilia Jacobsen's names in French, Bien faire—laisser dire ("do the right thing and let people talk"), which is also seen on the high walls of the winter garden at the Ny Carlsberg Glyptotek.

The left side of the main building is also in red brick and has a richly decorated facade. There are Zodiac symbols around the cornices.

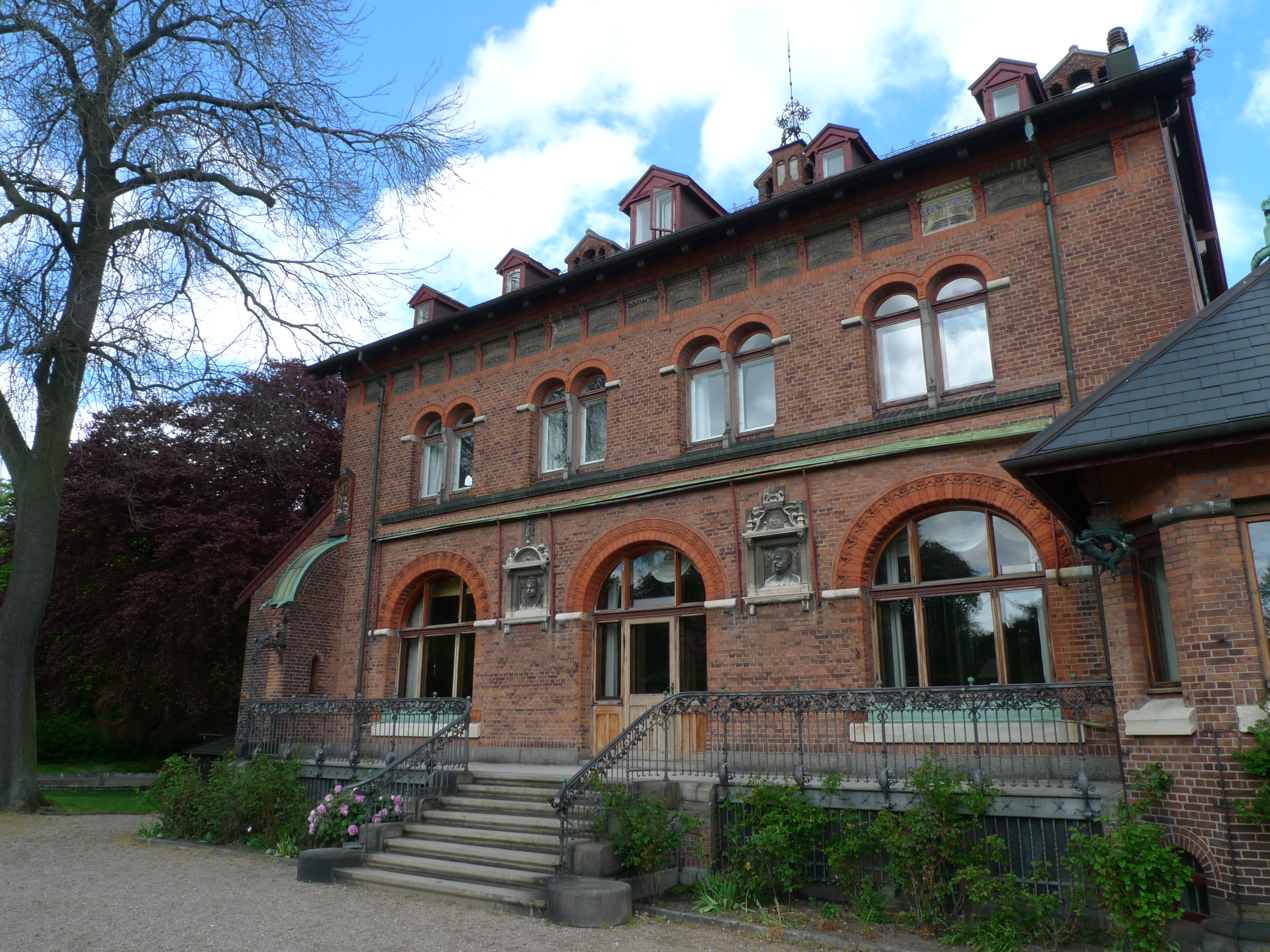
The rear side of the house

The roof is clad in slate shingles and has copper flashings, ornamental chimneys and decorative wrought iron metalwork along the roof ridge.

Many of the building's decorations, both internally and externally, refer to the Jacobsen family or their brewery. Carl and Ottilia Jacobsen's names, as well as those of their children and of his parents and grand parents, from part of the decorations on the facade facing the garden.

The servants' wing is decorated with glazed ceramic reliefs of grasses and fruits created by K. Hansen Reistrup at Kähler's workshop.

== Garden ==
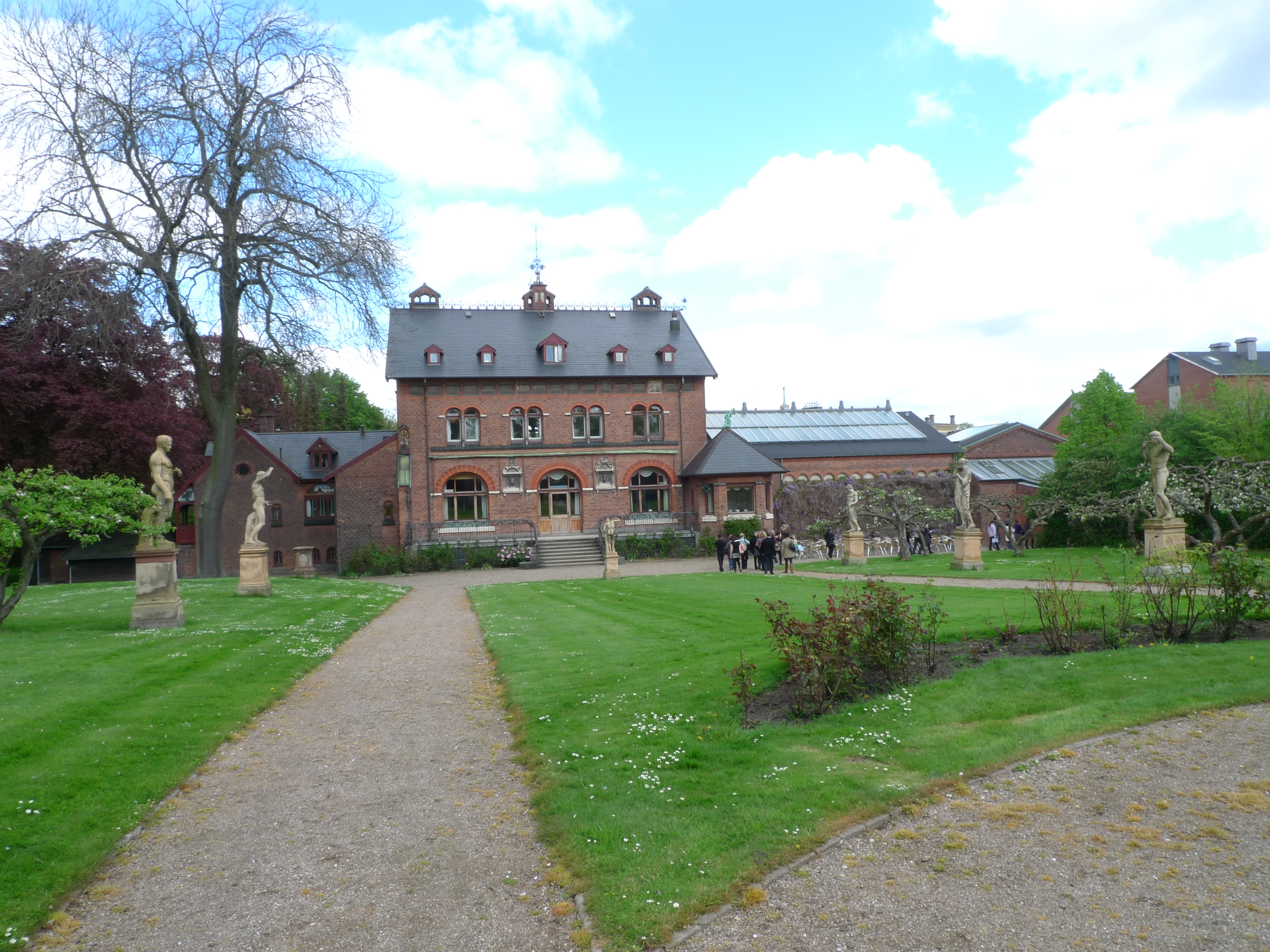
The garden

On the rear side of the house, a raised veranda with a rough iron balustrade runs along the full length of the building, overlooking the garden. A pavilion in Venetian style serves as a visual backdrop to the garden as seen from the house. It was completed by Hack Kampmann in 1895 and has an open front where two marble columns support three arches. A balustrade runs along the edge of the roof. Two parallel paths lined with copies of classical sculptures connect the two buildings.

Hackmann has also designed a thatched ice house which was built in 1896. In cold winters, the ice came from nearby Damhus Lake and was otherwise imported from Norway. Later the building was used for storing fruit and other produce from the garden.
