= Grey House, Carlsberg =

The Grey House
- Det Grå Hus
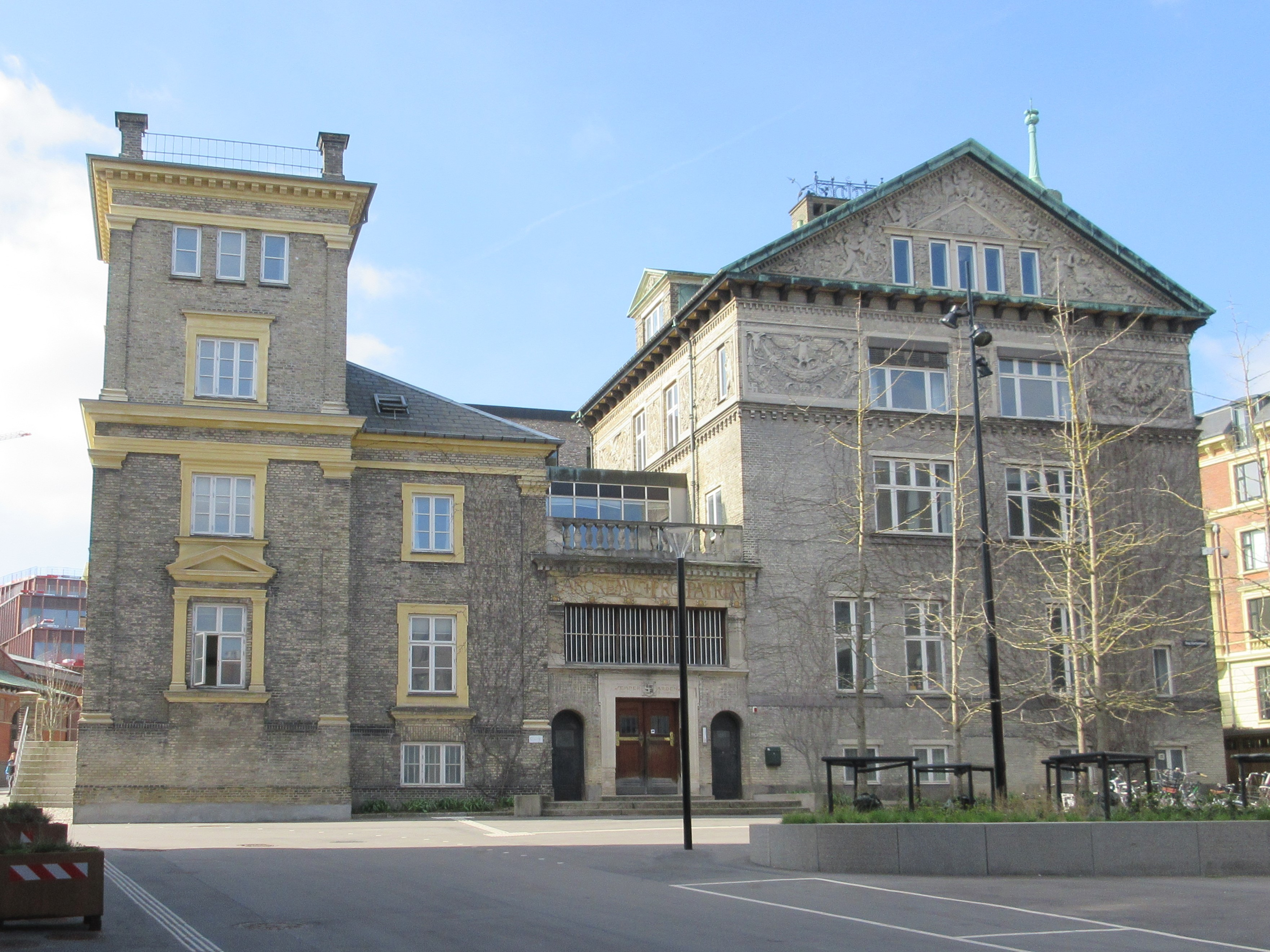
- The building seen from the east
- Interactive map of the The Grey House area

General information
- Type: Office building
- Architectural style: Neoclassical
- Location: Vesterbro, Copenhagen
- Coordinates: 55°40′04″N 12°31′52″E
- Completed: 1901

Technical details
- Floor count: 2
- Floor area: 1,406 square metres (15,130 sq ft)

Design and construction
- Architect: Hack Kampmann

The Grey House (Danish: Det Grå Hus) is a listed building in the Carlsberg area of Copenhagen, Denmark.

== History ==
=== Winstrup's house ===
The oldest part of the building is a house built in 1875. The building was designed by Laurits Albert Winstrup.

=== Carlsberg ownership ===
It was acquired by Carl Jacobsen in connection with his foundation of the Ny Carlsberg Brewery. The new brewery's administration used the ground floor while the first and second floor contained a residence for a leading employee.

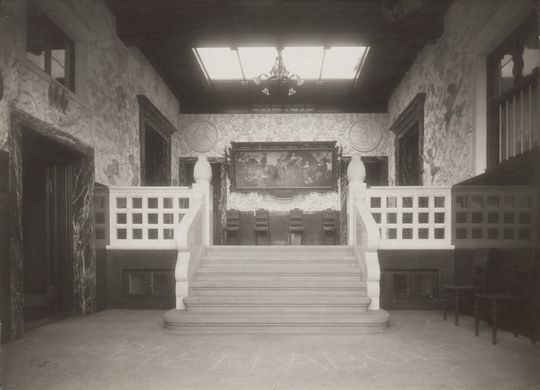
The vestibule shortly after the expansion

In 1901, Hack Kampmann altered the building and created an extension on its north side which doubled its floor area, adding a vestibule, offices and a laboratory.

In 1970, the building was once again expanded, this time with a laboratory wing to the west.

== Architecture ==
The building is constructed in yellow brick with sandstone bands around the windows. The roof is clad in slate and zinc with flashings of copper and zinc. The facade is decorated with sandstone reliefs and there is a sandstone balustrade above the main entrance. Ny Carlsberg's trademark and Carl Jacobsen's motto, Semper ardens, are seen above the door.

The vestibule is lavishly decorated with stuccos.

== Gallery ==
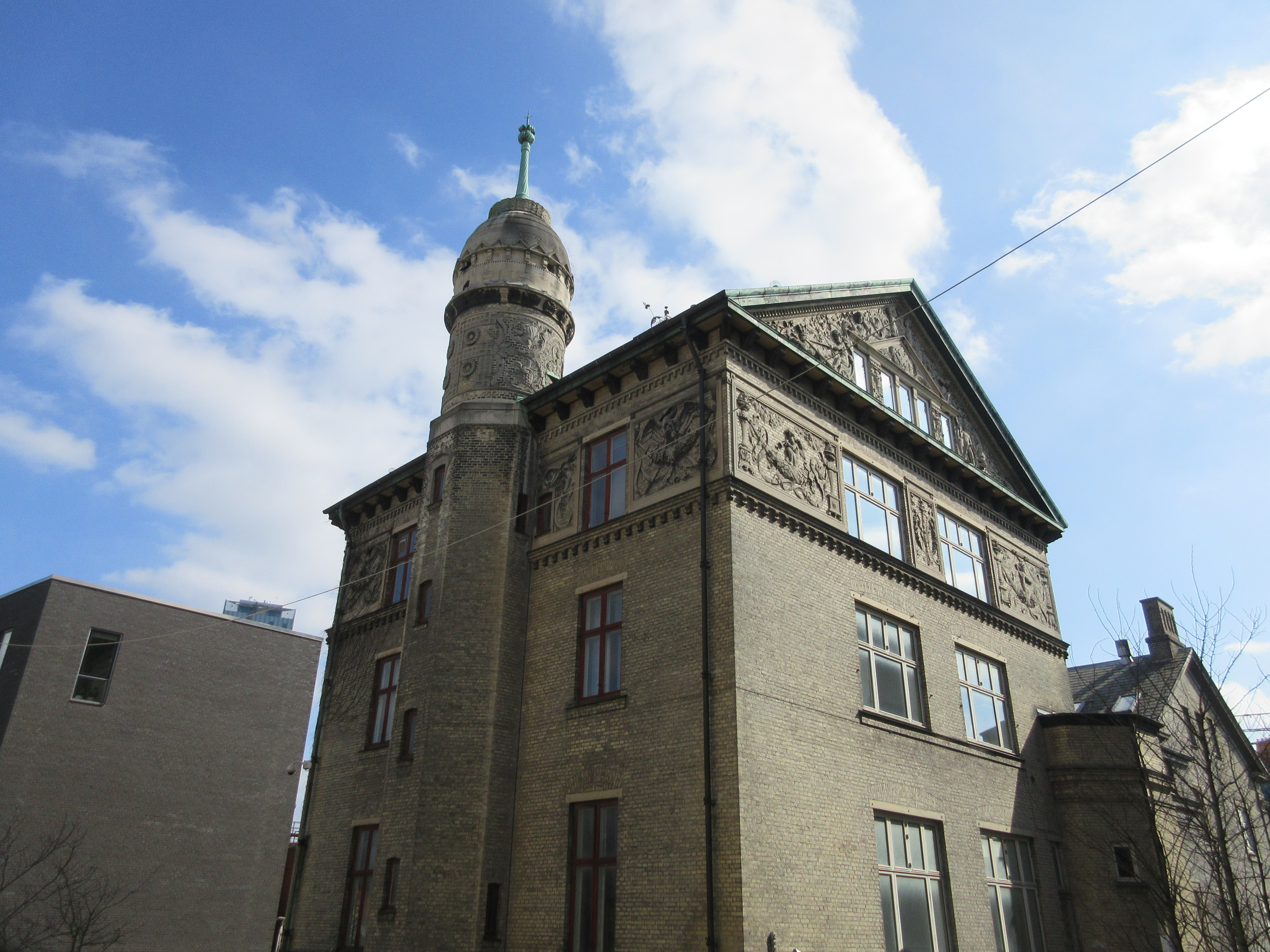

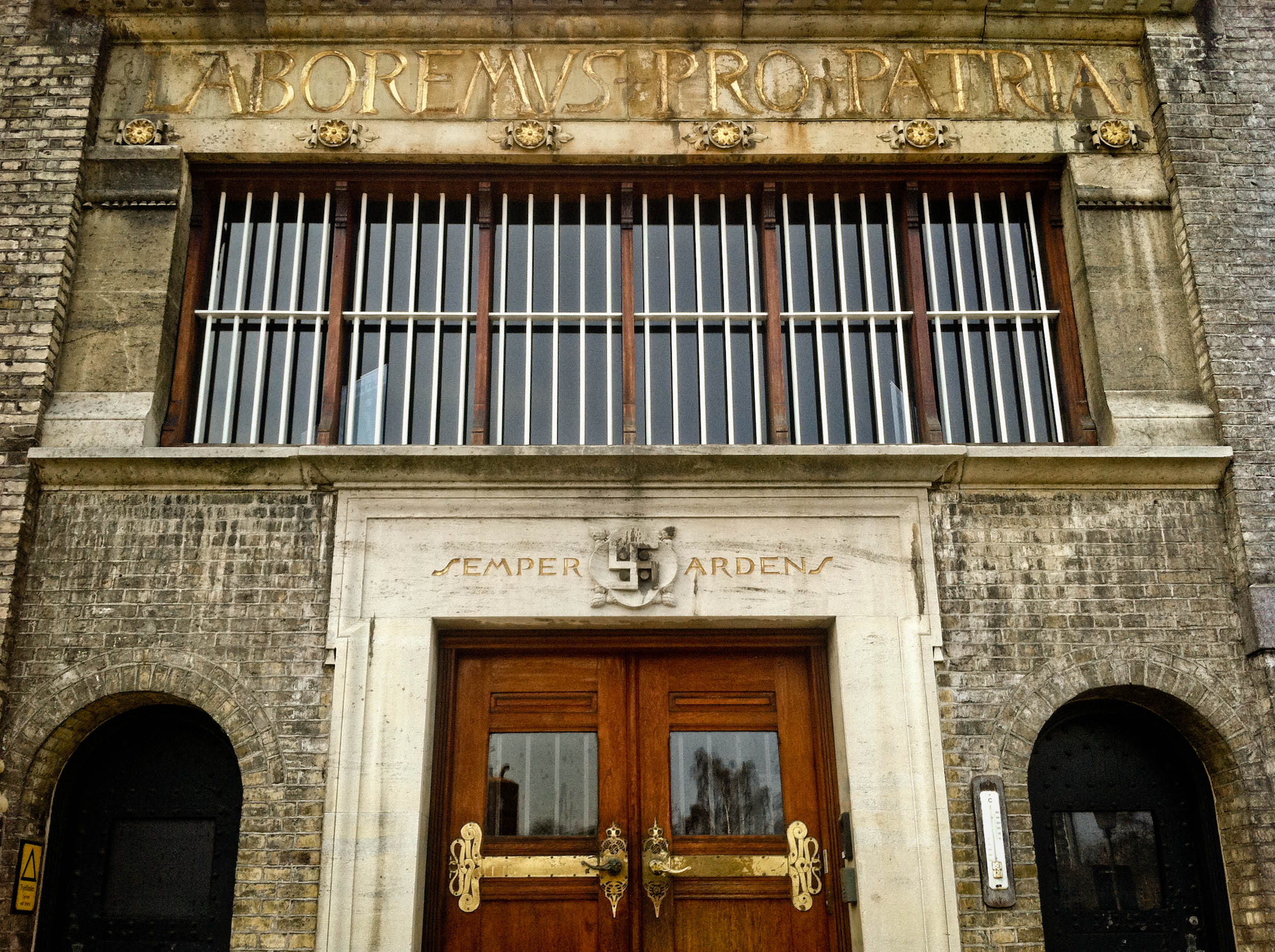
Facade detail

== See also ==
- Ny Carlsberg Glyptotek
