= Aarhus Custom House =

Building in Aarhus, Denmark

Coordinates: 56.1555°N 10.2131°E

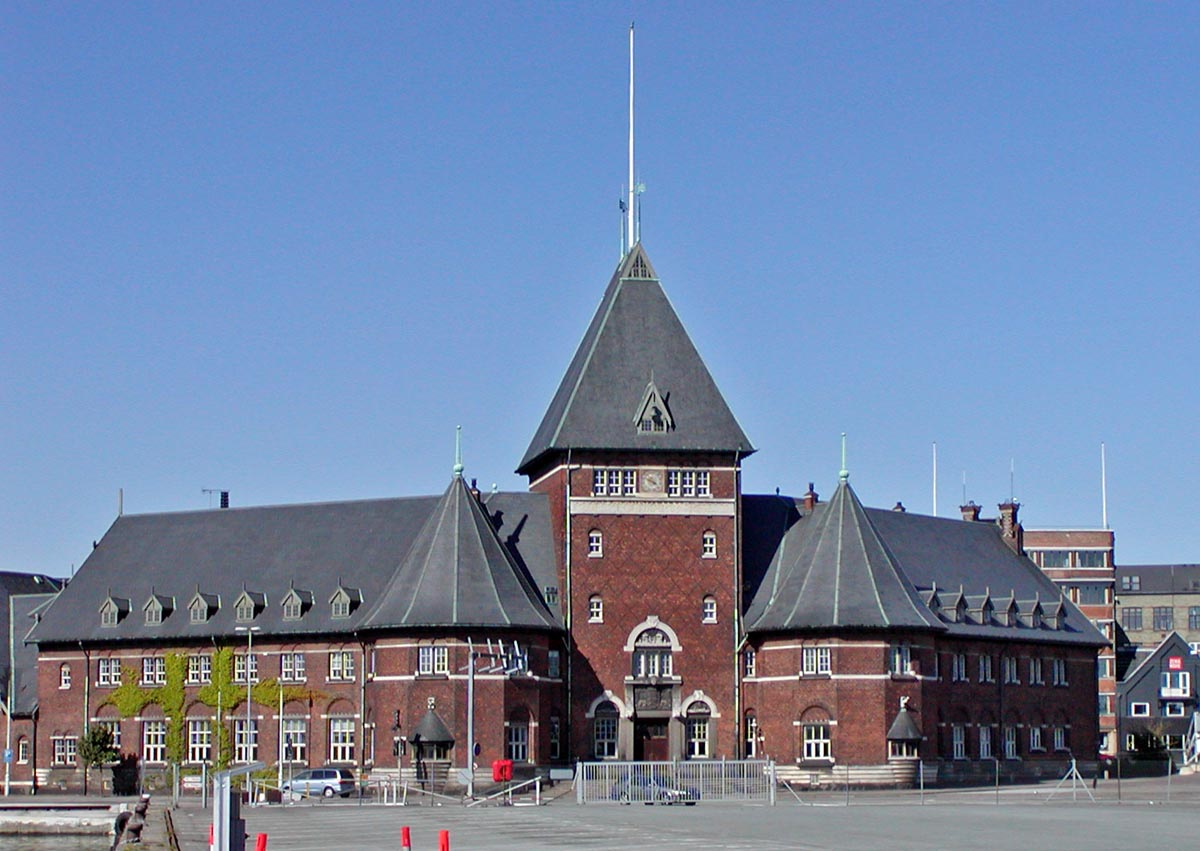
Custom House (Toldkammeret, 1898)

The Aarhus Custom House (Toldkammeret) is located on the harbour front in Aarhus, Denmark. Completed in 1898, it is said to be Hack Kampmann's finest work. Kampmann also designed other buildings in the city including Marselisborg Palace and Aarhus Teater.

The building was used by the tax authorities until the mid-1990s. Tækker Group, who purchased the building in 2004, have fully renovated the building in collaboration with the cultural authorities, taking care to maintain the Kampmann style. After being used in recent years by the architecture school and as a student hostel, the building currently houses a restaurant.

== Literature ==
- Andersen, Jørgen M.; Havn, Århus (2005). Toldboden Århus Havn. Århus Havn.
