= Hack Kampmann =

Danish architect (1856–1920)

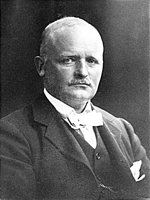
- Born: 6 September 1856; Ebeltoft, Denmark
- Died: 27 June 1920 (aged 63); Frederiksberg, Denmark
- Occupation: Architect
- Buildings: Aarhus Theatre; Marselisborg Palace; Copenhagen Police Headquarters; Ny Carlsberg Glyptotek Art Museum; Frederiksberg Courthouse

Hack Kampmann (6 September 1856 – 27 June 1920) was a Danish architect, Royal Inspector of Listed State Buildings in Jutland and professor at the architecture department of the Royal Danish Academy of Fine Arts. Marselisborg Palace in Aarhus, built between 1899 and 1902, is among his best known works.

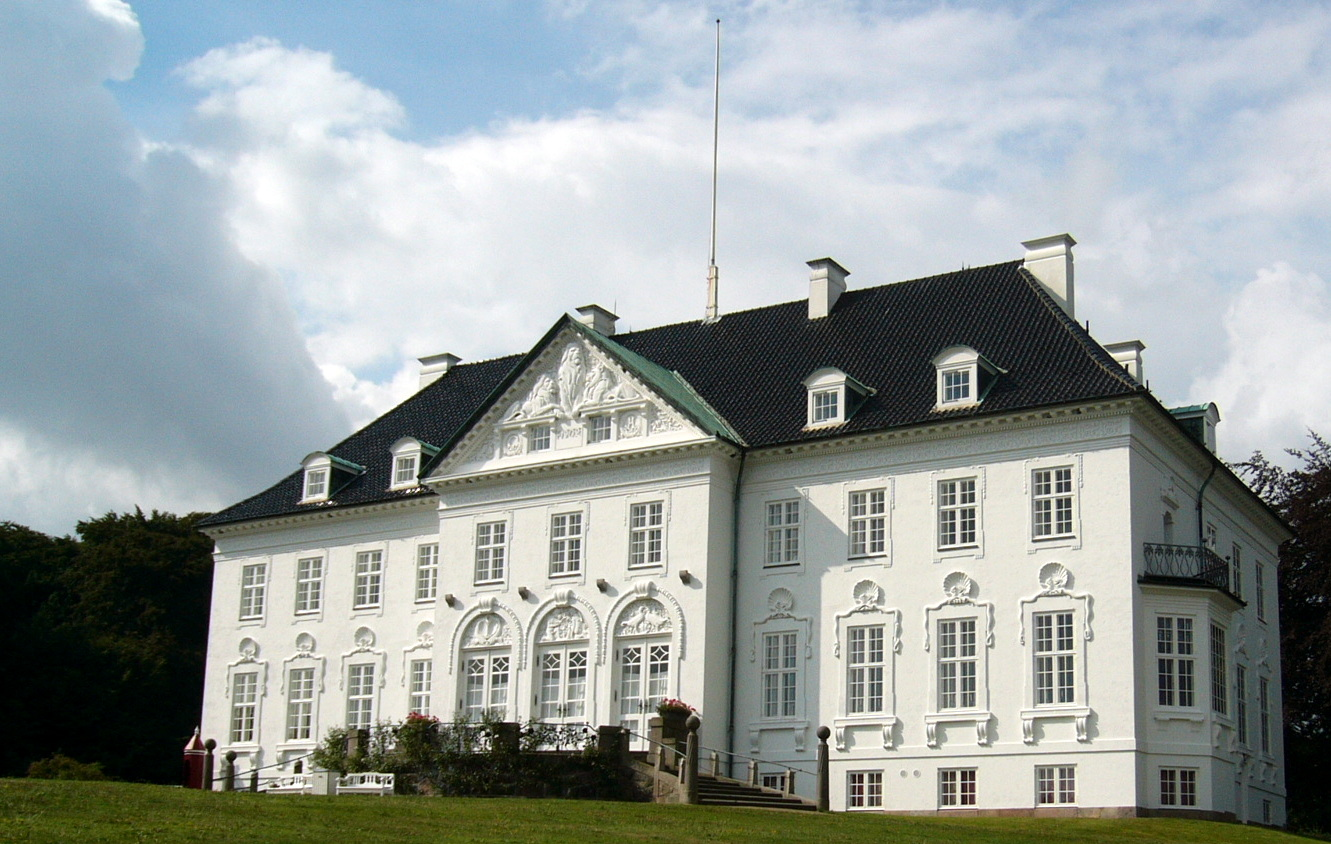
Marselisborg Palace in Aarhus

== Biography ==
His parents were Christian Peter Georg Kampmann, a parish priest, and Johanne Marie Schmidt. He entered the architecture department of the Royal Danish Academy of Fine Arts in 1873 and graduated in 1882, receiving the school's prestigious small gold medal ("Lille guldmedalje") for the design of a "Swimming bath in the Italian Renaissance style".

Kampmann went on numerous study trips throughout Europe, paid for by several scholarships, including northern Italy, Greece and Sweden. He also attended the École des Beaux-Arts in Paris in 1882 and worked with professor Jacques Hermant.

Back home in Denmark, he became a prolific architect, designing private villas, private art museums, commercial buildings, churches, as well as both small state buildings, such as post offices, and large ones such as royal palaces. Among his major works are the Provincial Archives of Northern Jutland (1890–91) in Viborg, Jutland; the Aarhus Theatre (1898–1900); Marselisborg Palace (built 1899–1902 as a wedding gift from the people to Crown Prince Christian (later Christian X); the extension to the Ny Carlsberg Glyptotek in Copenhagen; and the Copenhagen Police Headquarters, Copenhagen (1918–1922).

Kampmann was initially one of the leading Danish proponents of National Romantic style. However, during the 1920s he adopted the Nordic Classicism style, becoming one of its main initiators. One of his more notable works is one of the culminations of the style, the Police Headquarters in Copenhagen (1918–22) (in a team with Aage Rafn, Holger Jacobsen and F. Fredriksen) was among the initiators of 1920s Nordic Classicism. This last building was completed after his death in summer 1920 by his two sons, Christian and Hans Jørgen Kampmann, together with Rafn. Kampmann also was responsible for a number of building restoration projects, notably Aarhus Cathedral (1907–20).

As professor of architecture at the architecture department of the Royal Danish Academy of Fine Arts from 1908 to 1918 he lectured on domestic architecture as well as the great architecture of the world, especially the visual effects of the Greek temple. In his watercolours he managed to capture the overall impression; the characteristic "wet style" seen in the watercolours of Aage Rafn, Steen Eiler Rasmussen and Aarne Jacobsen goes back to Kampmann. Kampmann is one of the most influential architects in Danish architectural history.

== Awards ==
He was made a Knight of the Order of the Dannebrog (1897), awarded Dannebrogsmann (1906) and the King's Medal of Merit in Gold (1900).

== Personal life ==
He was married during 1888 to Johanne Holm (1868–1920). He died during 1920 in Copenhagen and was buried at Vestre Kirkegård.

== The buildings and restoration works ==
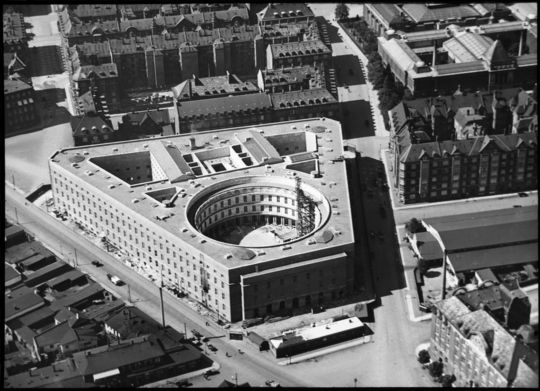
Copenhagen Police Headquarters, 1924.

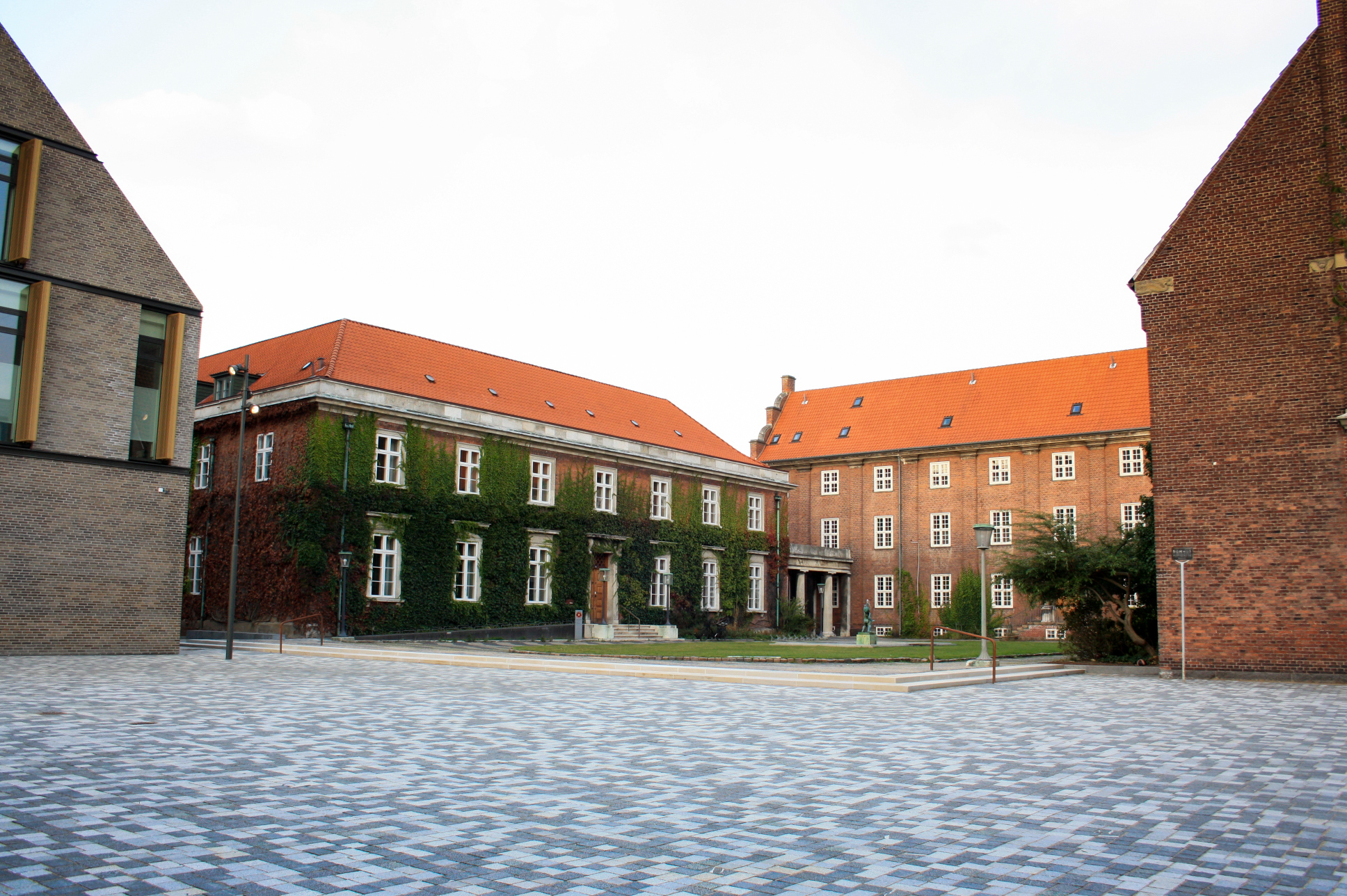
Frederiksberg Courthouse, 1921.

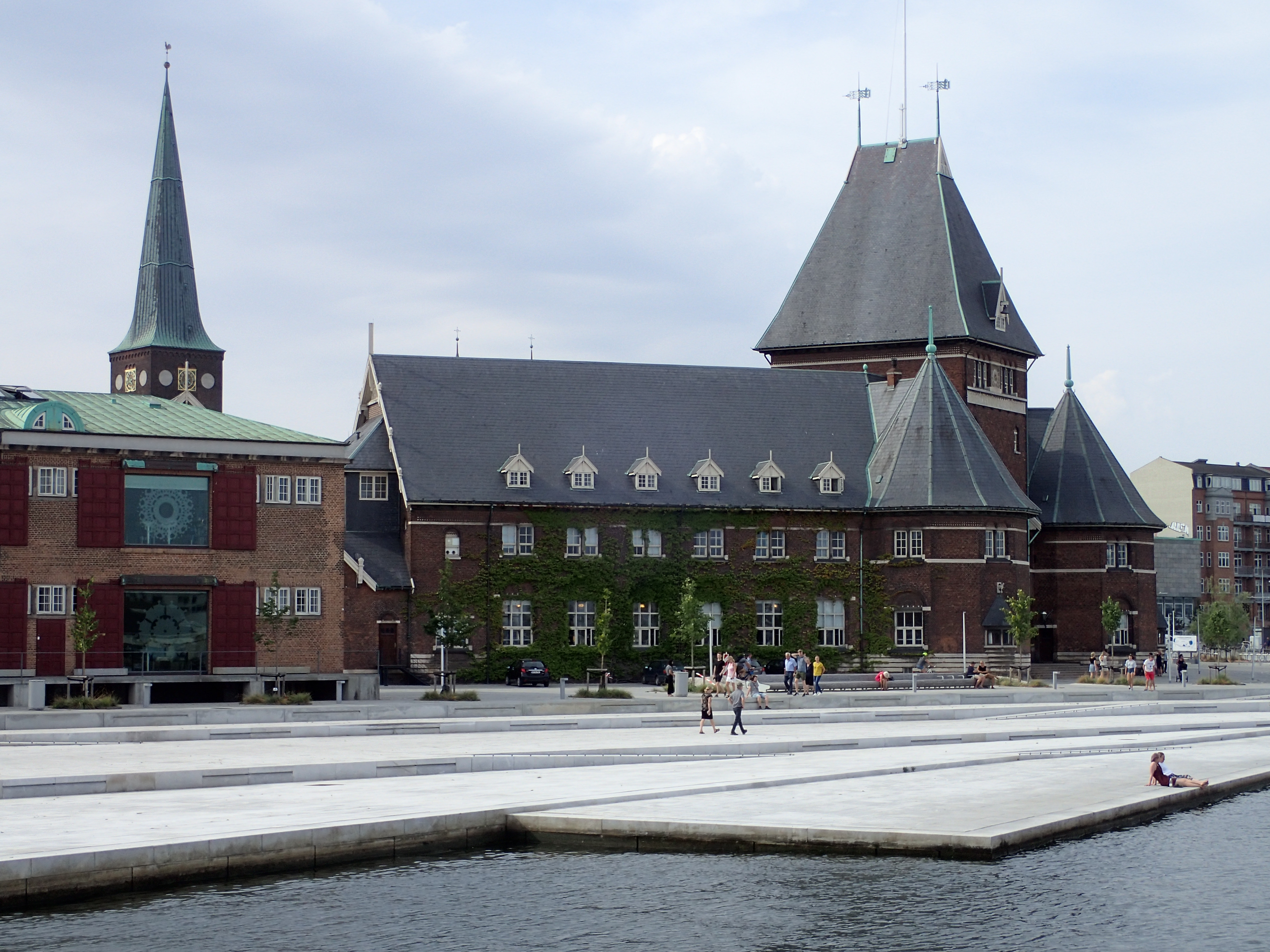
Aarhus Customs House

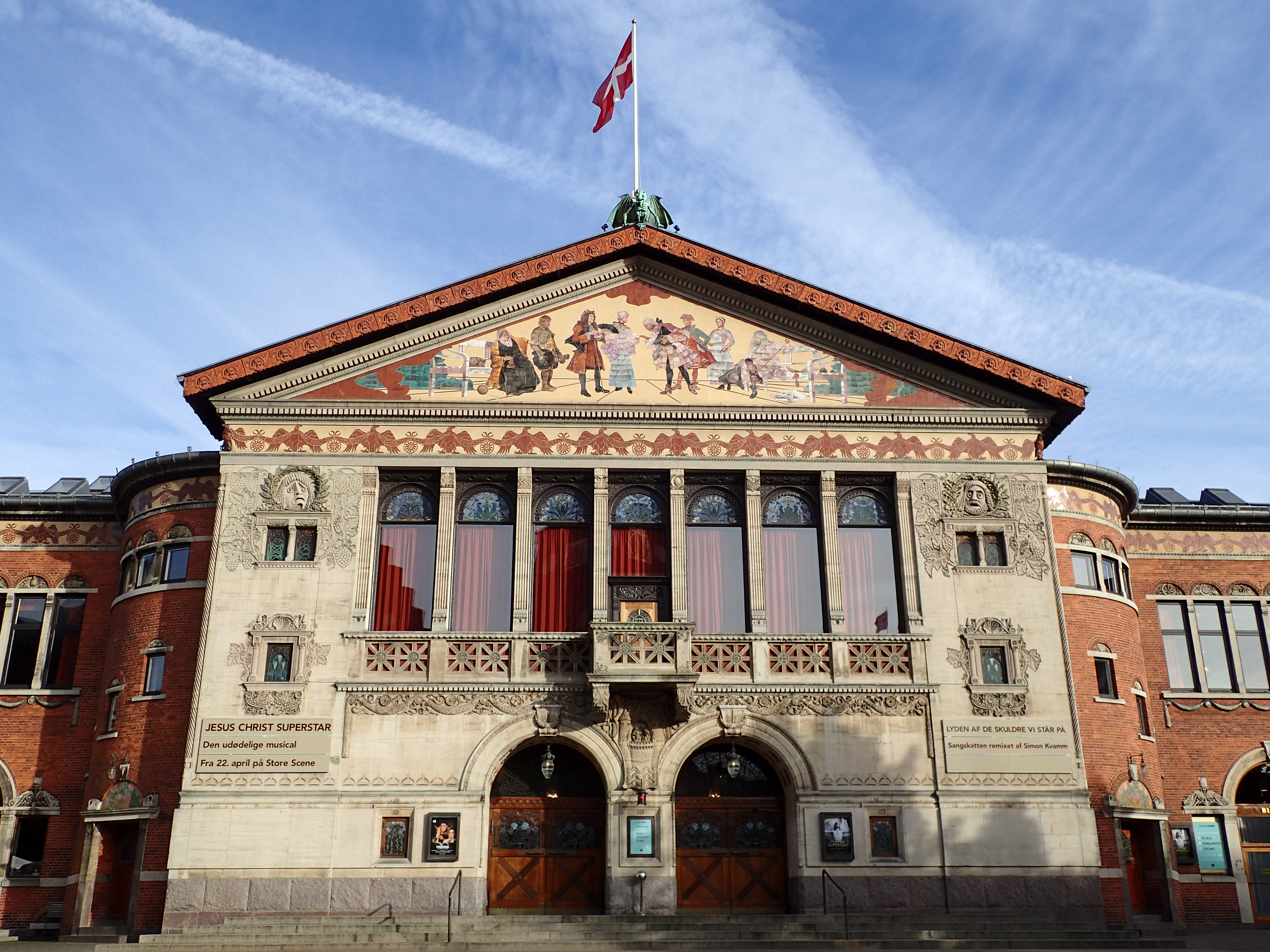
Aarhus Theatre

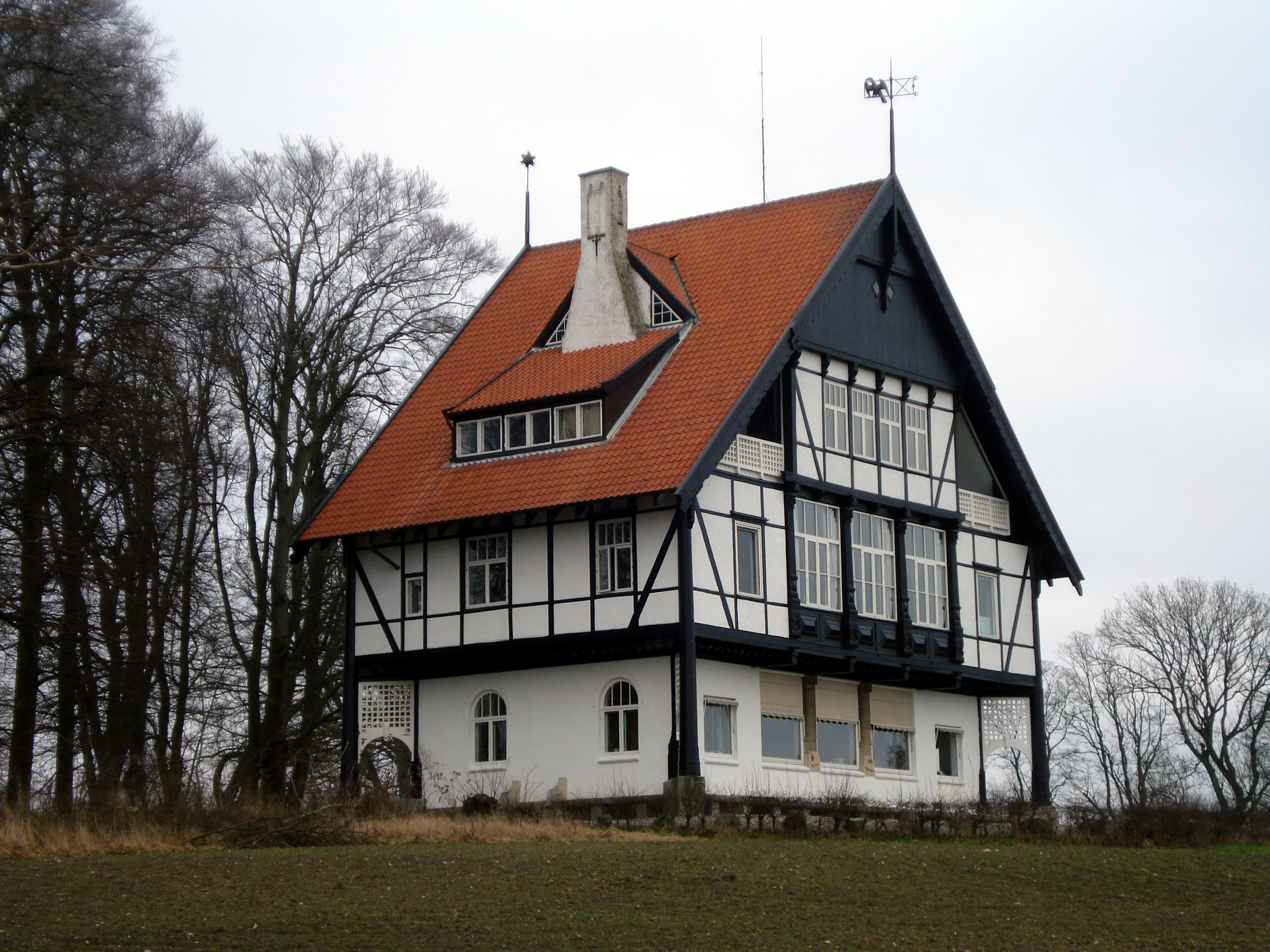
Hunting lodge, Kalø Hovedgård manor house

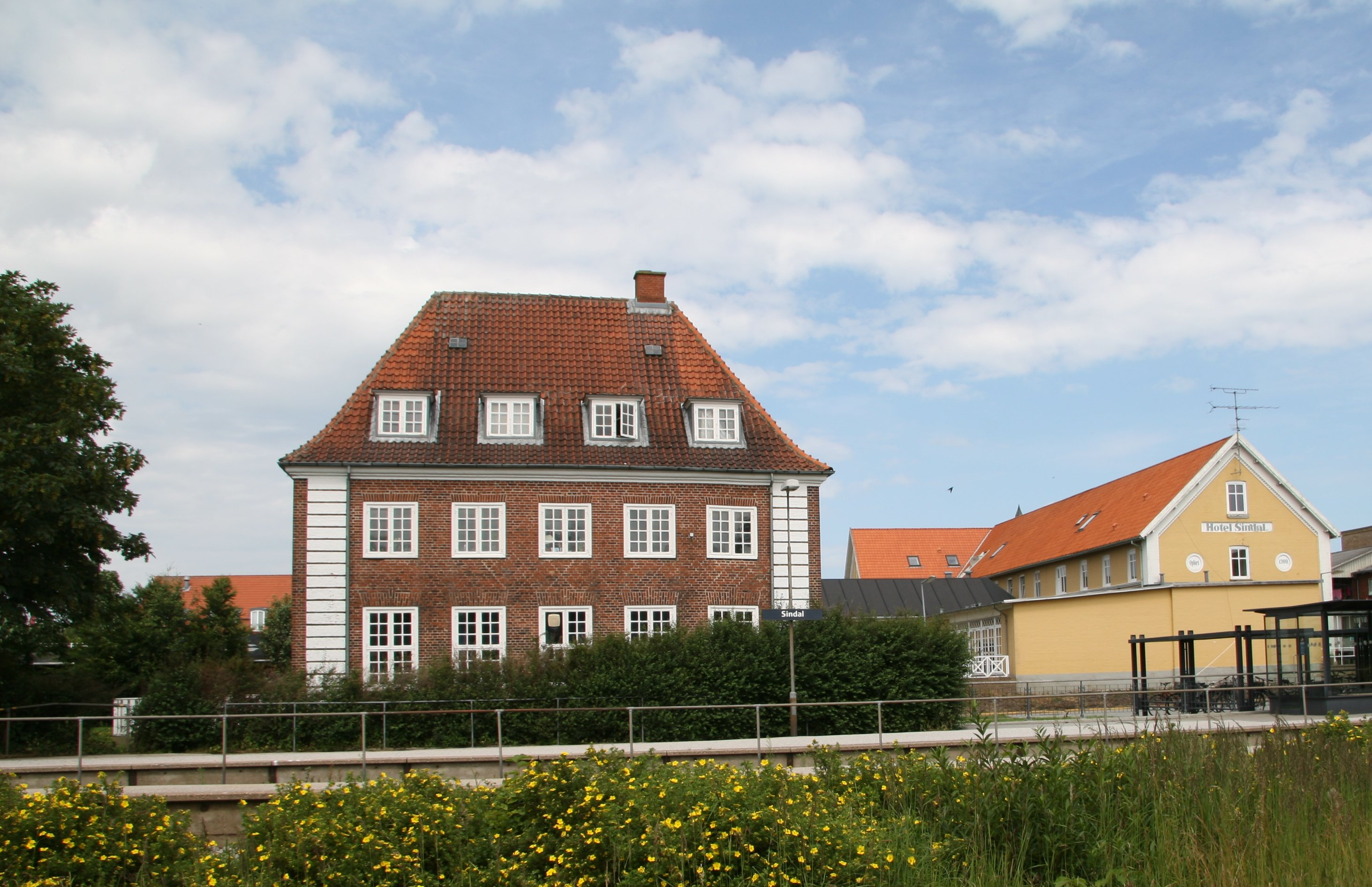
Sindal Post Office

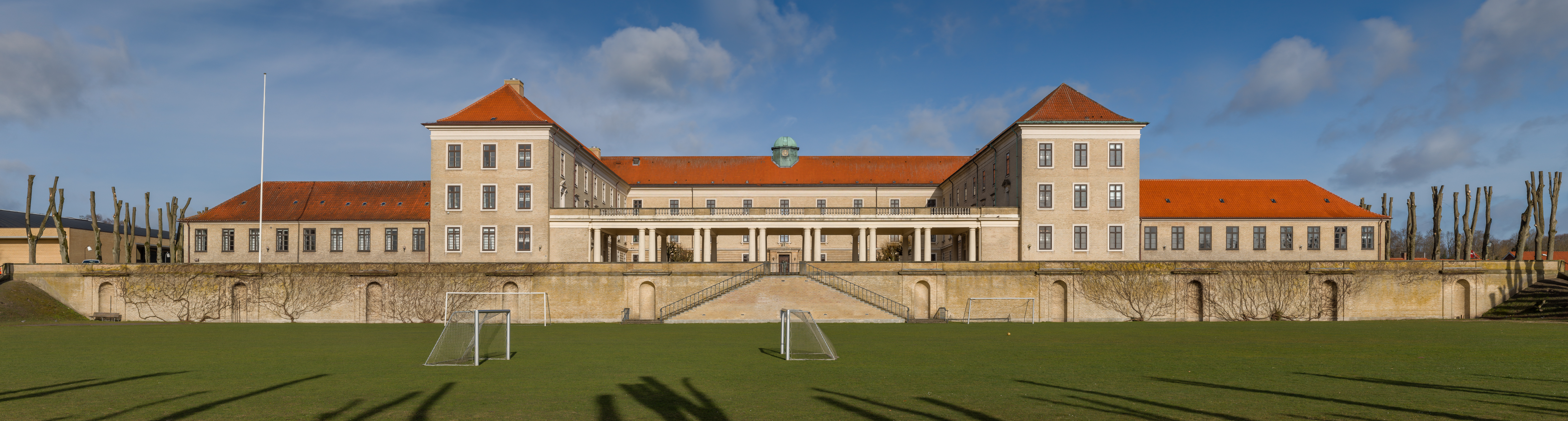
Viborg Cathedral School

- Villa Miramare for William Salomonsen, Vedbaek (1887–88)
- Central Hospital, Hjørring (1888–90)
- North Jutland Provincial Archives, nowadays North Jutland State Archives, Viborg (1889–91)
- Stege Rectory, Stege (1891–93)
- Technical College, Hjørring (1891)
- Brewer Carl Jacobsen's villa at Ny Carlsberg, Copenhagen (1890)
- The refurbishment and extension of the first Ny Carlsberg Glyptotek, Copenhagen (c. 1890–95)
- Savings Bank, Hjørring (1894)
- Aarhus Custom House, Aarhus (1895–97)
- Hunting lodge and refurbishment of main building, Kalø Hovedgård manor house (ca. 1897)
- Aarhus Theatre (1897–1900, with Karl Hansen Reistrup)
- Development plan for the Marselisborg Castle estate, Aarhus (1898, with city engineer Charles Ambt)
- Aarhus City Library, formerly the National Business Archives, Aarhus (1898–1902)
- Marselisborg Palace, Aarhus (1899–1902)
- Grey House (1901)
- Extension of the Ny Carlsberg Glyptotek Art Museum, Copenhagen (1901–06, following an architecture competition)
- Office and laboratory building, Ny Carlsberg Glyptotek, Copenhagen (1901)
- Villa Kampen, Aarhus (1901–02)
- St. Johannes Church (1902–1905)
- Post and Telegraph building, Aarhus (1903–05)
- Main building, Rye Nørskov estate, Ry (1904–06)
- Jutland Business School, nowadays Aarhus Business College, Aarhus (1904–05)
- Extension to Aarhuus Private Bank, Aarhus (1905, demolished 1929)
- New construction and renovation, Aarhus Cathedral School, Aarhus (1905–06)
- Credit Finance building, Viborg (1905–06, with Valdemar Schmidt)
- Skagen Customs House, Skagen (1907–1908)
- Aalborg Post and Telegraph Office, Aalborg (1908–10)
- Plan for a Station town and Governor's House, National Exhibition of 1909 in Aarhus (demolished)
- Governor's House, Hjørring, (1909–10)
- Summer residence of Mr. Christian Kampmann, Lønstrup (1909, demolished)
- Customs House, Viborg (1910, demolished)
- Hornslet Police Station, Hornslet (1910)
- Langå Post Office, Langå (1910)
- Hurup Post Office, Hurup (1910)
- Hadsten Post Office, Hadsten (1910)
- Sindal Post Office, Sindal (1911)
- Horsens Customs House, now the headquarters for the company Bestseller Horsens (1911–13)
- New tower, St. Sørens Church, Ry (1911–12)
- King Christian IX's and queen Louise's sepulchre, Roskilde Cathedral (1911 – ca. 1919)
- Basin for Rudolph Tegner's Dance Fountain, Rosenborg Castle Gardens (1913, nowadays in Helsingør)
- Løgstør Post Office, Løgstør (1913–18)
- Frederikshavn Customs House, Frederikshavn (1913–15)
- Estate for Christian Kampmann, Århus (1916)
- Police Headquarters, Frederiksberg (ca. 1915, following an architectural competition)
- Viborg Cathedral School (1915–26, with Christian Kampmann and Johannes Frederiksen)
- Viborg Post Office, Viborg (1916)
- State Examination Institute, Copenhagen (1916–19, demolished 1995)
- Randers state school (1918–26, with Christian Kampmann and Johannes Frederiksen)
- Skørping Post Office, Skørping (1918)
- Cordial Teater, Stortingsgatan 16, Oslo (1918)
- St. Paul's Church, Hadsten (1918–19, with Hans Jørgen Kampmann)
- Copenhagen Police Headquarters, Copenhagen (1918–24, with Aage Rafn, Christian and Hans Jørgen Kampmann, Holger Jacobsen and Anton Frederiksen)
- Brædstrup Post Office, Brædstrup (1919–21)
- Frederiksberg Courthouse, Frederiksberg (1919–21)
- Conversion of Aalborghus Castle (1919–20)
- Refurbishment and extension of Palstrup manor house, Viborg (1919)
- New tower and porch, Kongens Thisted Church (1920)
- Silkeborg Customs House, nowadays a post office, Drewsensvej, Silkeborg (1920, with Christian Kampmann)
- Ebeltoft Customs House, nowadays Ebeltoft Museum (1921, with Christian Kampmann)
- Extension to Horsens state school

=== Restoration works ===
- Sneslev Church (1889–91)
- Helligåndshuset, Randers (1894)
- Thisted Church (1895)
- Extension and restoration of Nørresundby Church (1897–98)
- Skive old church (1898)
- Restoration and extension of Budolfi Church, Aalborg (1899–1910)
- Aalborg Kloster, Adelgade (1904–07)
- Aarhus Cathedral (1907–20)

== Gallery ==
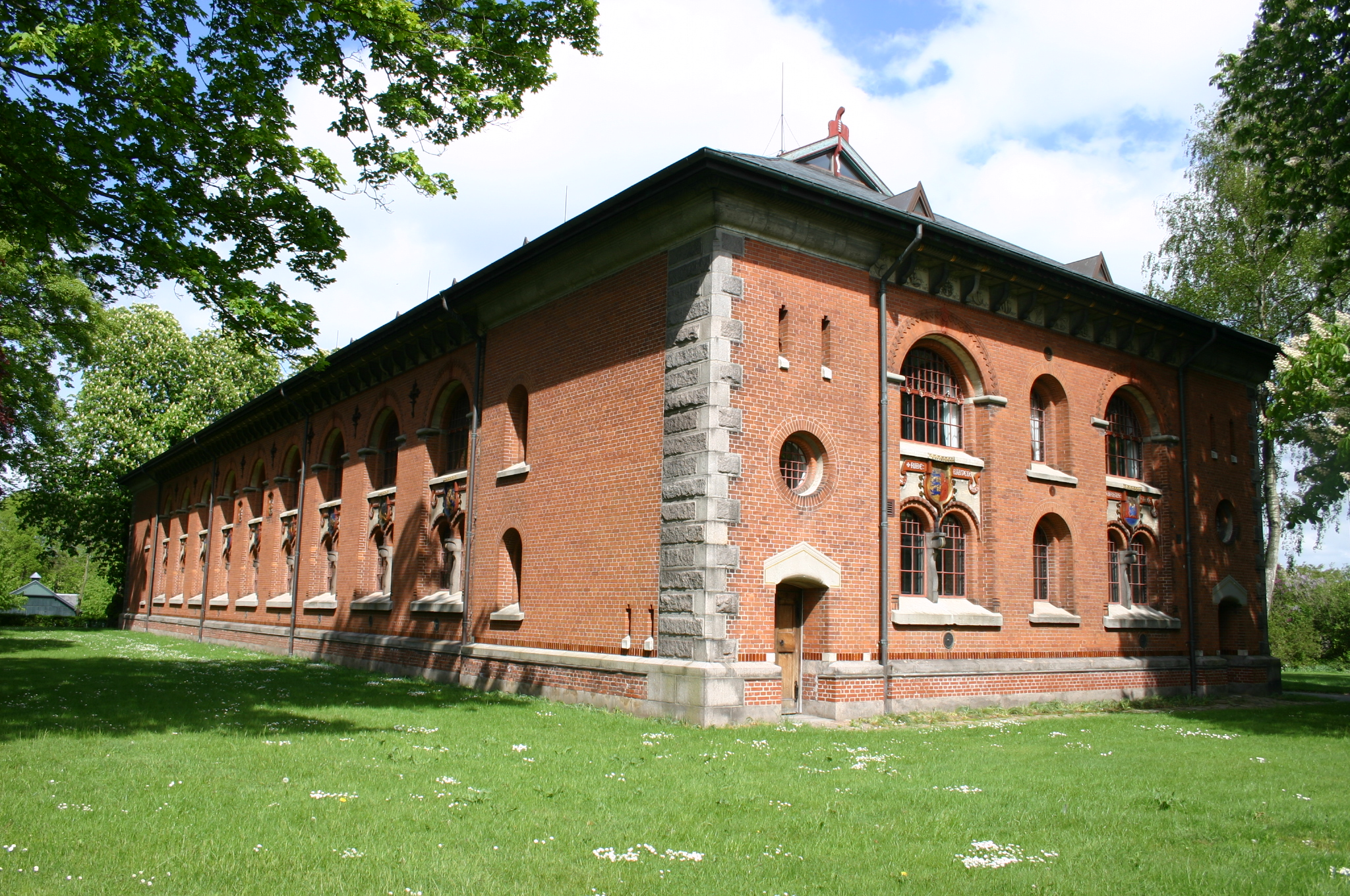
North Jutland State Archives

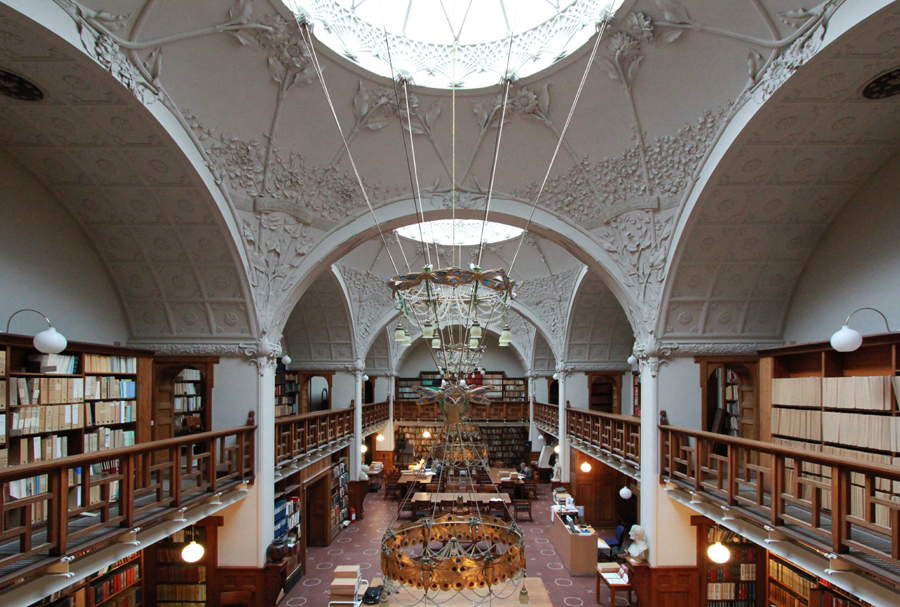
Former Aarhus City Library

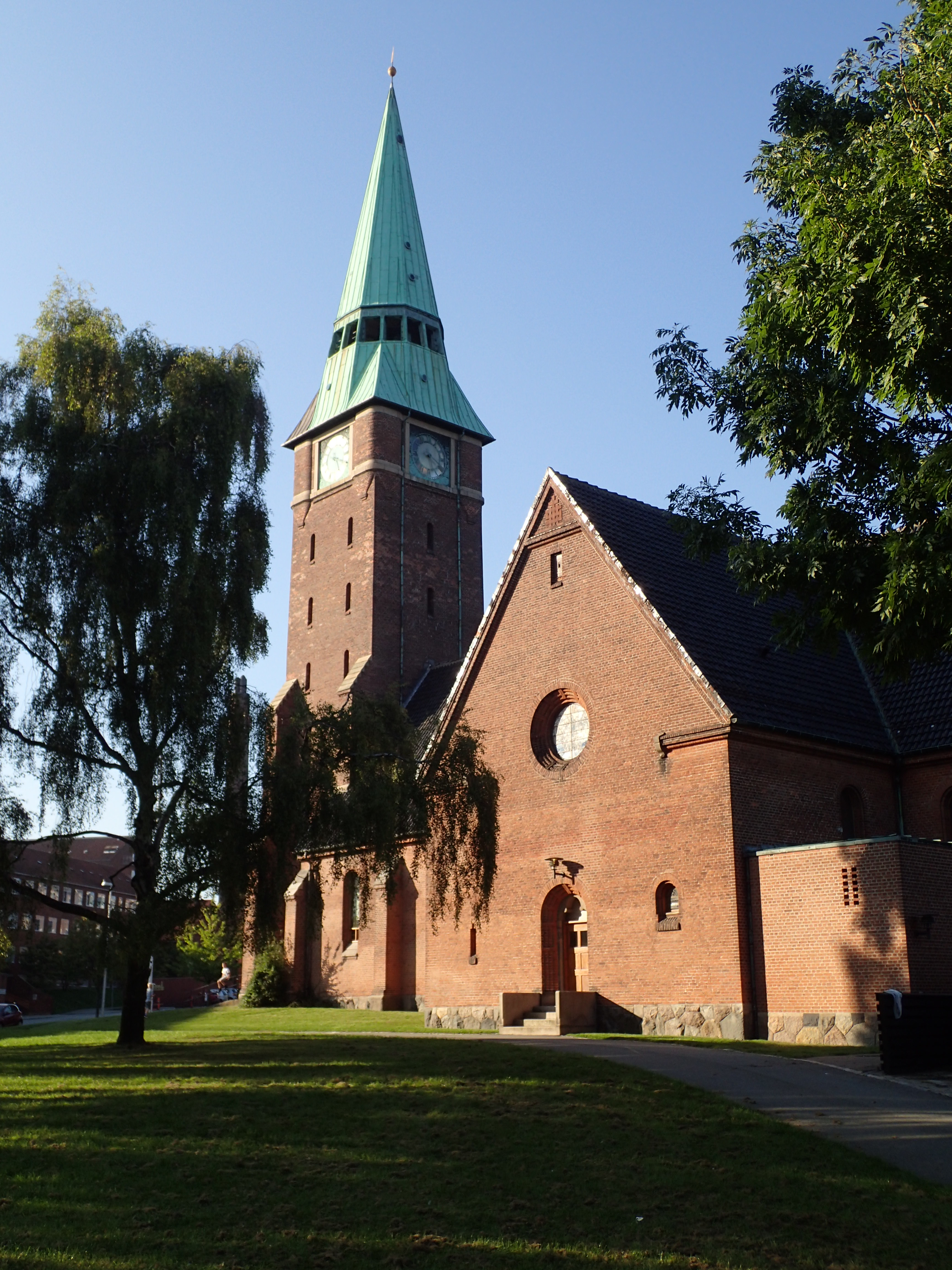
St. Johannes Church, Aarhus

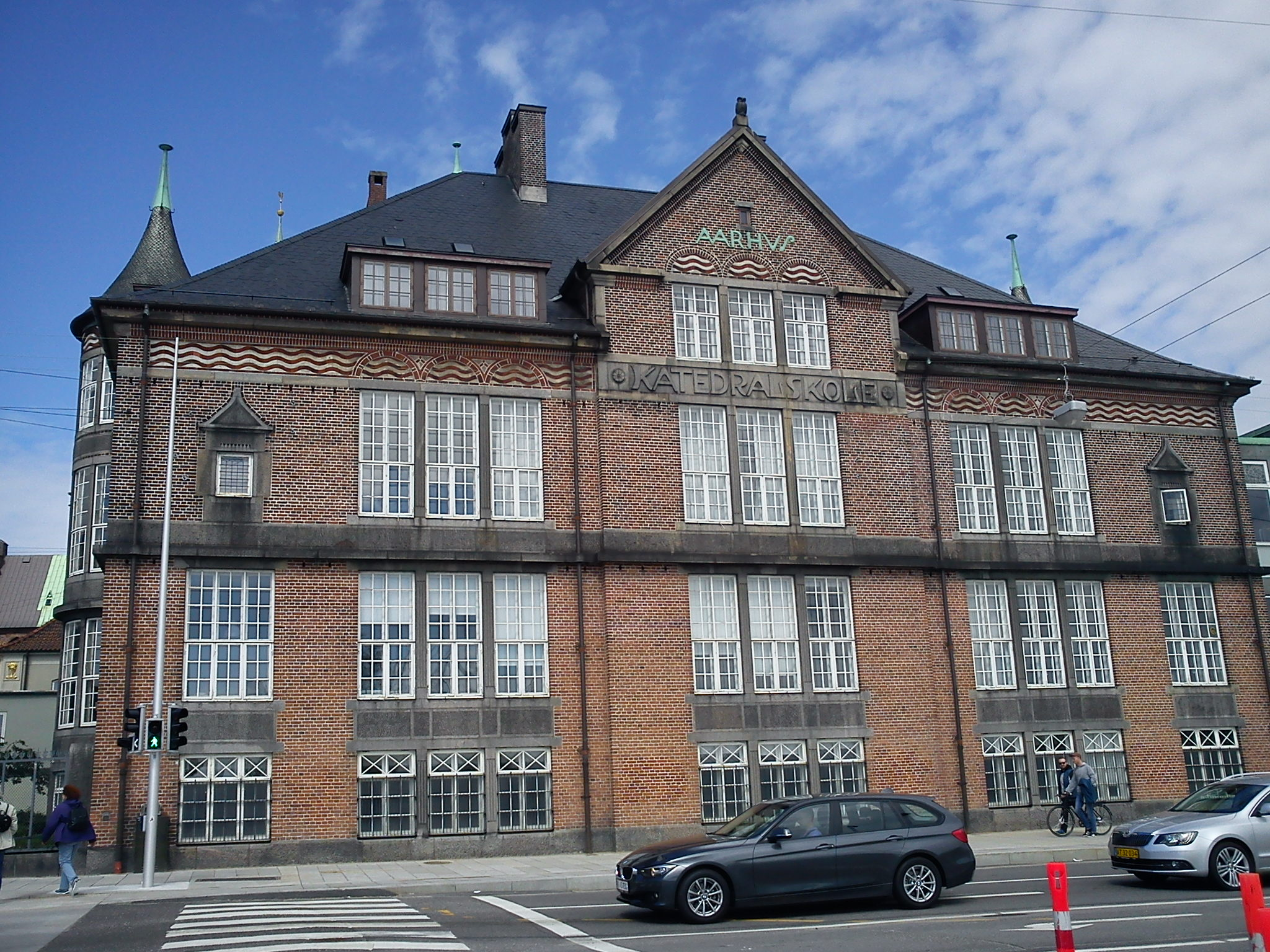
Aarhus Cathedral School, black-roofed brick building.

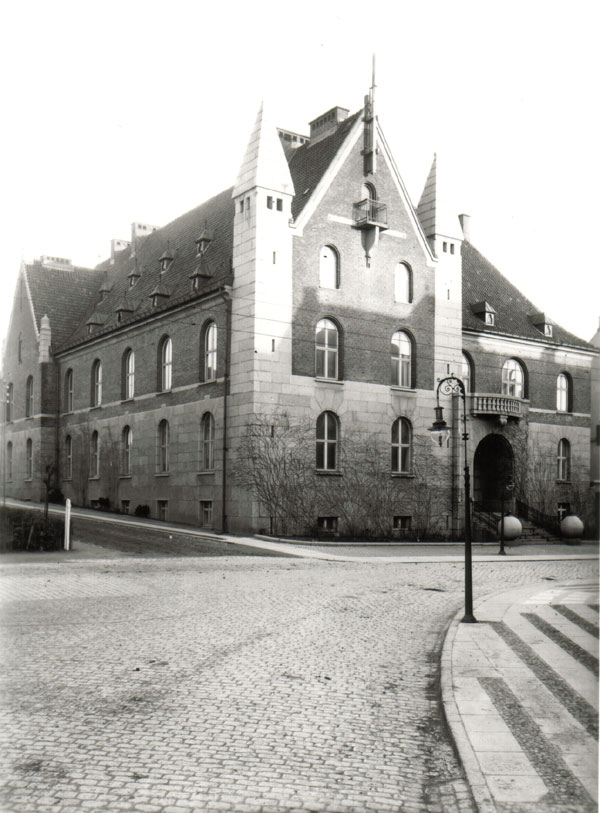
Credit finance building, Viborg

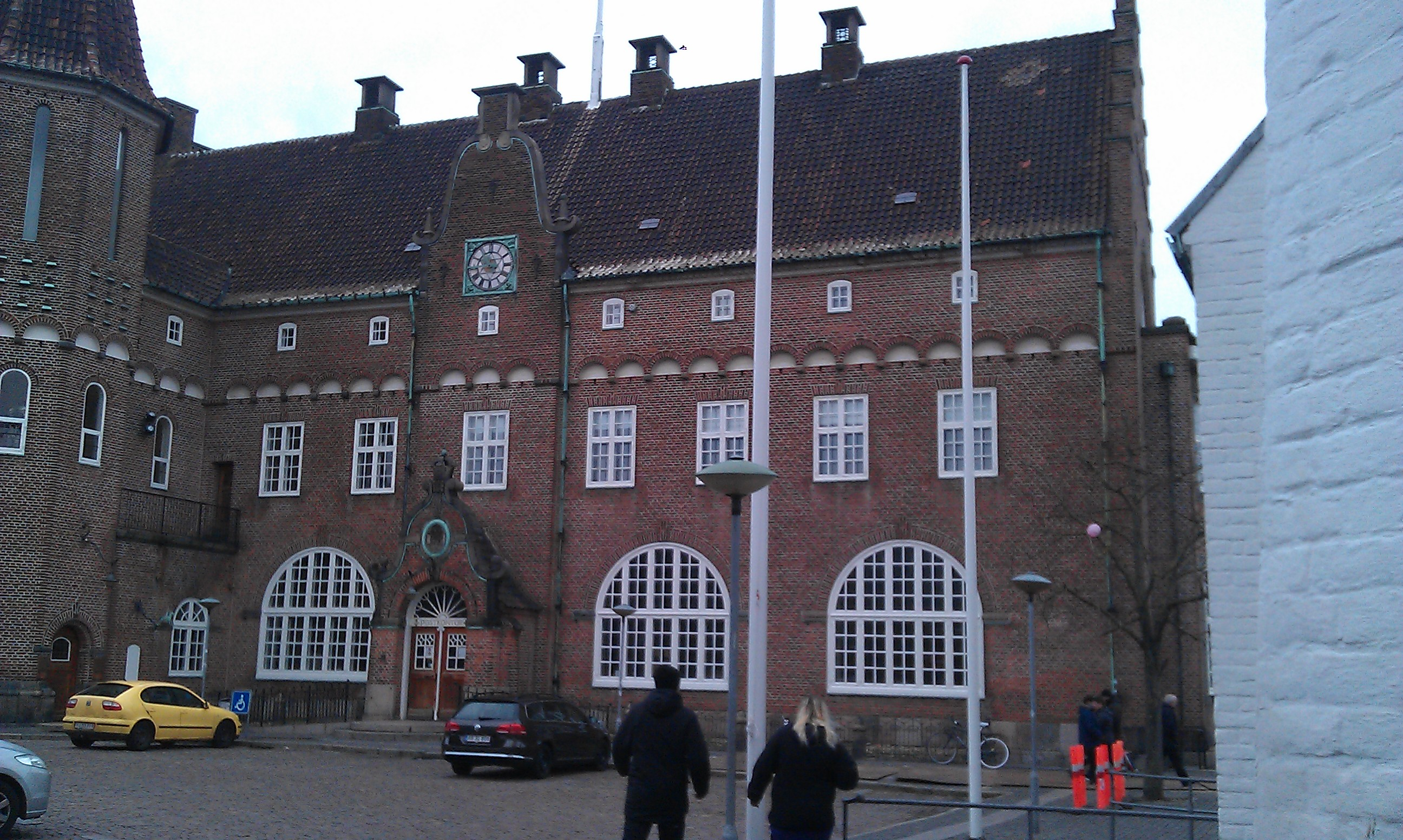
Aalborg Post Office

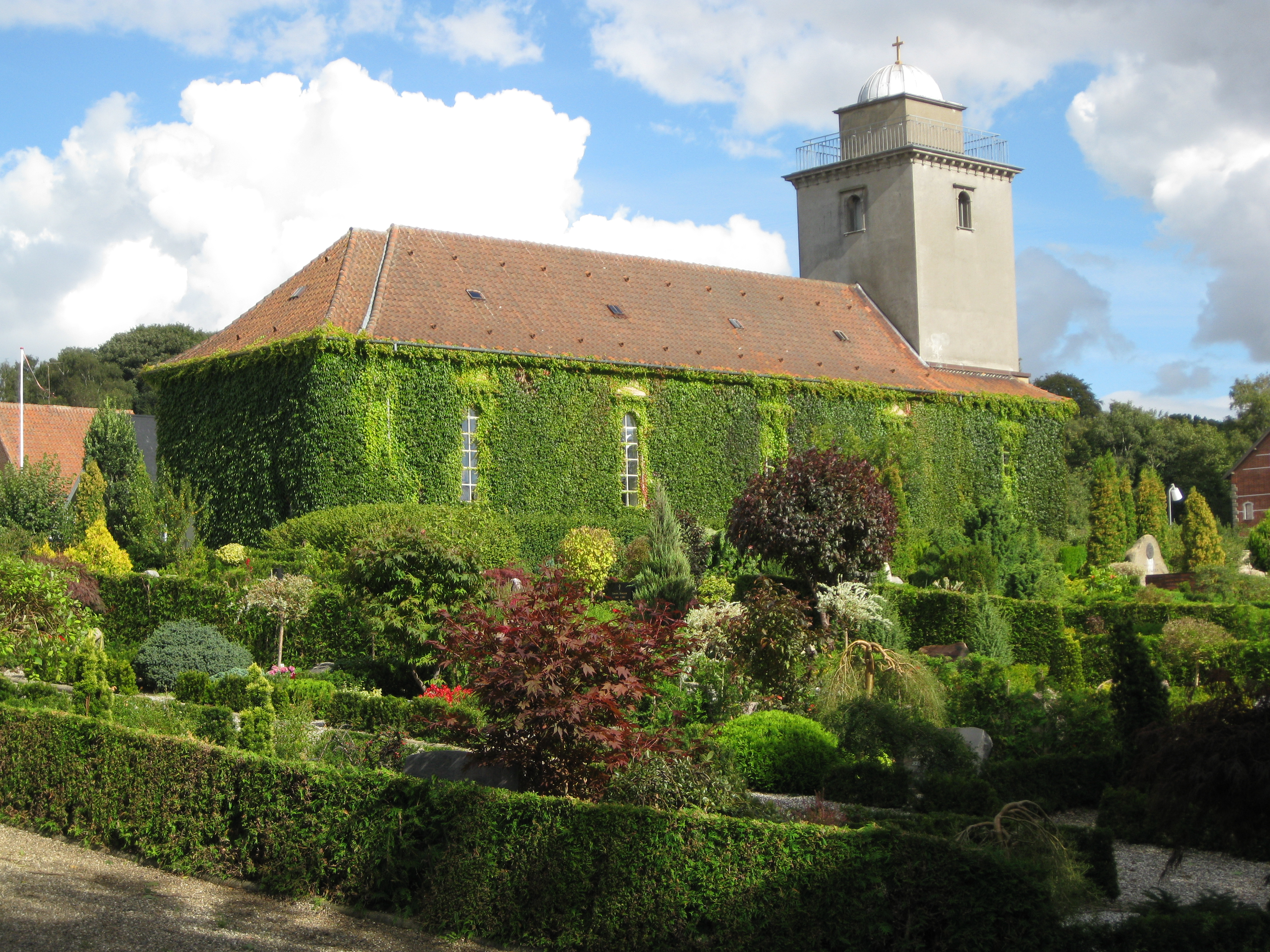
St Paul's Church, Hadsten

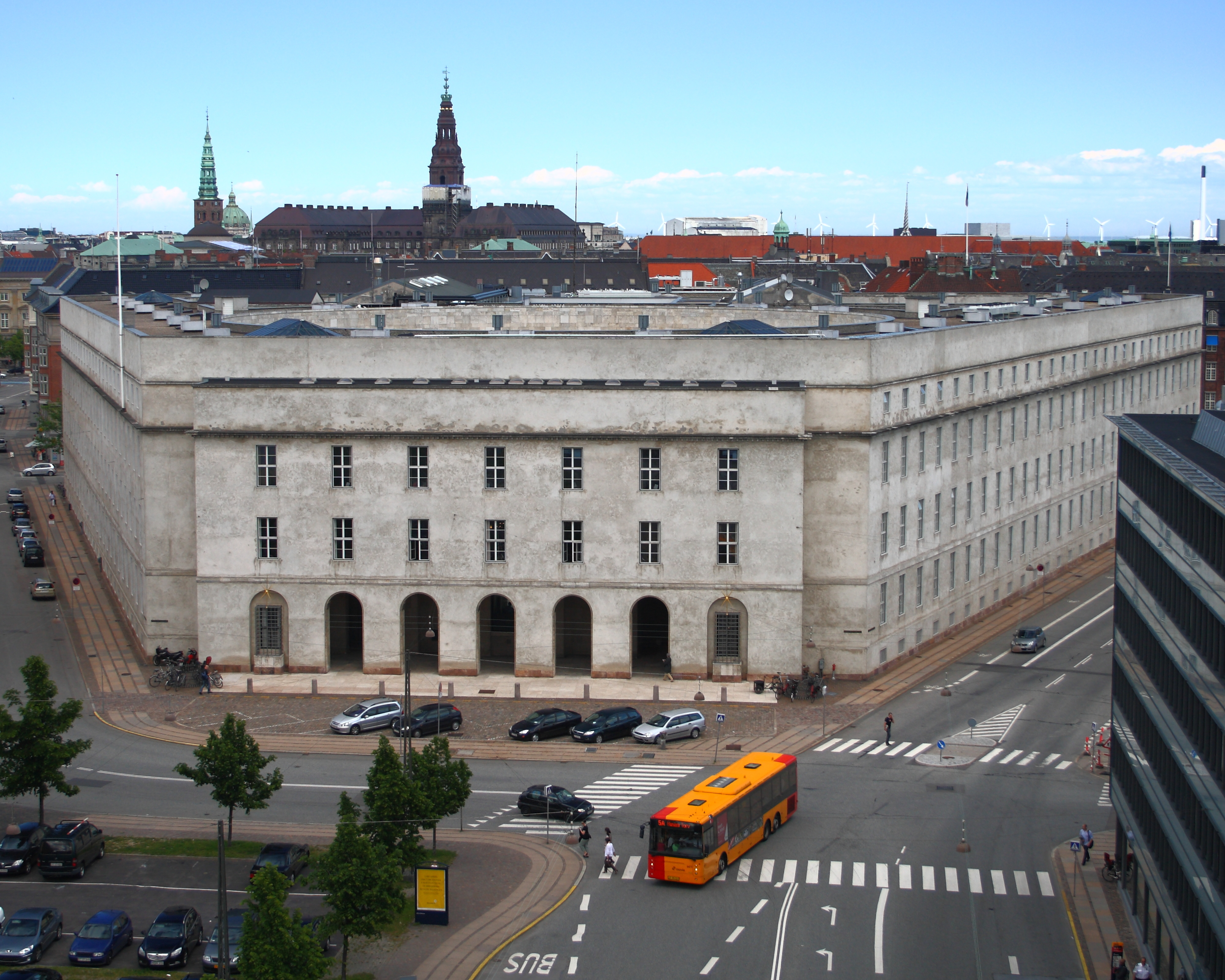
Copenhagen Police Headquarters

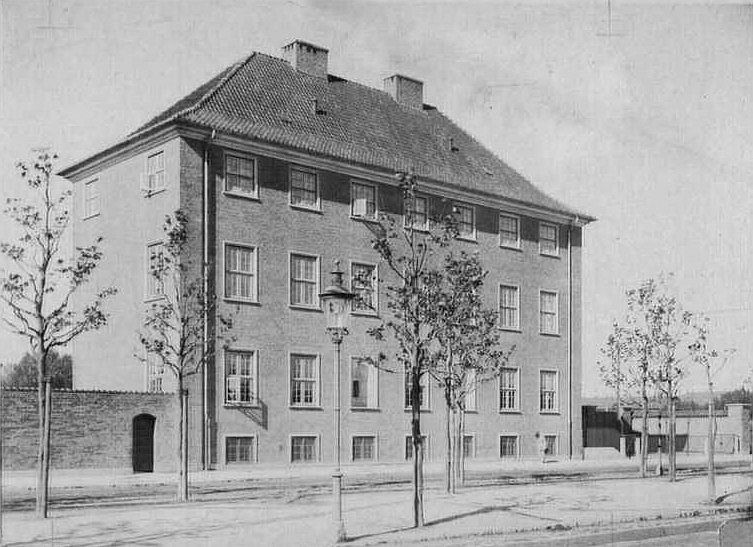
State Examination Institute, Copenhagen (demolished 1995)

== Other sources ==
- Johan Bender (2014) Arkitekt Hack Kampmann (Forlaget Klematis) ISBN 9788771390834
