= Aarhus Theatre =

Theatre in Aarhus, Denmark

Coordinates: 56°9′21″N 10°12′39″E

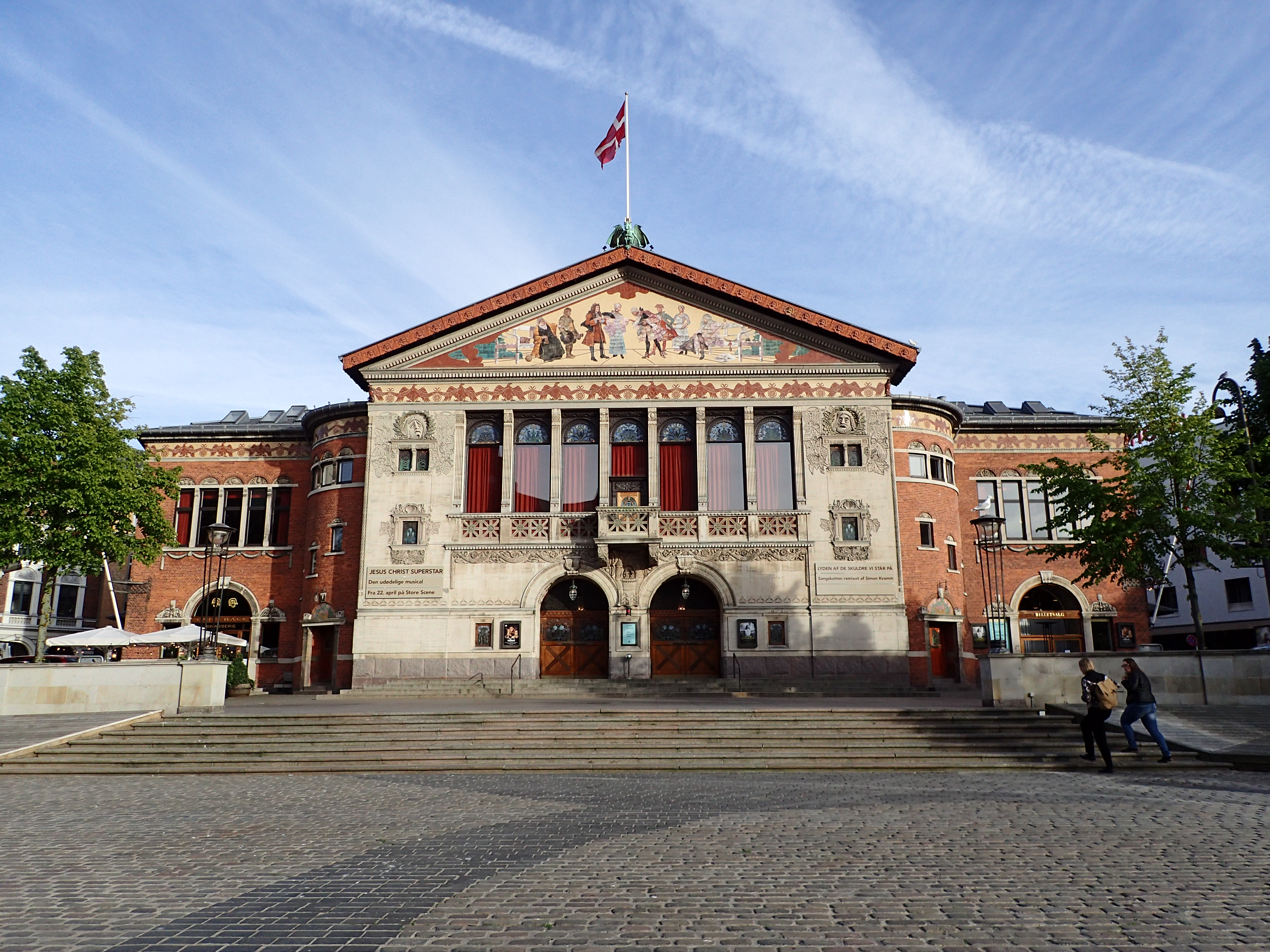
Aarhus Theatre

The Aarhus Theatre (Danish: Aarhus Teater) in Aarhus, is the largest provincial theatre in Denmark.

== Building ==
The present Aarhus Theatre building was constructed in the late 19th century, as a replacement for the old theatre, nicknamed "Svedekassen" (The Sweat-box). After Aarhus had grown to become Jutland's biggest city during the 19th century, the old theatre became too small to serve the public demand. A new building was designed by the Danish architect Hack Kampmann (1856–1920), and the construction began on 12 August 1898. Only two years later, Aarhus Theatre stood completed and was inaugurated on 15 September 1900.

The architectural style of the building is Art Nouveau, with the national romantic emphasis on natural materials, and the interior design was completed by artists Hansen Reistrup and Hans Tegner.

In 2007, the Aarhus Theatre received an audio make-over.

== Aarhus Theatre Schools ==
Aarhus Theatre also has an acting academy (skuespilskolen), which offers four-year programs for students to train in acting, and a playwriting school (dramatikeruddannelsen). In 2015 both schools were amalgamated with four other performing arts schools, to form the Danish National School of Performing Arts.

Alumni of the school include:

- Kirsten Lehfeldt (1976)
- Søren Pilmark (1977)
- Charlotte Fich (1989)
- Ellen Hillingsø (1994)
- Jens Jacob Tychsen (1998)
- Jacob Lohmann (2002)
- Josephine Park (2014)
