= Graven, Aarhus =

Street in Aarhus, Denmark

Graven
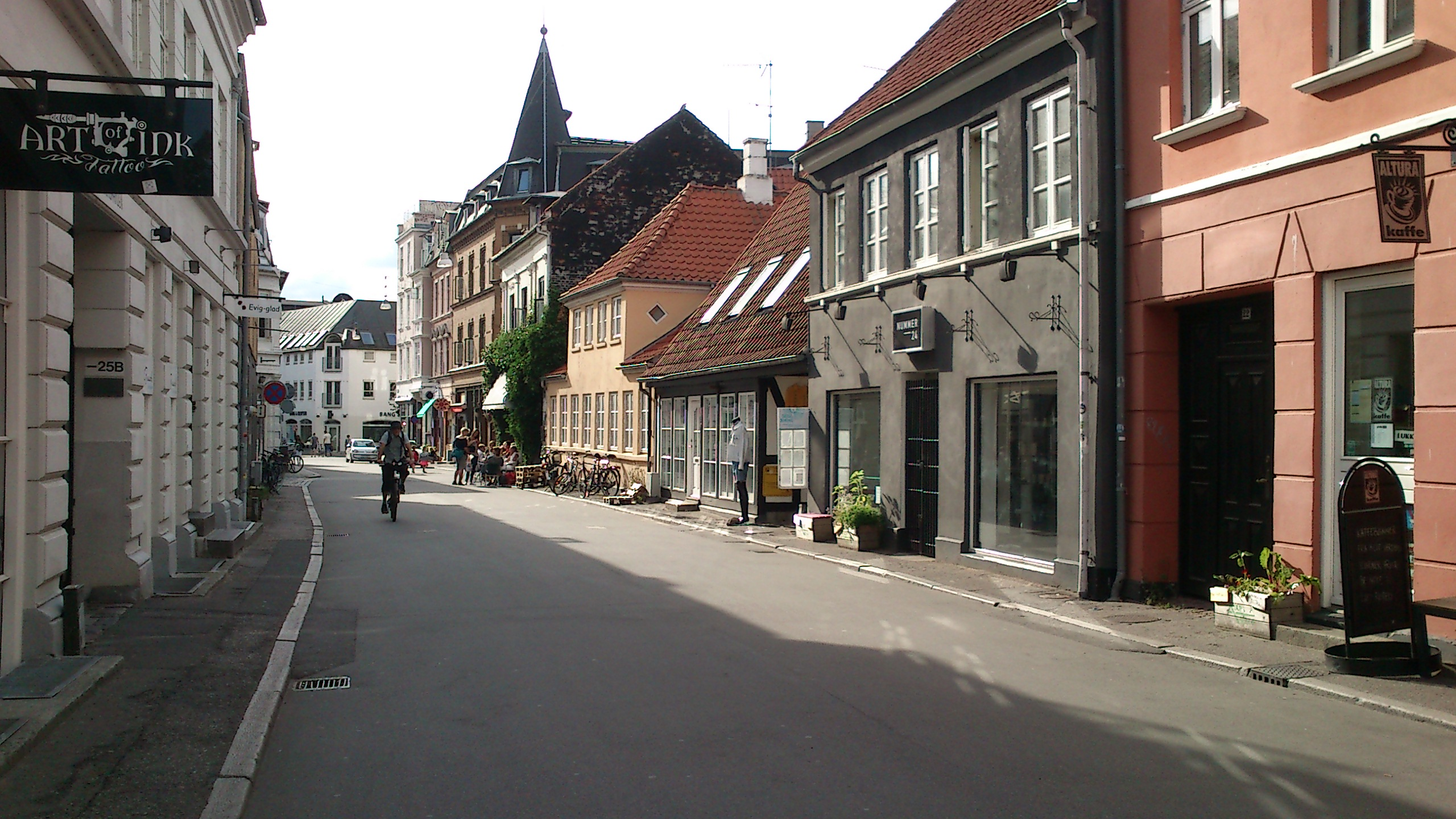
- Graven
- Former name(s): Gravene
- Length: 220 m (720 ft)
- Location: Latin Quarter, Aarhus, Denmark
- Postal code: 8000
- Coordinates: 56°09′31.3″N 10°12′37.7″E

Graven is a street in Aarhus, Denmark. Graven was created some time before year 1500 on and in the northernmost moat used to defend the early Viking settlement. It is one of the oldest streets in the city and used to mark the northern city limits along with Klostergade. Graven runs 220 meter west to east from Klostergade to Mejlgade and is situated in the historic Latin Quarter neighborhood. Graven is fairly narrow and is a designated one-way street for motorized traffic in the direction of Mejlgade towards Klostergade. Graven is characterized by low housing, cafés and speciality shops, and has much foot and bicycle traffic. As Klostergade and Mejlgade, Graven is a shared bikeway, part of the city's bicycle infrastructure network.

== Etymology ==
The earliest name of the street was "Gravene", meaning "the moats" or "the digs", referring to the previous moats around Aarhus, dug as part of the Viking town fortifications. The moats, the ramparts and the palisades were all dismantled, but carried over in some street names. The singular "Graven", which names the street today, is known from the late 1500s. The pronunciation of the name today still references the original plural name as the first syllable is pronounced with a long "a" as if it was the plural case.

== History ==
The early Viking settlement was fortified by moats and ramparts to the north, west and south. During the Middle Ages the city grew beyond the boundaries marked by these defenses and at the same time advancements in warfare had made them less useful in potential military conflicts. Some time before 1500, the ramparts and moats were dismantled and the street Graven was established on and in the northernmost moat. It is believed the moat was filled in using earth from an adjoining rampart. Graven became an extension of Klostergade which had previously been the northmost street in the city. In 1914, the city council hotly debated whether to lengthen Graven to newly built port facilities south of the city. The plan would entail demolishing Juuls Gaard and another property in Mejlgade. The later mayor Jakob Jensen argued against the plans as insufficient. In the end it was decided to wait for the Goods Station to be relocated to the west of the city and for the river to be paved over and the new street Åboulevarden to be established. The changes proved sufficient and Graven kept its original medieval structure.

Today, Graven is reminiscent of a typical European medieval street with low dense housing and a somewhat curved alignment. The majority of the buildings are from the 19th century interspersed with medieval half-timbered structures.

== Buildings ==
Graven no. 21 was designed and built by architect Carl Lange in 1876 and commissioned by the city to house a social institution but since 1917 it was home to the municipal dental care facilities for public school.
