= Skolegade =

Street in Aarhus, Denmark

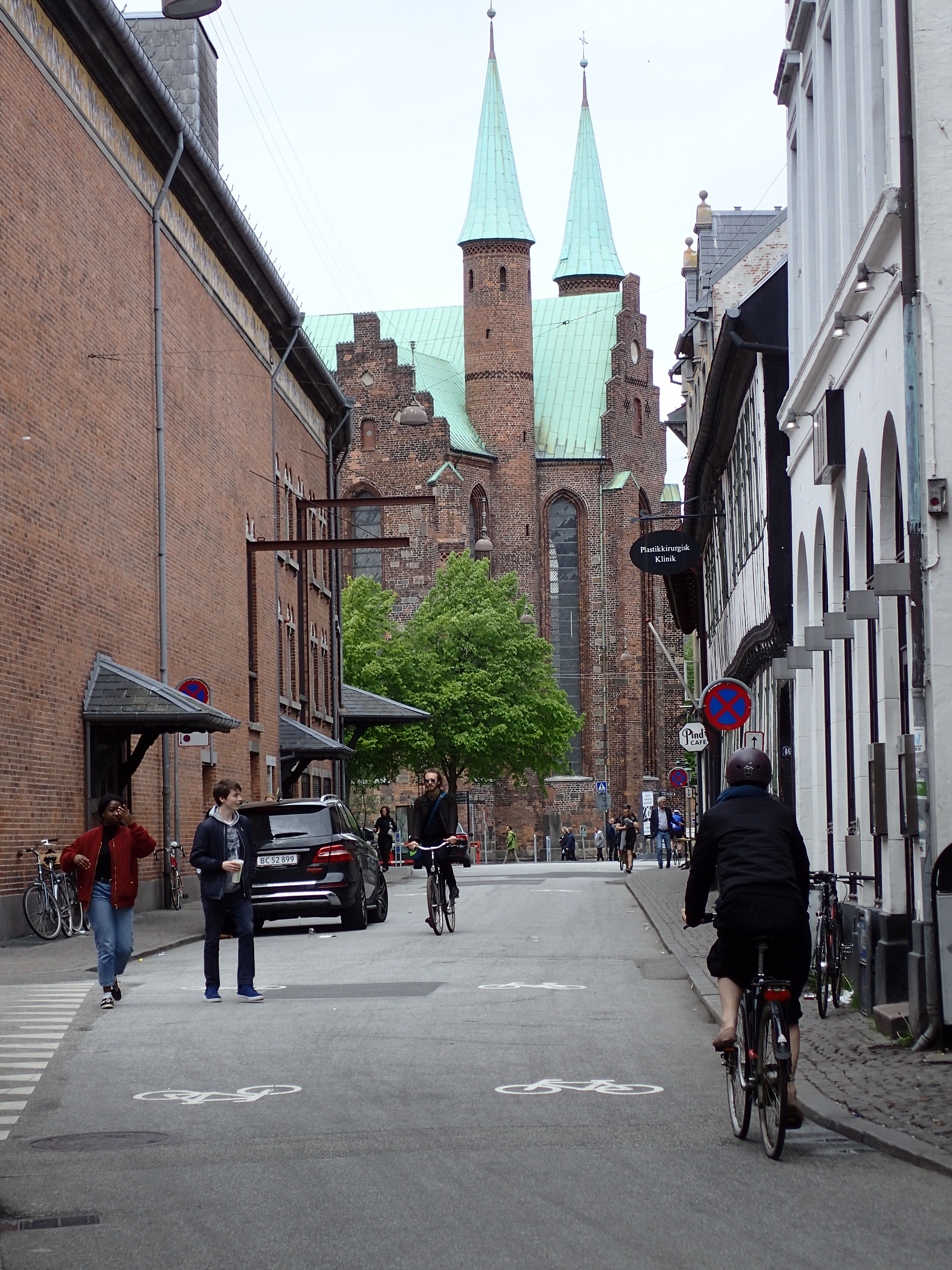
- Skolegade in Aarhus
- Interactive map of Skolegade
- Length: 222 m (728 ft)
- Location: Midtbyen, Aarhus, Denmark
- Postal code: 8000
- Coordinates: 56°09′19.6″N 10°12′41.2″E

Skolegade (Lit.: School Street) is a street in Aarhus, Denmark which runs north to south from Mejlgade to Mindebrogade. The street is situated in the Midtbyen neighborhood. Skolegade is home to two listed buildings and runs past the Aarhus Theater. Skolegade is an area with many bars and eateries, and it has a lively nightlife. The street is from at least medieval times with many historic buildings.

== History ==
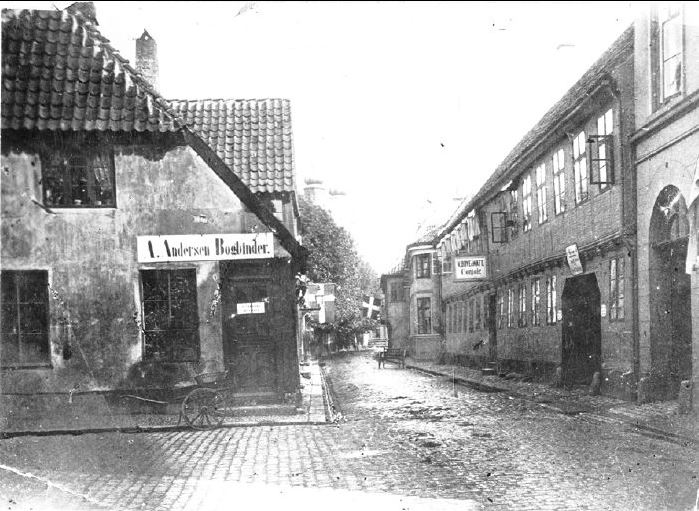
Skolegade, 1877

Skolegade is one of the oldest streets in Aarhus. The name is derived from Aarhus Katedralskole, which was originally located on the street since it was established in the 1100s. In the old medieval town, it was one of the most heavily trafficked streets, used by people from north and east of the town going to the market on Store Torv. In 1849 newspaper articles mention it as the most heavily used street in the city.

Into the mid-1800s the gardens of the houses in Skolegade extended to the harbor and coastline. In early times the harbor was only a series of small piers along the river and bay but this changed when Havnegade was established along the coast. Initially as a narrow path and later as a proper street which was first named in 1880. In 1827 the first sea-bath in the city was established in Skolegade 52.

== Buildings ==
Skolegade gets its name from Aarhus Katedralskole which was previously situated on the street. Today the section with the school is a part of Mejlgade resulting in no schools actually being on Skolegade. There are two listed buildings in Skolegade from 1577 and 1802 respectively. The 1577 building was used as a barracks prior to the construction of the Langelandsgade and Vester Allé Barracks in the late 1800s. It has also served as a prison and storehouse. It is a single, long wing facing the street, Half-timbered with a ridged roof. The 1802 building is also a half-timbered structure in a characteristic white/black color scheme. It was used for public administration in conjunction with the nearby City Hall of 1857–1941.
