= Aarhus Katedralskole =

School in Aarhus, Denmark

Coordinates: 56.1570°N 10.2123°E

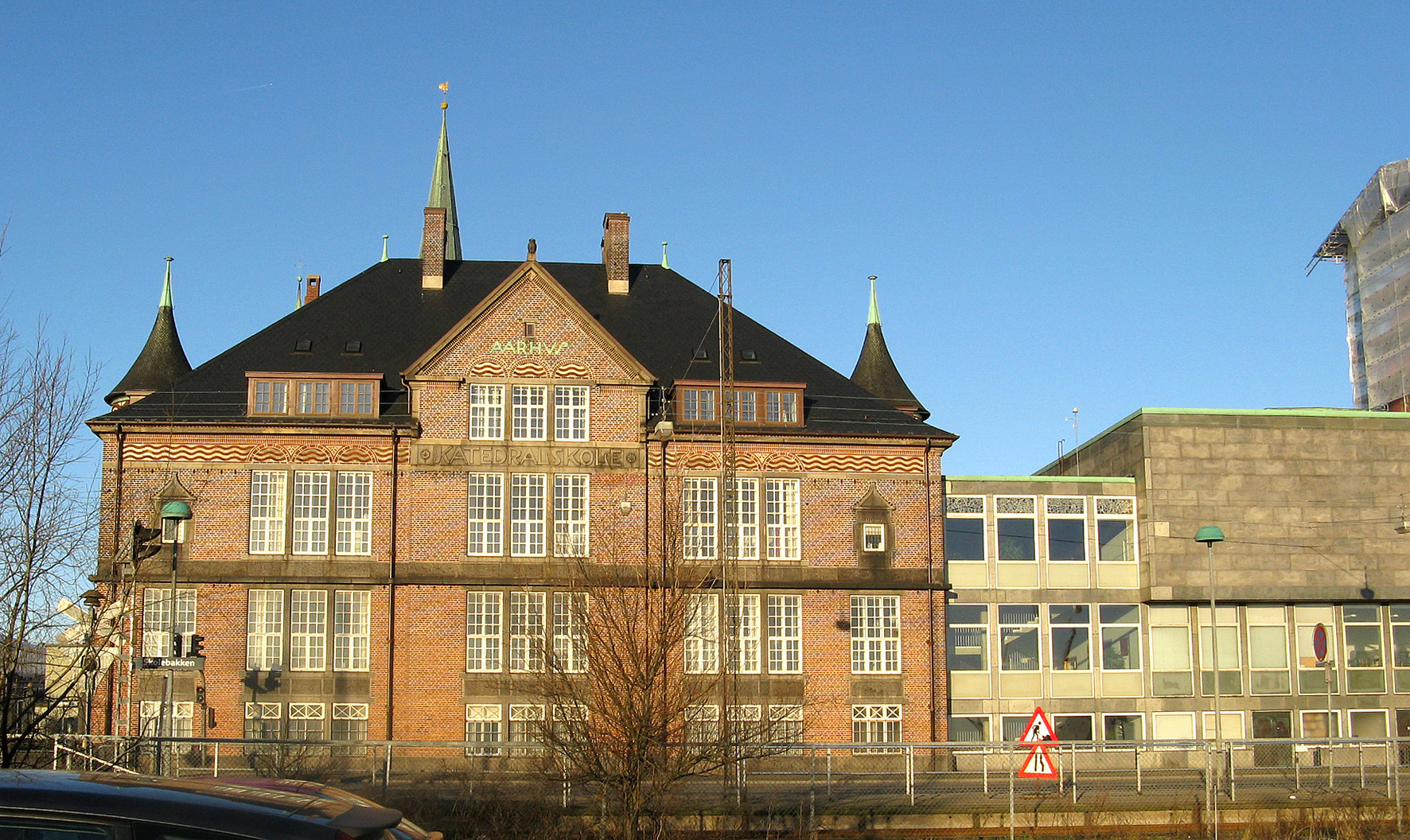
- Type: Secondary education
- Established: 1195
- Principal: Lone Eibye Mikkelsen (2015)
- Faculty: 100 (2015)
- Students: 824 (2015)
- Location: Aarhus, Denmark
- Website: Official website

Aarhus Katedralskole is a cathedral school, an institution of secondary education, a Danish Gymnasium and a listed building in Aarhus, Denmark. The school is situated in the neighborhood Midtbyen, in the Latin Quarter, bounded by the streets Mejlgade, Kystvejen and Skolegyde. Aarhus Katedralskole offers the 3 year Matriculation examination (STX) programme with elective subjects in the natural sciences, social sciences and arts. The school is an independent self-owning institution financed by the Danish state with about 900 students divided across 30 classes.

== History ==
Aarhus Katedralskole was founded in at least 1195 and has continuously worked as a school until present. The exact date of foundation is not known but on 9 February 1195, the bishop of Aarhus, Peder Vognsen, donated his books to the Aarhus Cathedral. The cathedral itself was first completed in 1300, but construction of it began around the same time. During the reformation the school was confiscated by the Crown and from 1 January 1986 ownership was transferred to Aarhus County. When the Danish counties were abolished in 2007, the school became independent and self-owning. Until Den videnskabelige Realskole in 1839-1853 and later Marselisborg School in 1898, Aarhus Katedralskole was the only place of higher learning in Aarhus. In 1996, the school buildings were, with a few exceptions, listed and protected by law.

The former cathedral student Morten Børup was rector of the school from 1491 to 1520, Ole Rømer graduated here in 1662, and Grundtvig was a student in 1798-1800.

=== Buildings ===
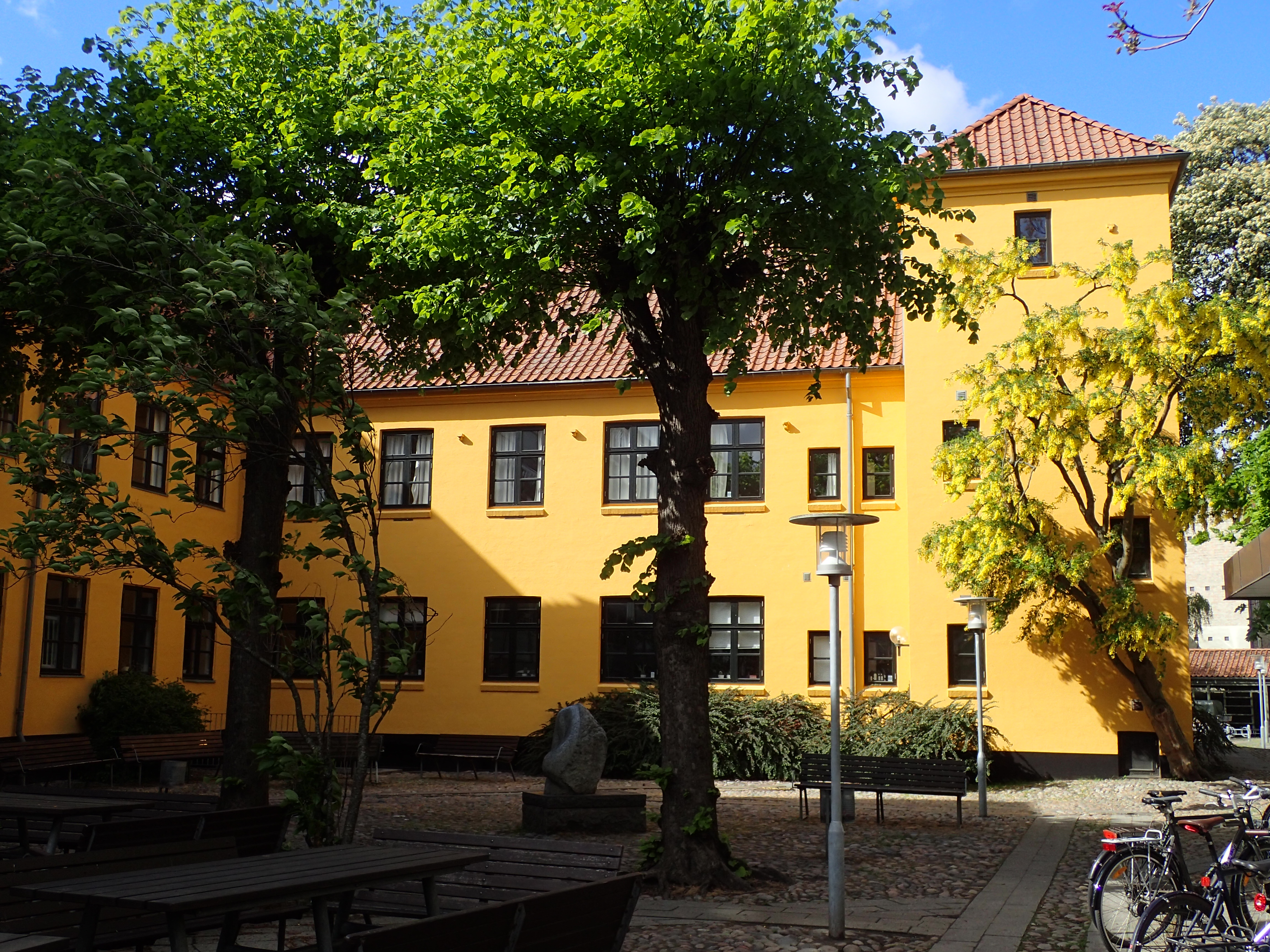
The yellow rector building from 1800. It was annexed by the school in 1957.

The first buildings, of which none remain, were completed in 1200 and since then multiple buildings have been added or changed through the centuries. Aarhus Katedralskole contains 4 listed buildings in total; the rector house in Mejlgade no. 6 from 1808 and three buildings colloquially referred to by their exterior colors. The rector building is Classicist with references to the style as it was used in Copenhagen. The white building from 1763 by Christian Jensen Mørup was originally designed in a classicist style but was later extensively remodeled in a Neoclassical appearance. The red building 1903-05 by Hack Kampmann is in the Art Nouveau style while the grey building from 1956 to 1957 by C.F. Møller is modernistic, minimalistic and functionalist and bears some similarity to the City Hall.

== Notable graduates ==
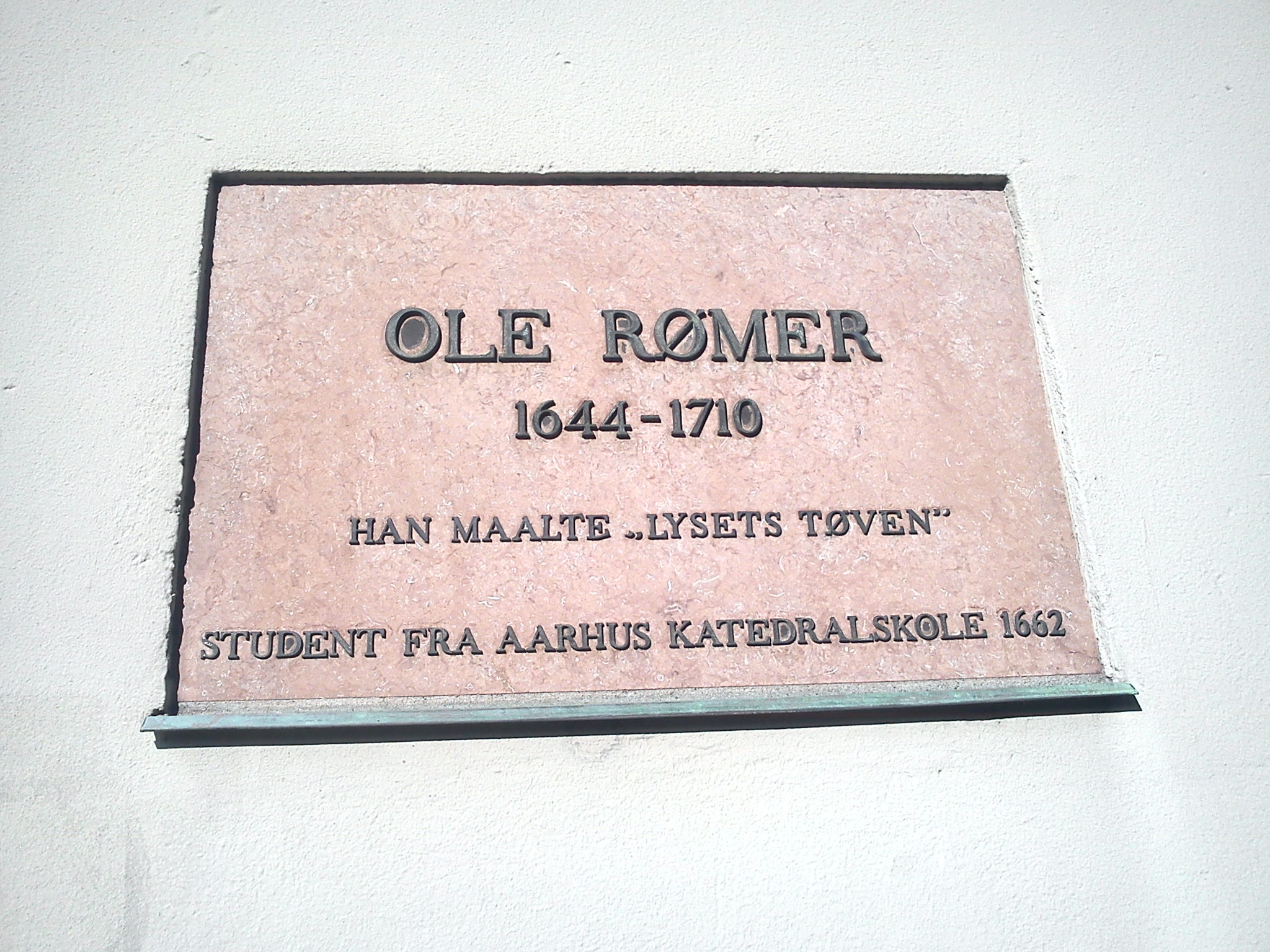
A relief in memory of Ole Rømer, graduate of 1662.

Notable graduates from former times includes:

- Morten Børup (1446–1526), educator and poet
- Ole Worm (1588-1654), physician and historian
- Ole Rømer (1644-1710), astronomer
- Grundtvig (1783-1872), cultural personality and writer
- Emmerik Høegh-Guldberg (1807-1881), graphical artist, teacher and principal
- Janus la Cour (1837-1909), painter
- H.O. Lange (1863-1943), egyptologist and librarian
- August Krogh (1874-1949), scientist (physiology and medicine)

And from present times:

- Marie Bach Hansen, actress
- Thorkild Bjørnvig, writer
- Nils Malmros, filmmaker and surgeon
- Lene Kaaberbøl, writer
- Ole Lund Kirkegaard, writer and teacher
- Peter Laugesen, playwright and poet
- Ulf Pilgaard, actor

== See also ==
- Listed buildings in Aarhus Municipality
