= Juul's House =

House in Aarhus, Denmark built in 1629

Coordinates: 56.1582°N 10.2119°E

- Juuls Gård
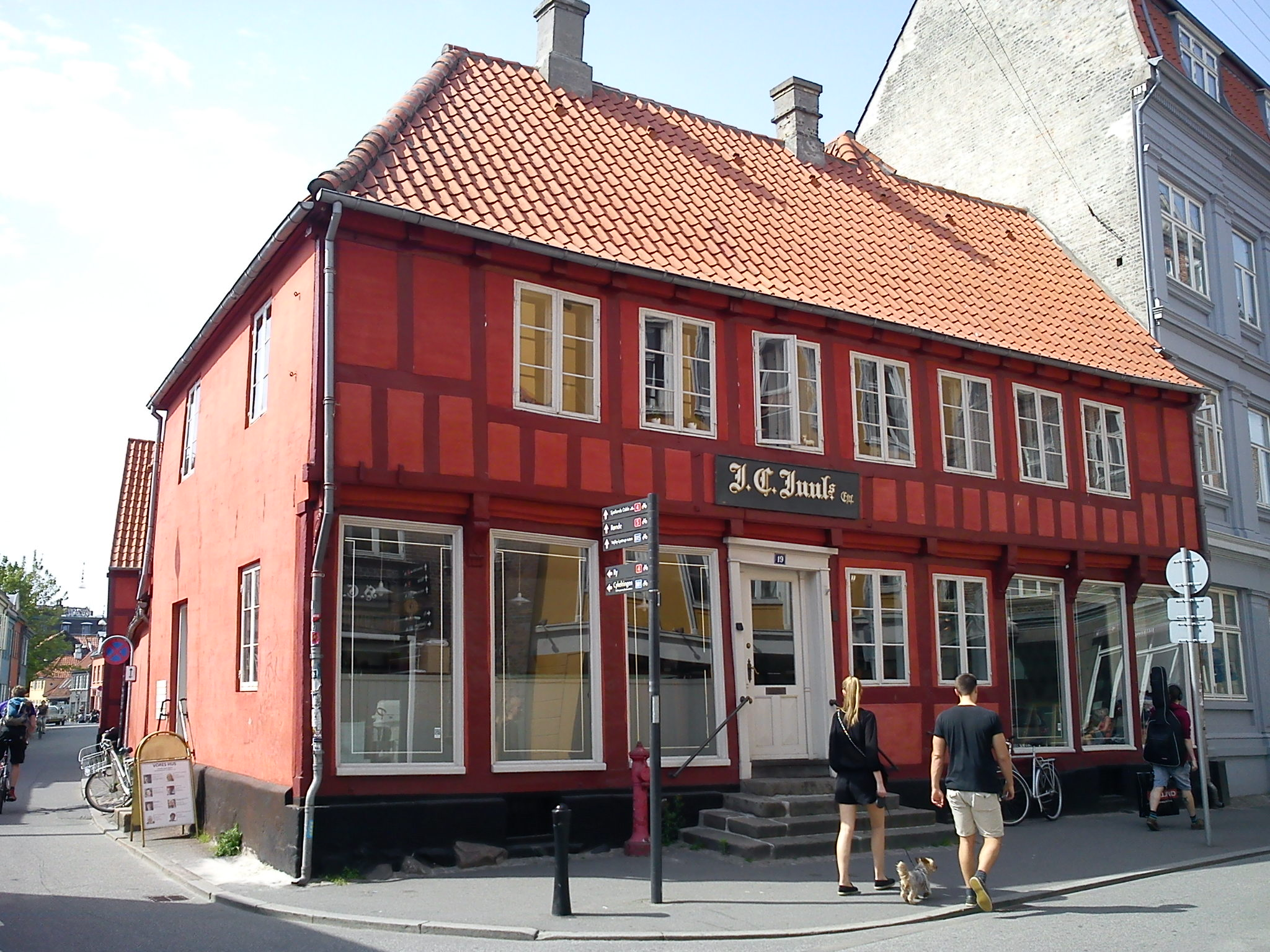
- Interactive map of the Juul's House area

General information
- Architectural style: Renaissance
- Location: Aarhus, Denmark
- Completed: 1629

Technical details
- Floor count: 2

Juul's House is a house and a listed building in Aarhus, Denmark. The house was built in 1629 and was listed on the national Danish registry of protected buildings and places by the Danish Heritage Agency on 1 April 1984. The building is one of the oldest in the city and it is situated in the historical Latin Quarter on Mejlgade. It has been a paint shop since 1842 and it is the oldest paint shop in the country.

== History ==
The building was previously two houses from the years around 1600 that were joined together around 1629. It is situated on Mejlgade, a street close to the harbor and at the time home to the wealthiest merchants in the city. It functioned as a store and home for the first 200 years of its existence, but not many specifics are known.

In 1830 the Jewish merchant Abraham Lewis bought the house and opened a store but in 1837 he went bankrupt. Lewis could not pay his debts and wound up in debtors prison and disappeared from public records. In 1842 I.C. Juul bought the house and opened a new store selling, among other things, paint. The first years Juul sold a variety of items: herring from Trondheim, cigars, lemons, leather, and aged cognac. Eventually the focus shifted to paint which was imported and then mixed in the store. In 1892 Juul had his 50th anniversary which was celebrated in Mejlgade and adjacent streets.

The house has functioned as a paint shop to this day and still bears the Juul name. The long history of the house can be witnessed by entering the store. There's a paint bucket signed by most employees since 1880 and paint samples from a century.

== Architecture ==
Juul's House in Mejlgade no. 19 is a well-preserved example of an old half-timbered Renaissance house. The house has four wings in a square with an internal courtyard, constructed at different periods. The storefront facing Mejlgade is two former houses joined into one around 1629. The wing along the neighboring house in no. 23 was constructed some time around 1600 but the main building is a few decades younger. In the late 1700s the back building was added and in 1851 the low, narrow wing along Graven was added, creating a four-winged estate with an internal courtyard.

The front building is constructed over a foundation of tarred boulders and granite. Between the floors there are storey projections with carved beams. The slightly crooked street has made room for a short staircase of granite ashlar at the front entrance. The facade facing the street Graven was rebuilt in brick in 1864 and contains two gates. The back house to the west is half-timbered, and the long side wing is half-timbered as well.
