= Midtbyen, Aarhus =

Midtbyen
- Neighborhood
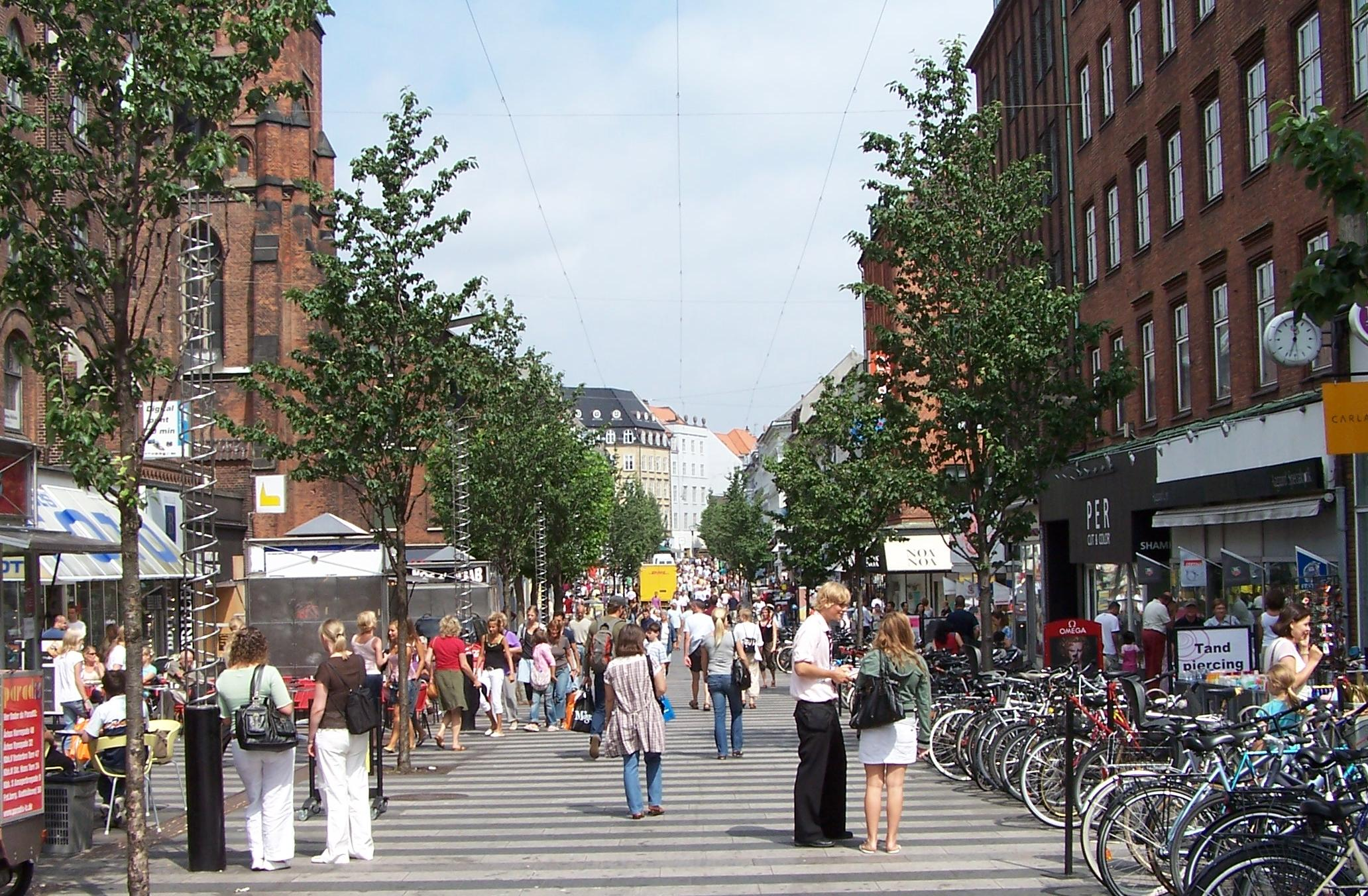
- Ryesgade in Midtbyen

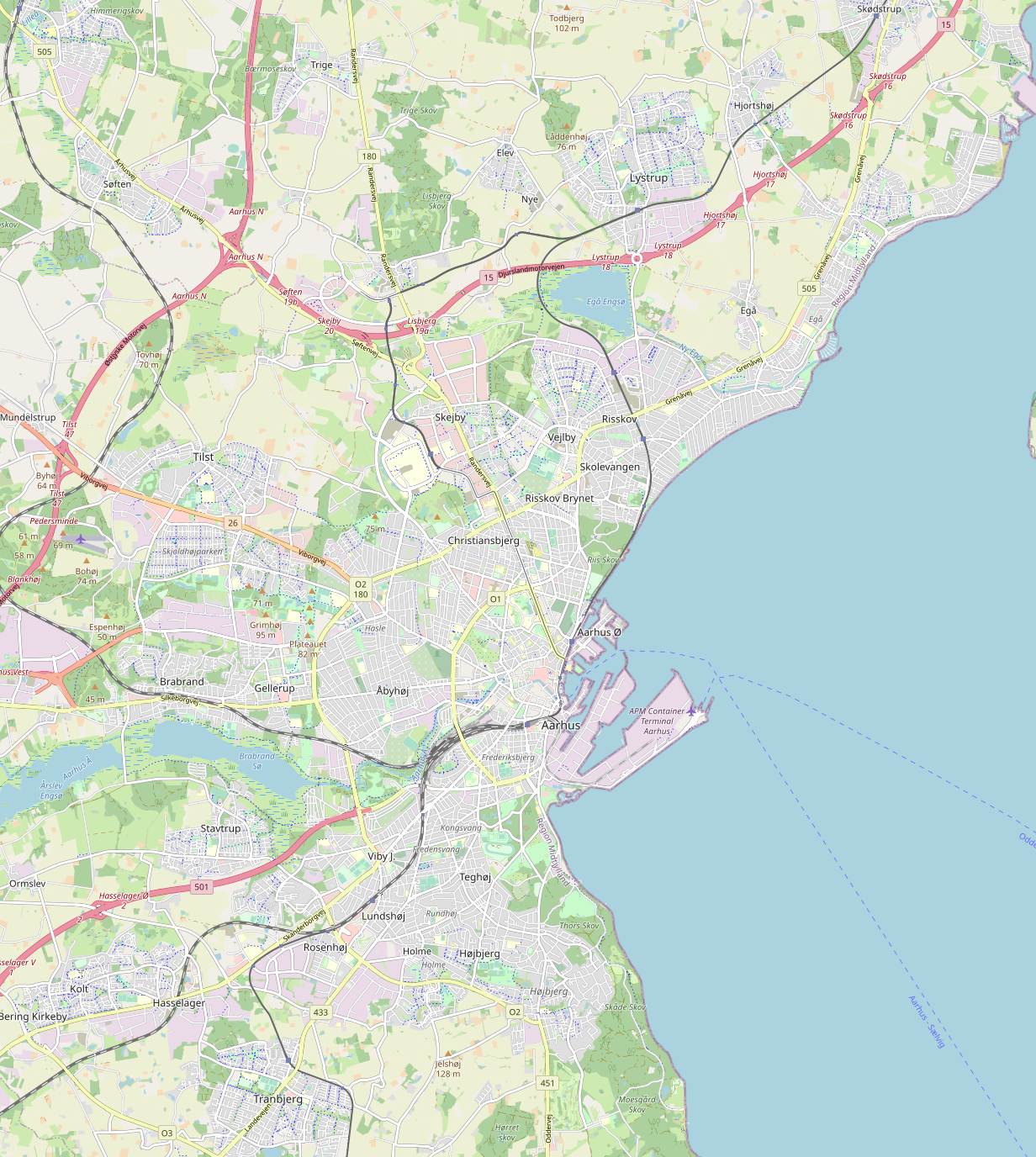
- Location within Aarhus
- Coordinates: 56.147°N 10.212°E
- Country: Kingdom of Denmark
- Regions of Denmark: Central Denmark Region
- Municipality: Aarhus Municipality
- District: Aarhus C
- Postal code]: 8000

Midtbyen (lit. "The Mid-town"), also known as Aarhus Center or City, is the inner part of Aarhus. Midtbyen is part of district Aarhus C, mainly with postal code 8000, together with Vesterbro, Nørre Stenbro Trøjborg and Frederiksbjerg and has a population of around 90000.

Midtbyen is characterized by narrow, winding, cobbled streets and a busy street life, with many small squares, cafés and shops. Parts of the old town center has been saved and protected from destructive modern development and can be experienced in the neighbourhood of Latinerkvarteret, but old individual listed houses are scattered all across Midtbyen. A large part of the area is carfree and the neighborhood has been increasingly pedestrianised. The square of Store Torv (lit.: large square) in front of the cathedral, forms a natural centre of the large pedestrian zone.

The stream of Aarhus Å flows through Midtbyen and adds to the areas' distinct charm. The waterway was covered by roads for many decades, but has recently been opened up again.

== History ==
Midtbyen comprise the oldest part of the city of Aarhus and was where the town itself originated more than a thousand years ago. Midtbyen dates back to at least late 700 AD, at the beginning of the Viking Age and was originally and previously confined by fortifications and walls. Nowadays the defensive walls are long gone, but survive in placenames such as Nørreport (English: Northern Gate) and a number of streets named after their location relative to the old town center, such as Søndergade, Nørregade and Vestergade meaning southern street, northern street and western street respectively. A similar naming structure can be observed in many older Danish towns and cities. The canal of the Aarhus River runs through Midtbyen, along the street of Åboulevarden and was important to the development of the early settlements, that sprawled around it.

== Infrastructure ==
The streets in Midtbyen are mostly narrow and laid out in a somewhat chaotic pattern. Many are closed to motorized traffic, instead serving as pedestrian zones with a lively street life and shopping opportunities. Outside of these areas, a lot of the roads are one way directed and it can be difficult to navigate or find a free parking spot, if you do not know the area well. Midtbyen has some heavy traffic during rush hours and it can also be a problem. To guide the traffic and take of the pressure, the inner city of Aarhus is surrounded by a number of ring roads. In Midtbyen, the streets of Nørre Allé (Northern Avenue), Vester Allé (Western Avenue) and Sønder Allé (Southern Avenue), works as a ring road, following the former city walls of medieval times and guiding the traffic around the narrow and most difficult streets of the inner centre. There are several large car parks in or just outside the city centre, including Magasin du Nord, Dokk1, Salling, Brunn's Galleri, Scandinavian Center and Storcenter Nord. Most of the yellow city buses in Aarhus pass through Midtbyen, while the blue regional and Inter-city buses terminate at the Aarhus Bus Terminal close to the Central Station. The street of Park Allé (Park Avenue) next to the City Hall, serves as a major bus hub. Even though the traffic situation can be difficult for motorized vehicles, it is fairly easy and safe to walk or bike around Midtbyen. Major roads has bike paths next to them and some streets are dedicated bike roads. It is not allowed to bike in the pedestrianised zones.

== Gallery ==
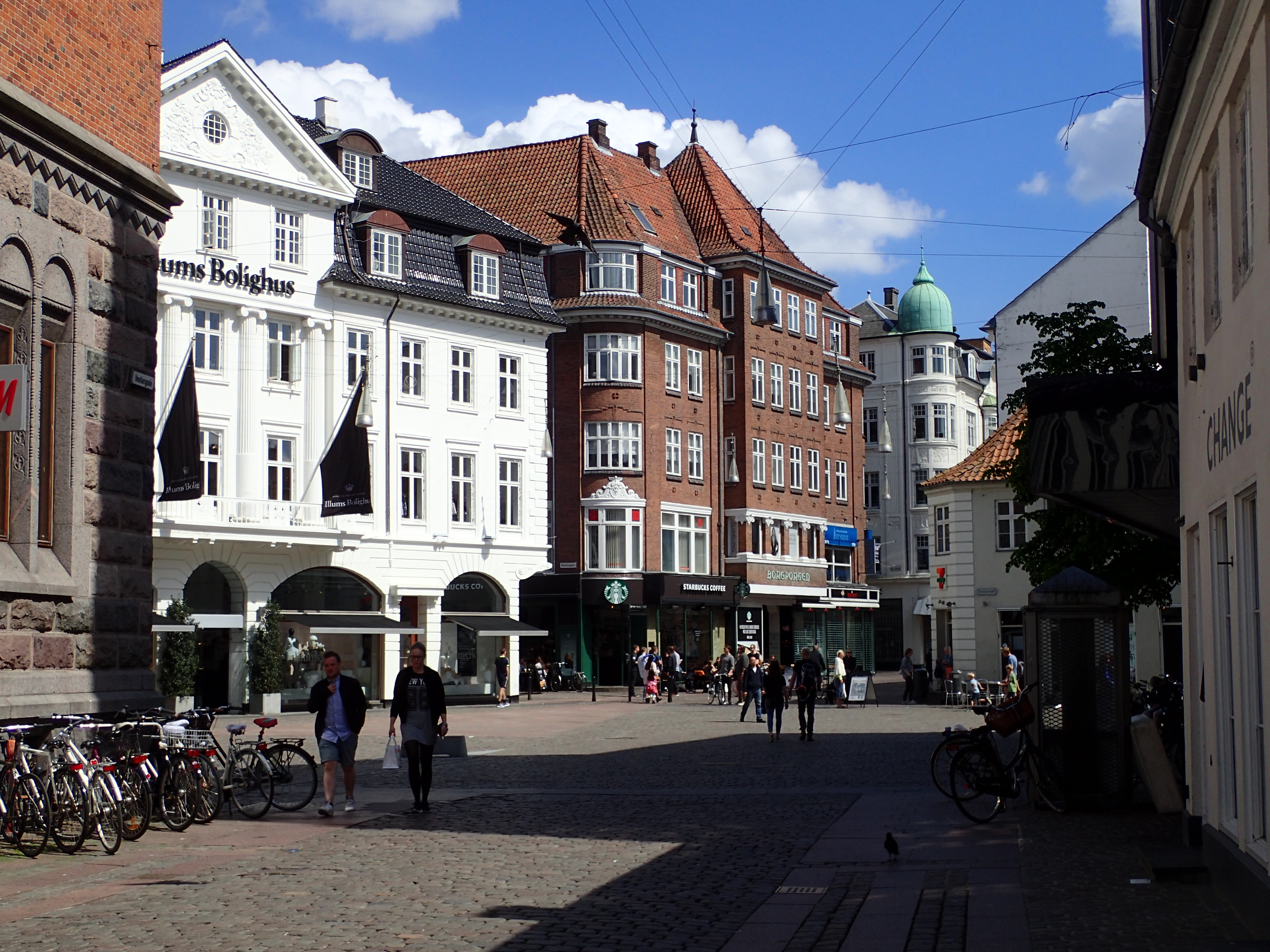
Lille Torv, one of many cobblestone squares

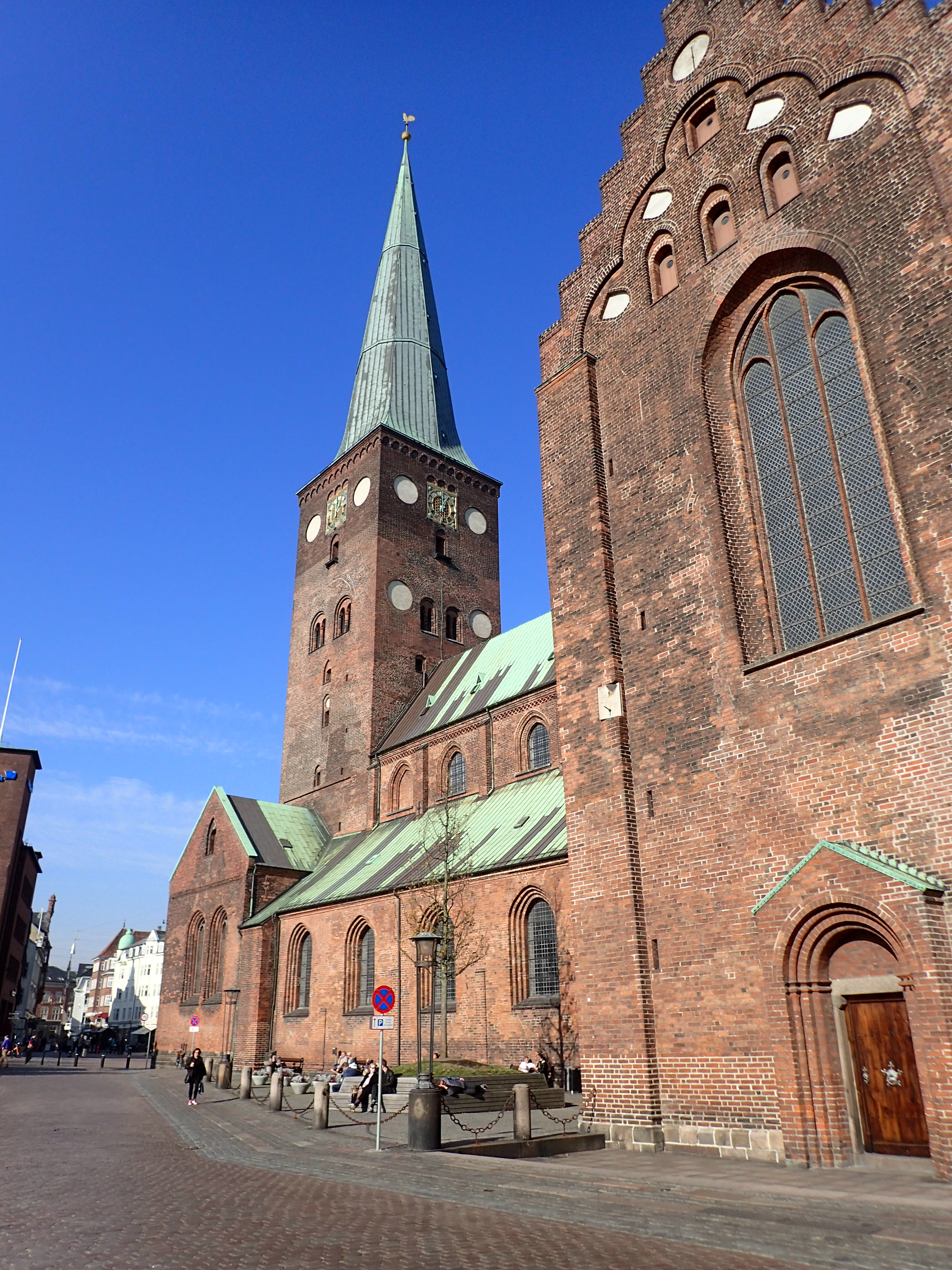
Aarhus Cathedral

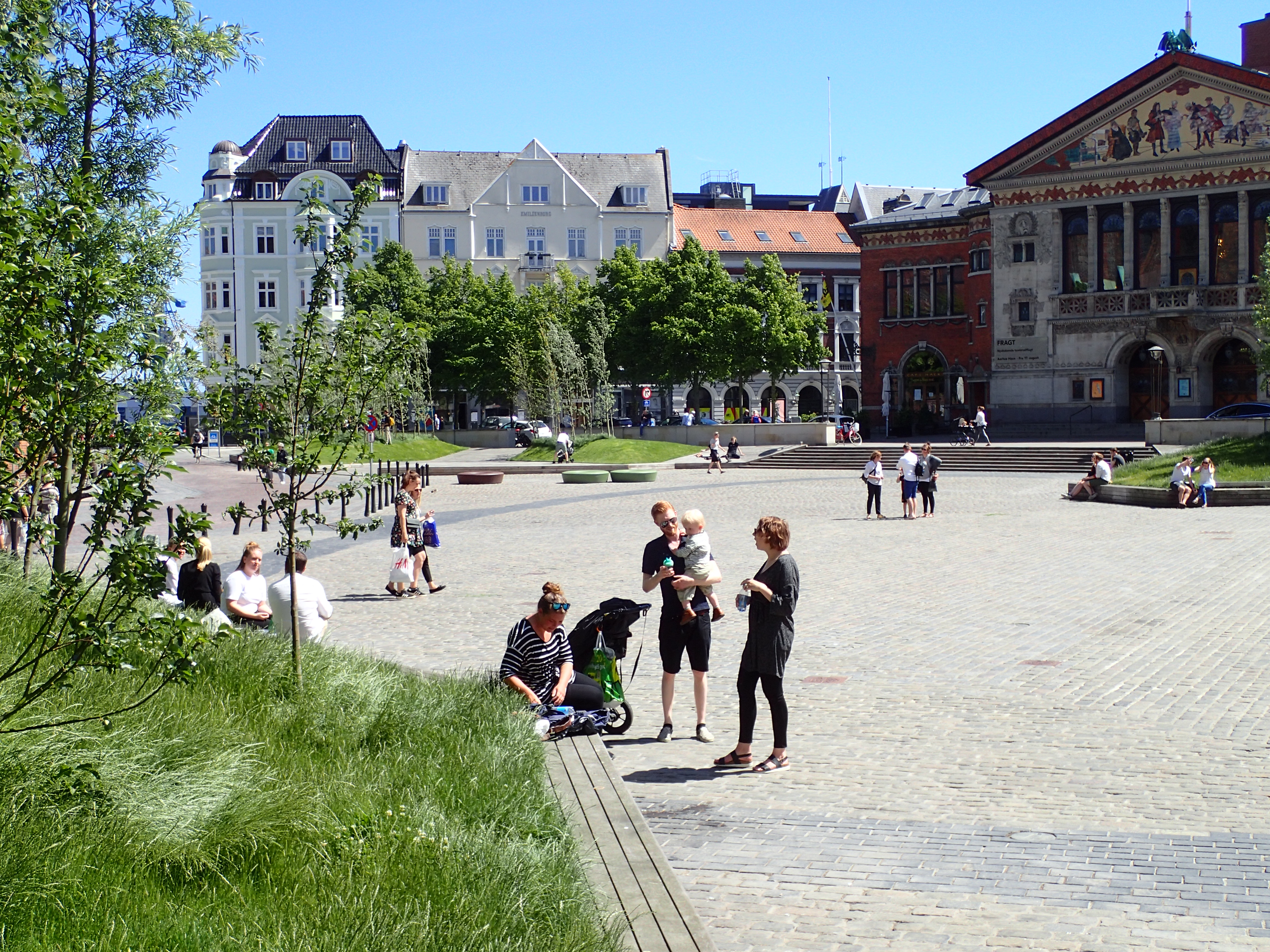
Aarhus theatre at the central square of Bispetorvet.

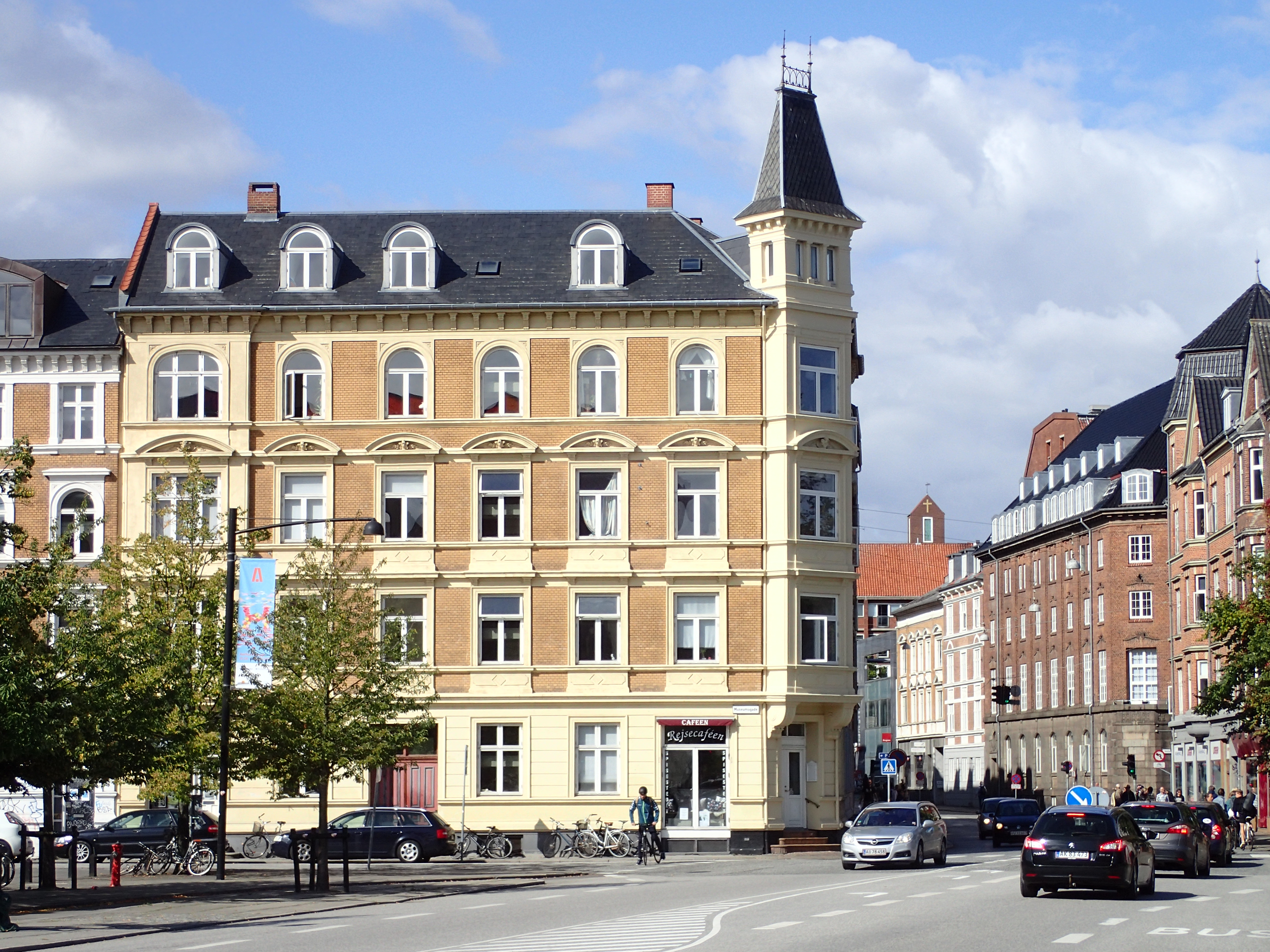
Historicist architecture

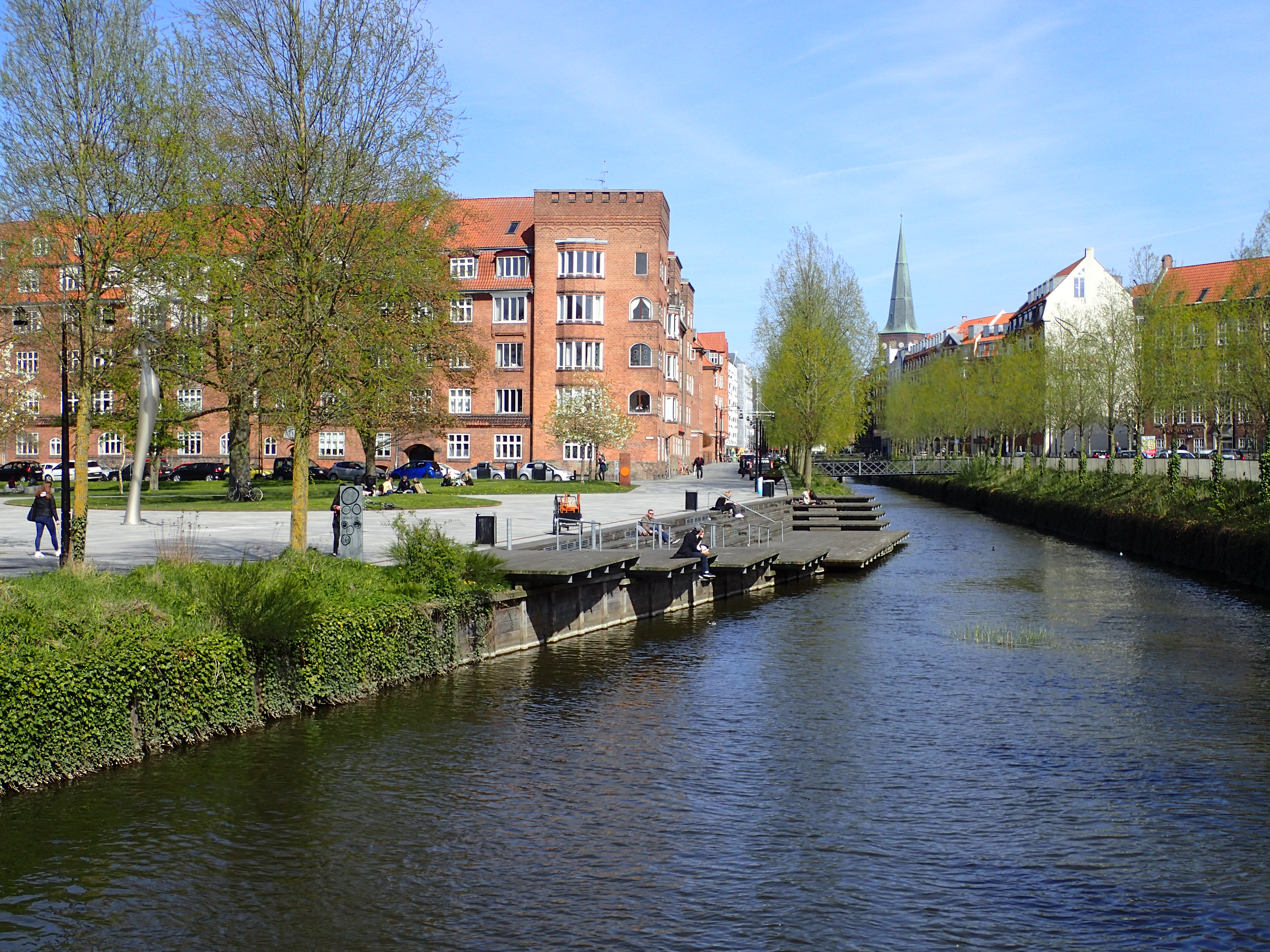
The Aarhus Canal. It was vital to the city's early development.

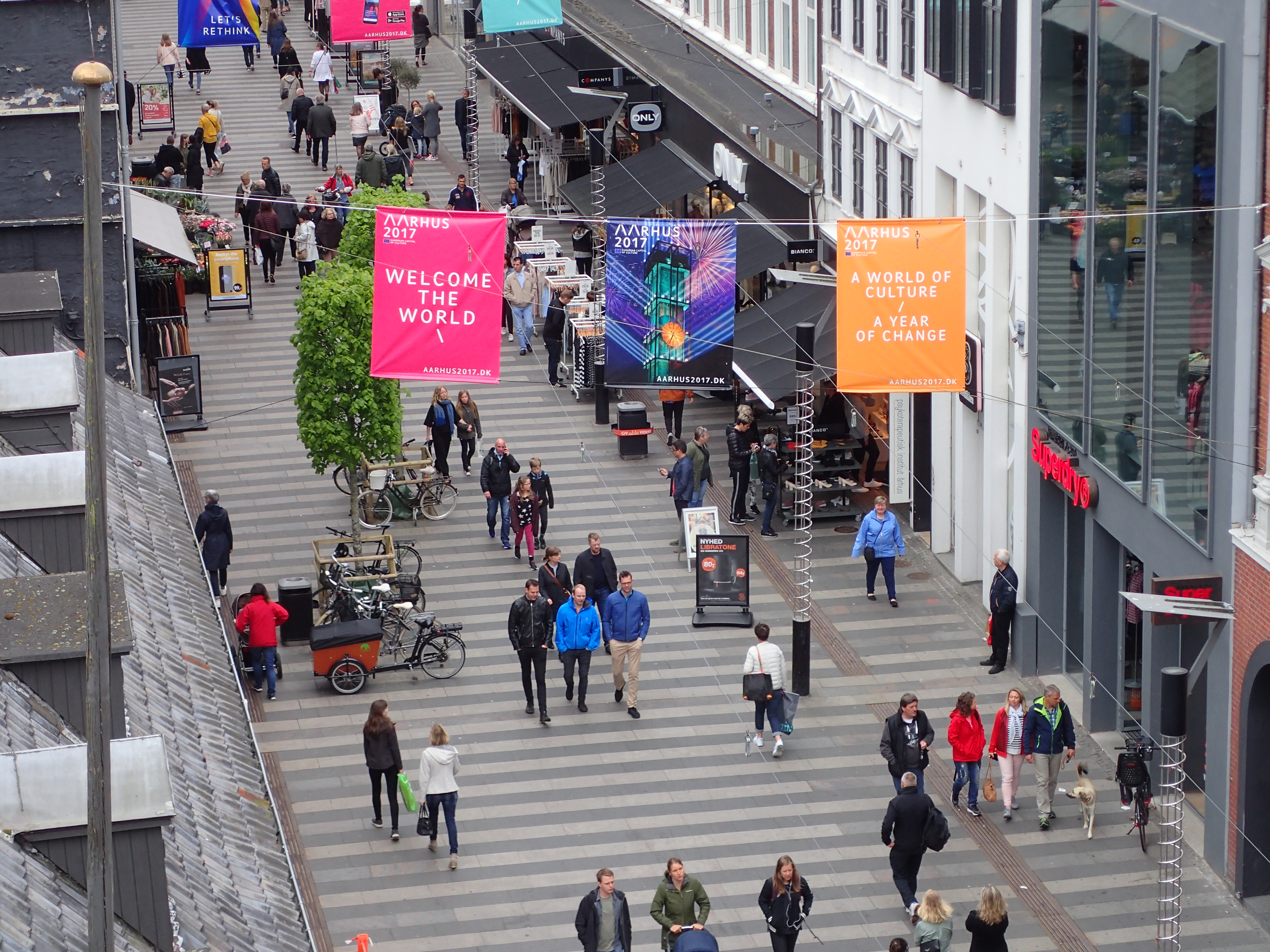
Strøget, central pedestrianized shopping street

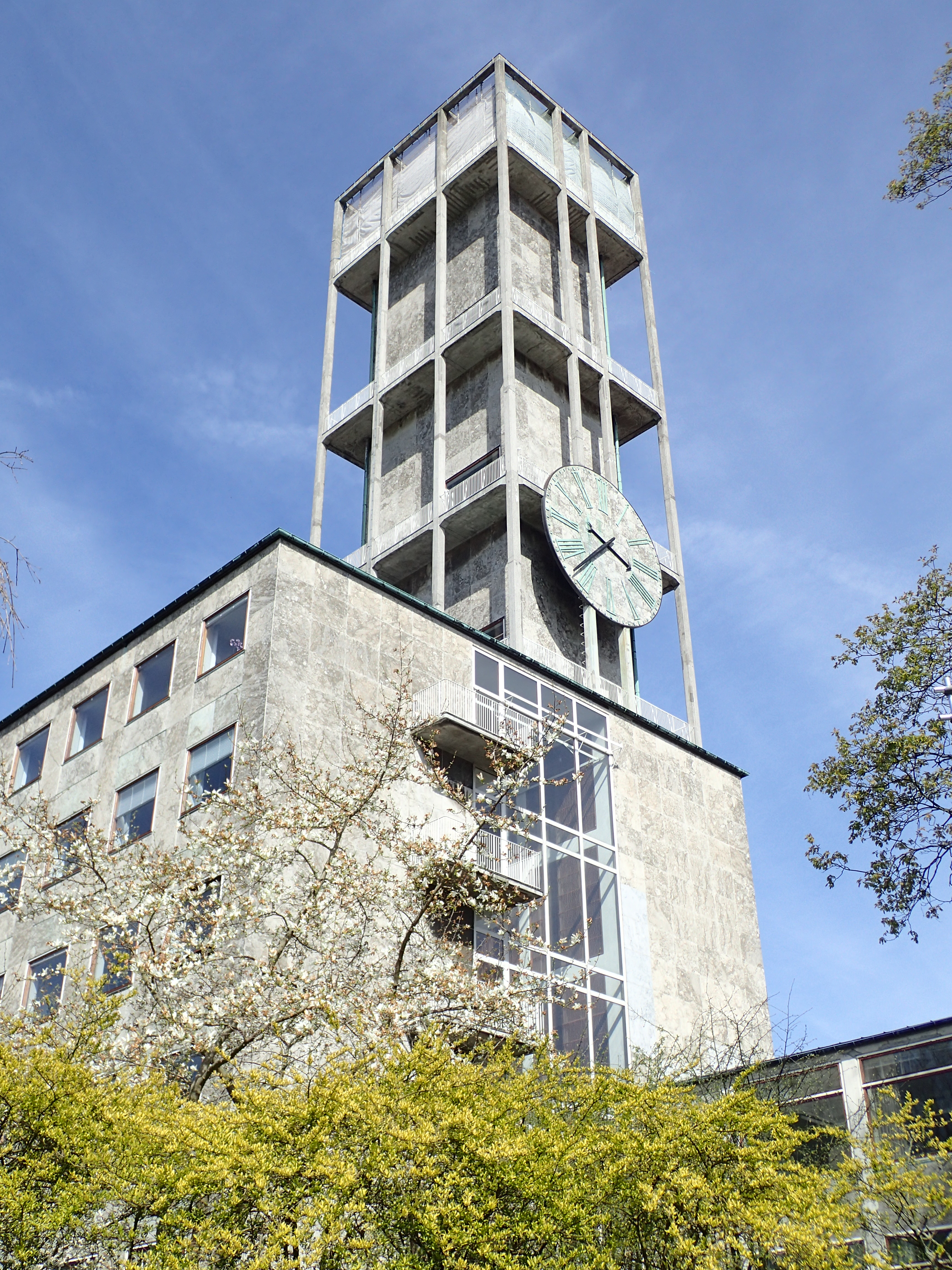
Aarhus City Hall

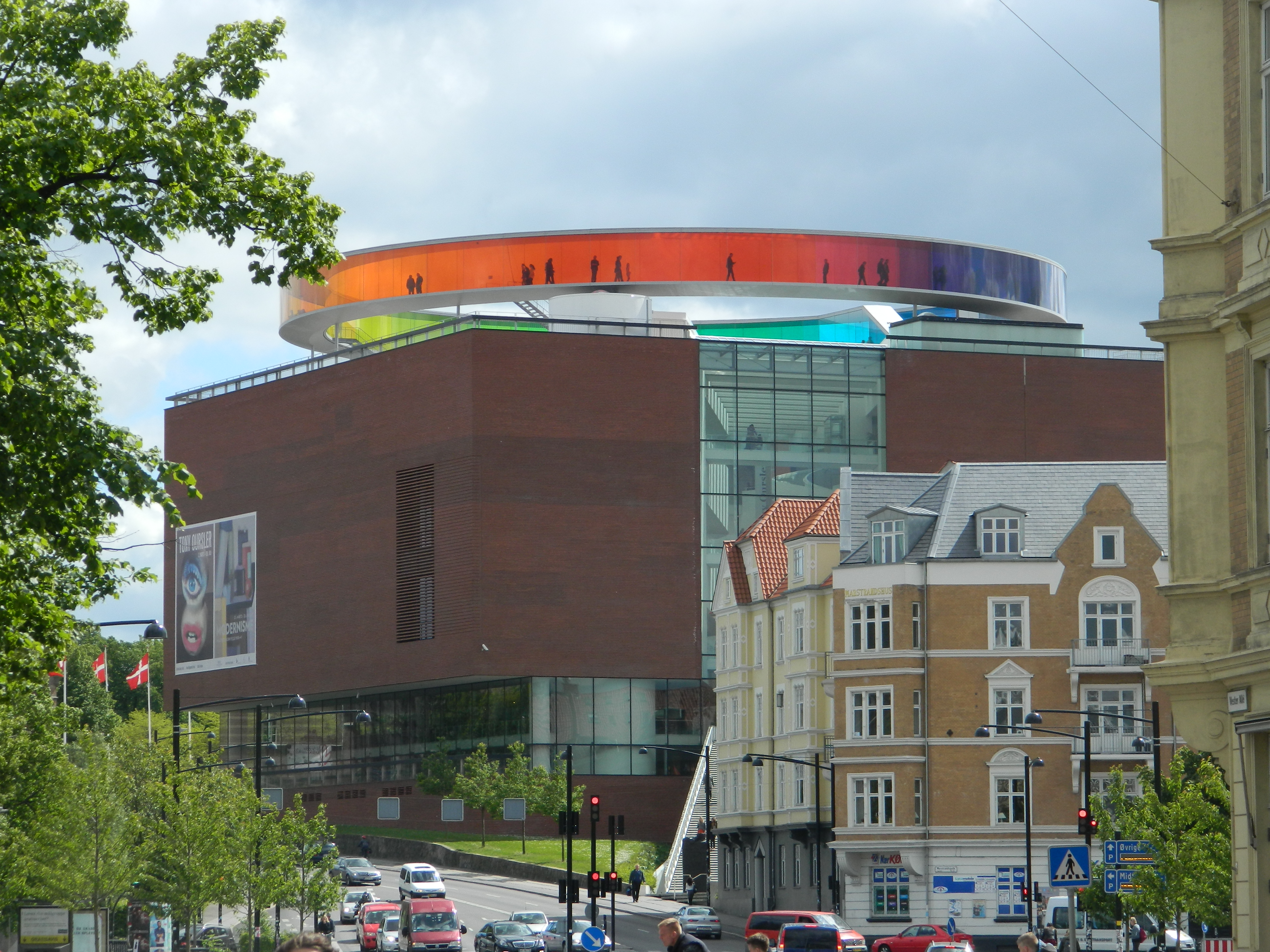
ARoS art museum

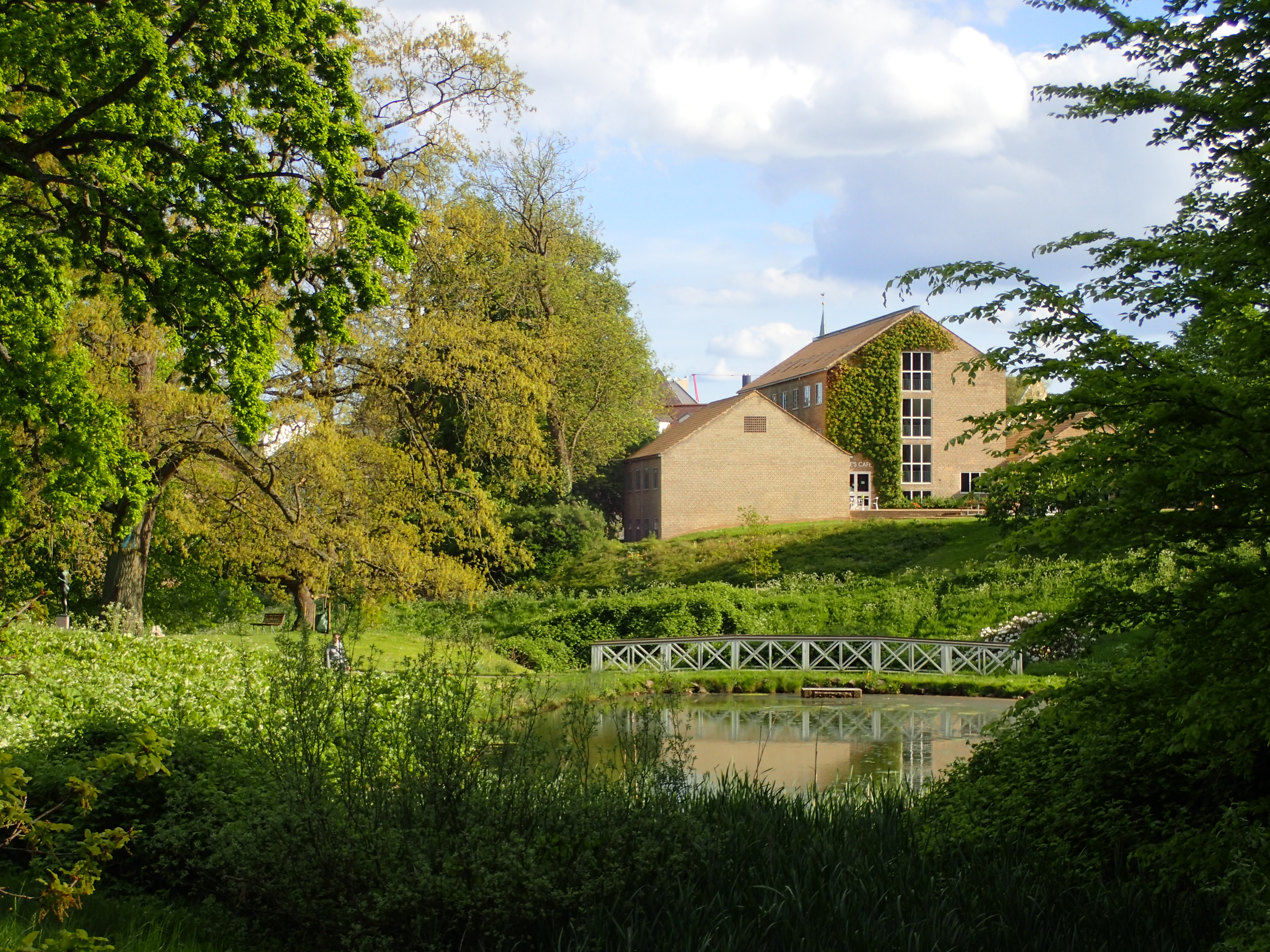
University Park

== See also ==
- Århus Domkirke, the tallest and longest cathedral in Denmark
- Church of Our Lady (Aarhus)
- Århus City Hall
- ARoS Aarhus Kunstmuseum, the main Århus arts museum
- Aarhus Kunstbygning, an arts center
- Aarhus Theatre
- Kvindemuseet, the Women's Museum
- Viking Museum (Aarhus)
- Århus Central Station
- Latinerkvarteret

== Sources ==
- Magistratens 2. Afdeling (1984): Den Indre By - Århus Kommuneatlas, Aarhus Municipality. (in Danish)
