= Mejlgade =

Street in Aarhus, Denmark

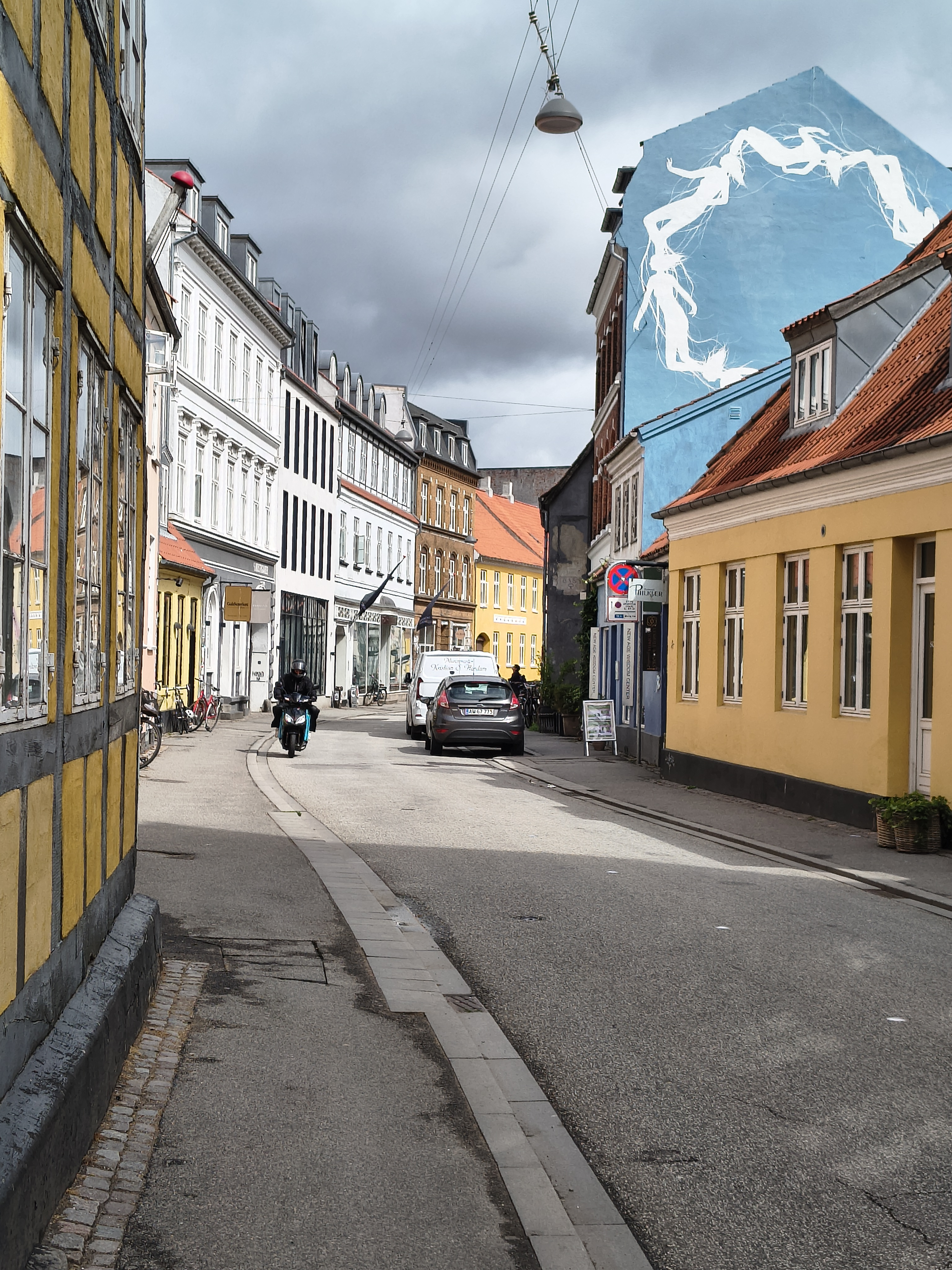
- Mejlgade in Aarhus
- Interactive map of Mejlgade
- Former names: Medelgade (1400s); Middelgade (1700s)
- Length: 689 m (2,260 ft)
- Location: Latin Quarter, Aarhus, Denmark
- Postal code: 8000
- Coordinates: 56°09′36.0″N 10°12′46.7″E

Mejlgade is a street in Aarhus which runs north to south from Østbanetorvet to Skolegade and intersects Nørrebrogade. The street is situated in the historic Latin Quarter neighborhood and has the highest number of historic and listed buildings in the city. Mejlgade is one-way and no-parking zone for cars for most of its length and pedestrians and cyclists are given priority. The single lane is tiled and a part of the Cykelringen bicycle ring which circumnavigates the city center. Mejlgade has a high number of small specialty shops and some cafés and bars.

== History ==
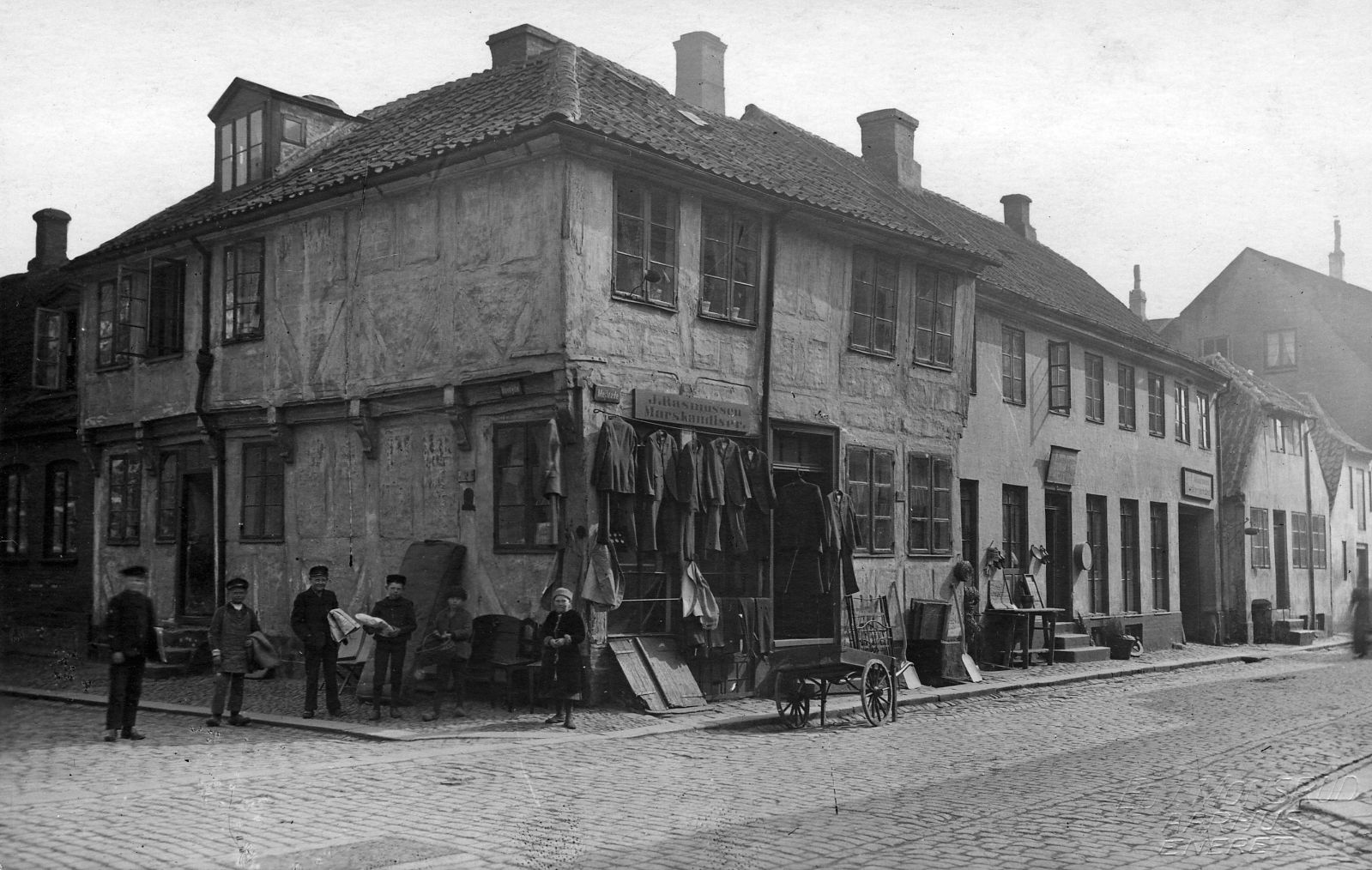
Corner of Mejlgade and Havgyden, 1904

Mejlgade is first mentioned in the 1400s as "Medelgade" from the word ”mæthal”, meaning "middel" (English: Middle). In the 1700s it is catalogued as "Middelgade" and by the late 1800s it is known as the present Mejlgade.

Mejlgade stems from the earliest history of the city in the early Viking Age. It was established within the initial ramparts of the Viking settlement and later the city walls around the medieval town. In the early to mid-1800s it was the primary arterial and busiest trade street in the town and between 1828 and 1851 the north end of the street had one of 7 city gates where access taxes were collected on produce entering the town. Many merchants houses were built in Mejlgade, close to the city gate, typically with multiple wings and a courtyard for stables and storage.

In 1851 the access taxes were abolished and the city walls and gates torn down. Houses on the east side of the street initially had backyards leading to the waters edge on the coast until 1871 when Kystvejen was established, separating the houses from the coast. The street was cobbled through the 1800s but in 1900 it was paved with asphalt as the first street in the city.

== Structures ==
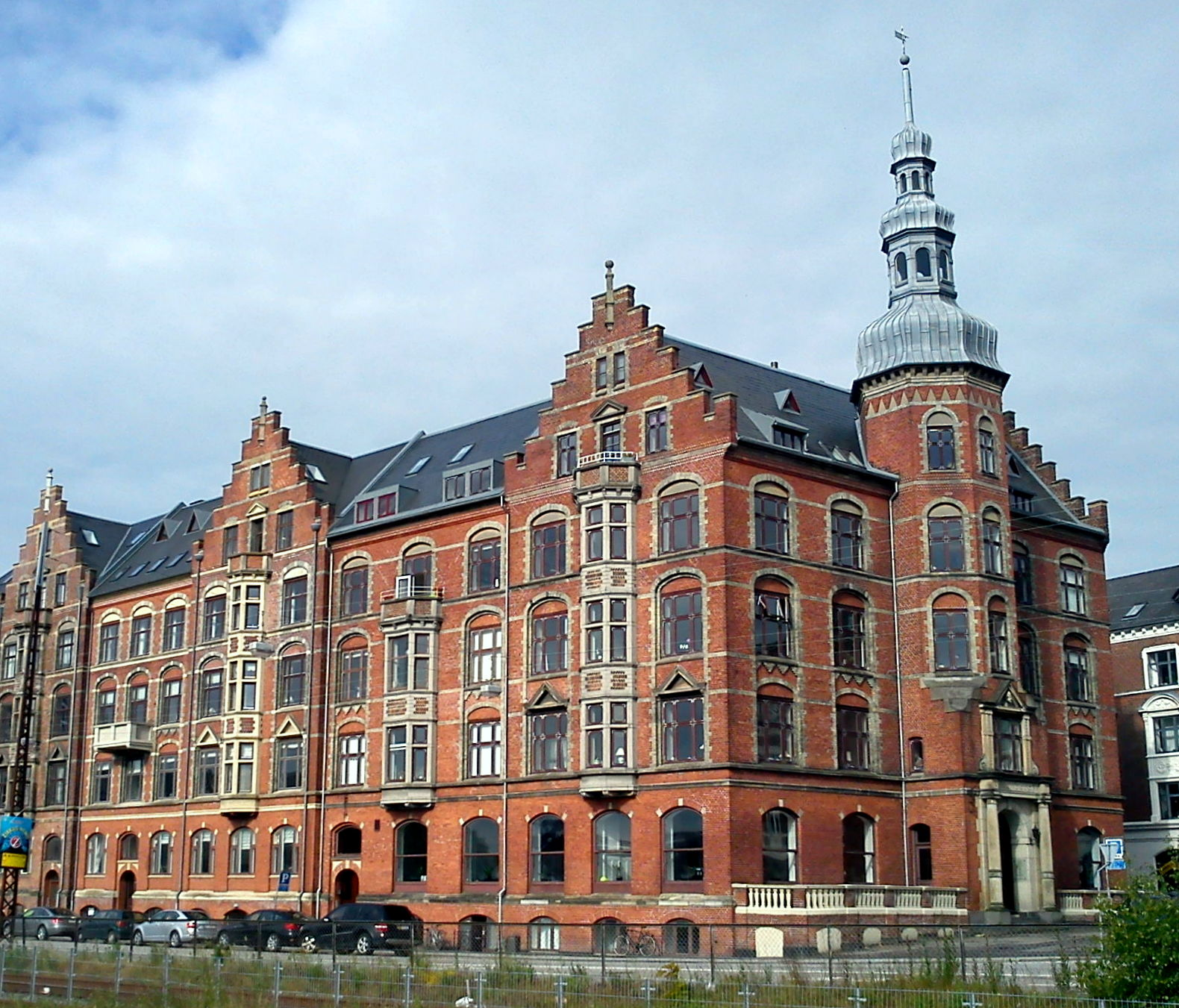
The Mejlborg building at the northern end of Mejlgade.

Mejlgade contains 9 buildings listed in the Danish registry of protected buildings and places and many architectural styles from different periods are represented throughout the street. The Jutland Art Academy (Danish: Det Jydske Kunstakademi) has been situated in the historicist building from 1803 in no. 32 since 1964. Mejlgade no. 6 was previously known as the mayors house. The first mayor to live there was Ulrik Christian von Schmidten, mayor from 1866 to 1885, and it was used by his successors until 1919 when electoral reform made the office an elected position.

The stately Mejlborg building is situated on the site of the former city gate at the north end of the street. It was designed by Sophus Frederik Kühnel in 1896–98 for luxury condominiums with a commanding view of the Bay of Aarhus. In the 1899 fire Mejlborg burned down but was rebuilt the same year almost identically.

=== Listed buildings ===
The Cathedral School from 1195 lies on a parcel of land bordering Mejlgade, Skolegyde and Kystvejen and contains a number of buildings of which 4 are listed. One is the building facing Mejlgade, the classicist and baroque "white building" from 1766 by architect Christian Jensen Mørup. The building was renovated and extended in neoclassical style in 1849 by Jørgen Hansen Koch.

Mejlgade no. 7 from 1848 was built by Hans Wilhelm Schrøder in late classicist style. No. 19 is Juul's House, a half-timbered 4-winged structure from 1629 in renaissance style. Juul's House has been a paint shop since 1842 and is the oldest paint shop in the country. Mejlgade 25 is a half-timbered building from 1585. The 4 historicist buildings are the late-classicist houses in no. 43 from 1831 and no. 45 from 1864 in Empire style, no. 48 from 1864 and the classicist no. 52-54 from 1837. Mejlgade No. 48 was home to Århus Stiftstidende and its printing press, in differing buildings, from 1794 until 1906 when it was turned into an elementary school.

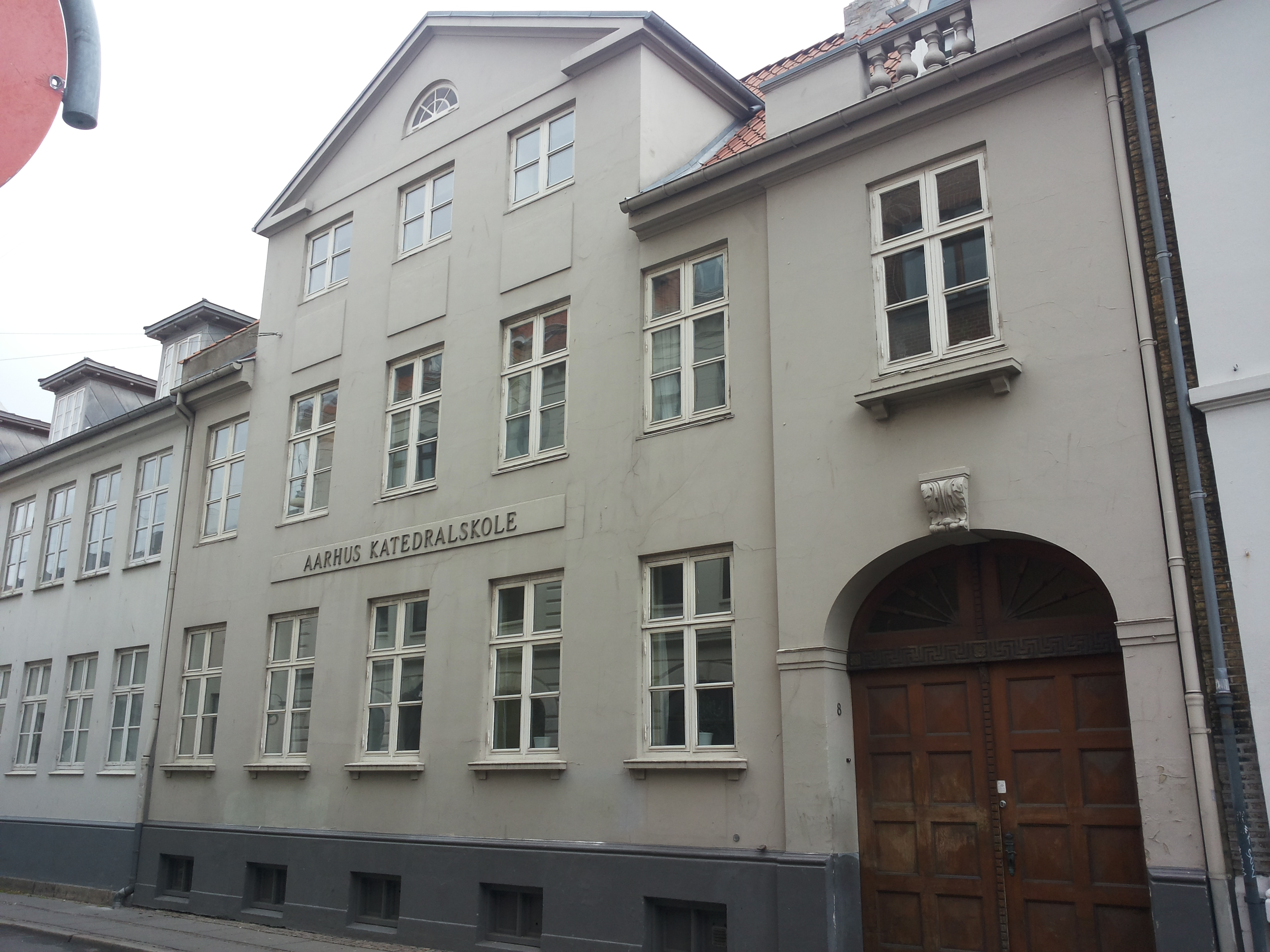
Aarhus Cathedral School from 1766

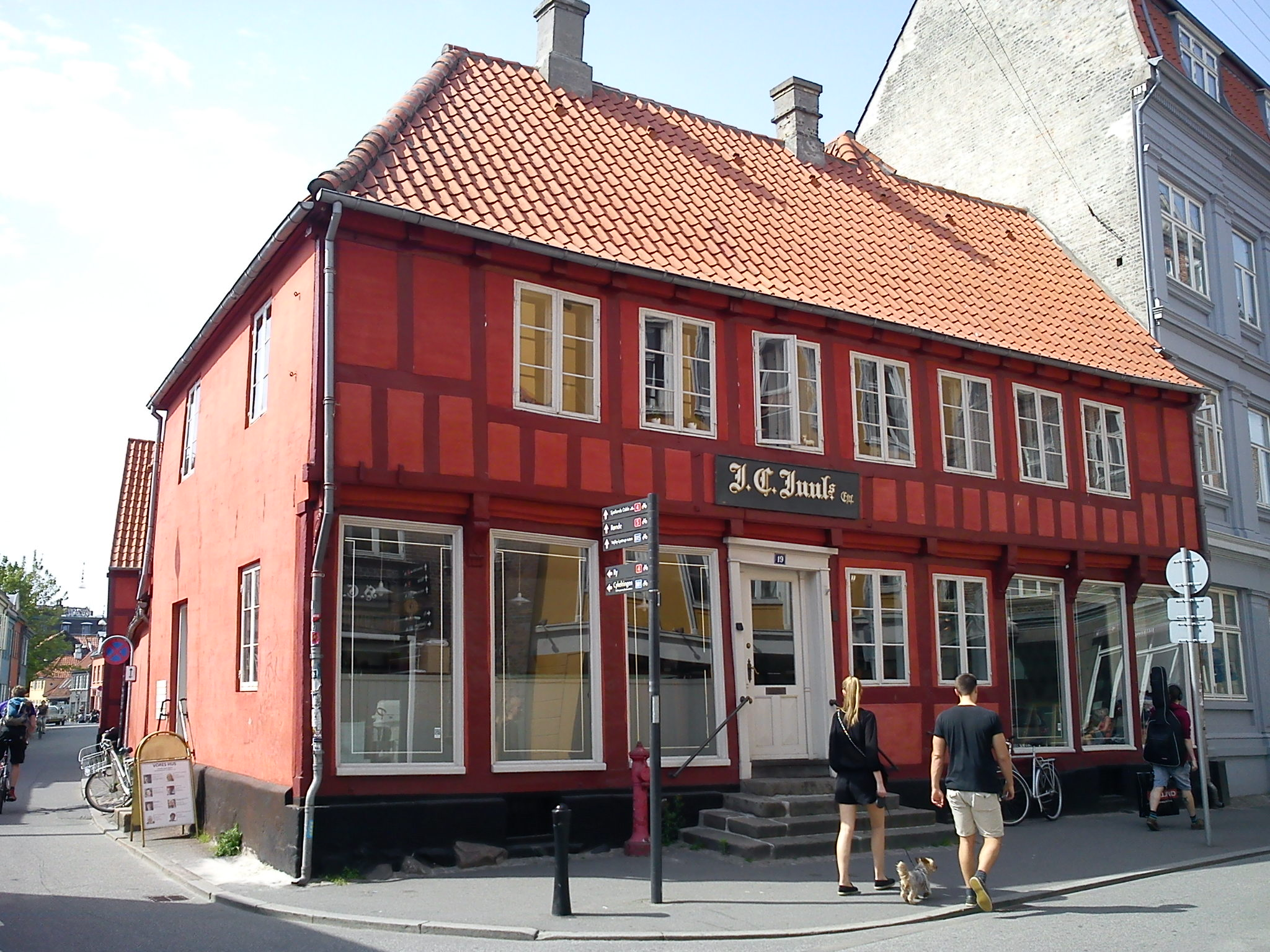
Juul's House 1629

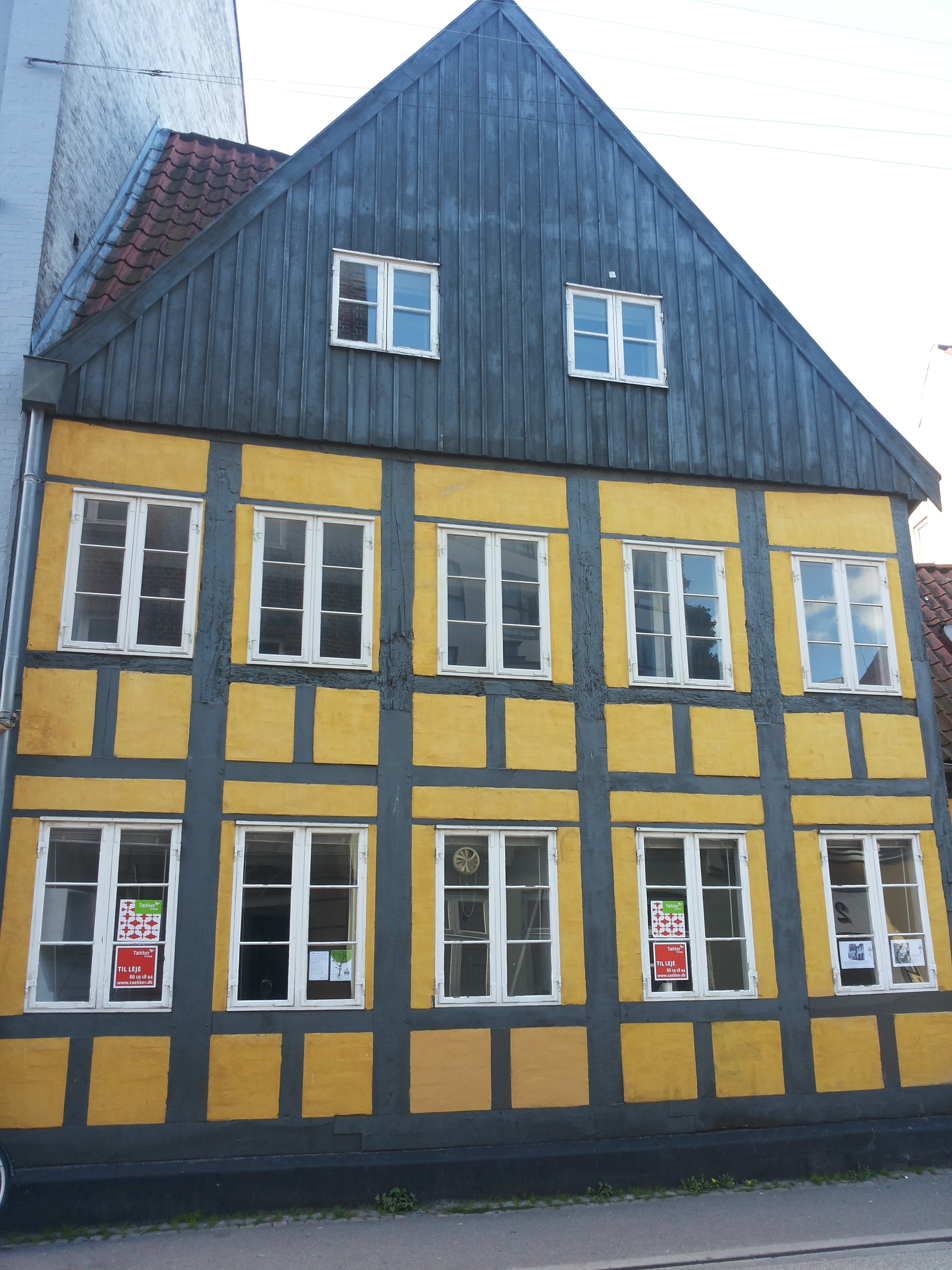
Mejlgade 25.

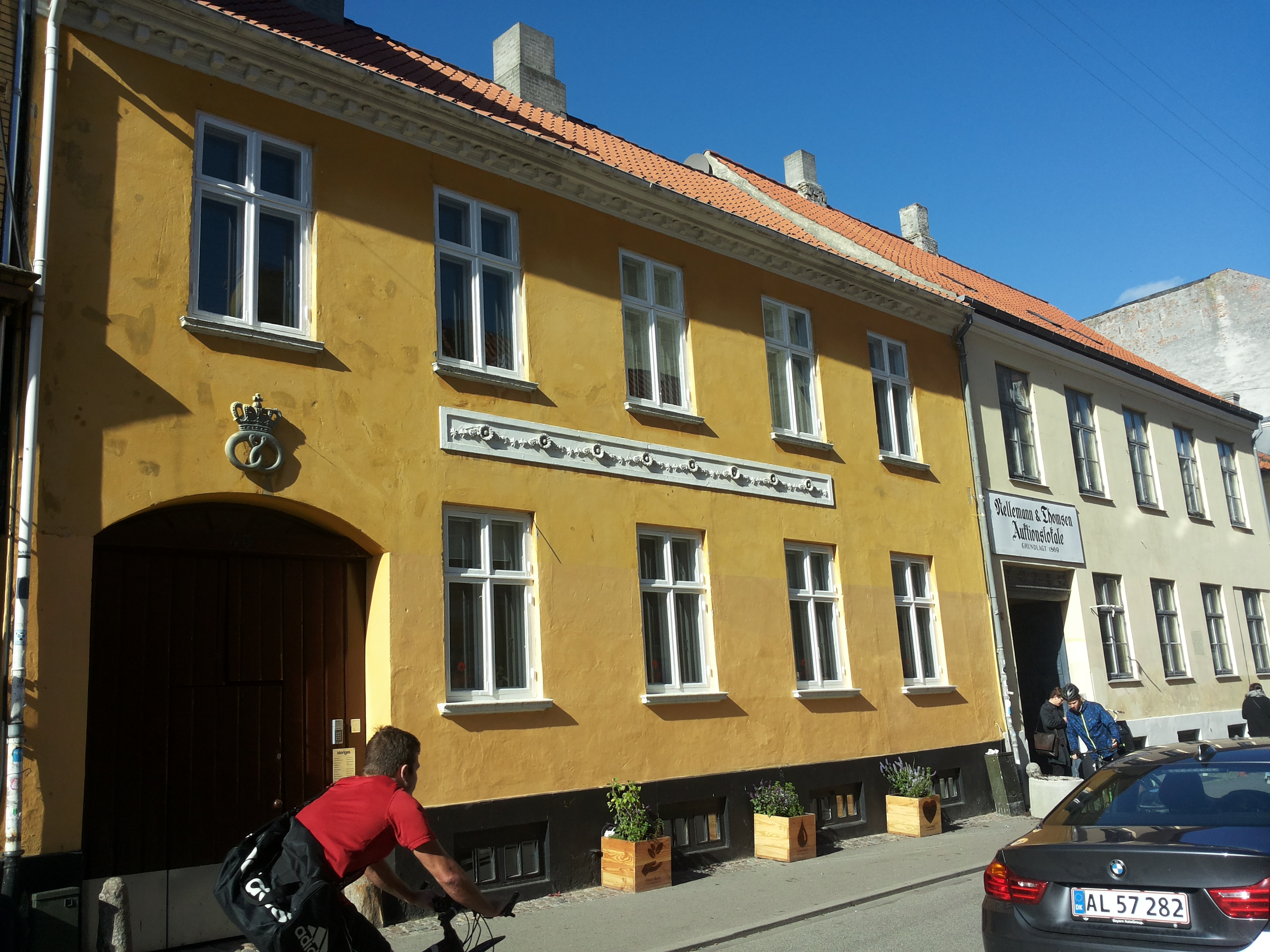
The Empire style Mejlgade no. 43

Former auction building (Mejlgade 45, backyard)

== Gallery ==
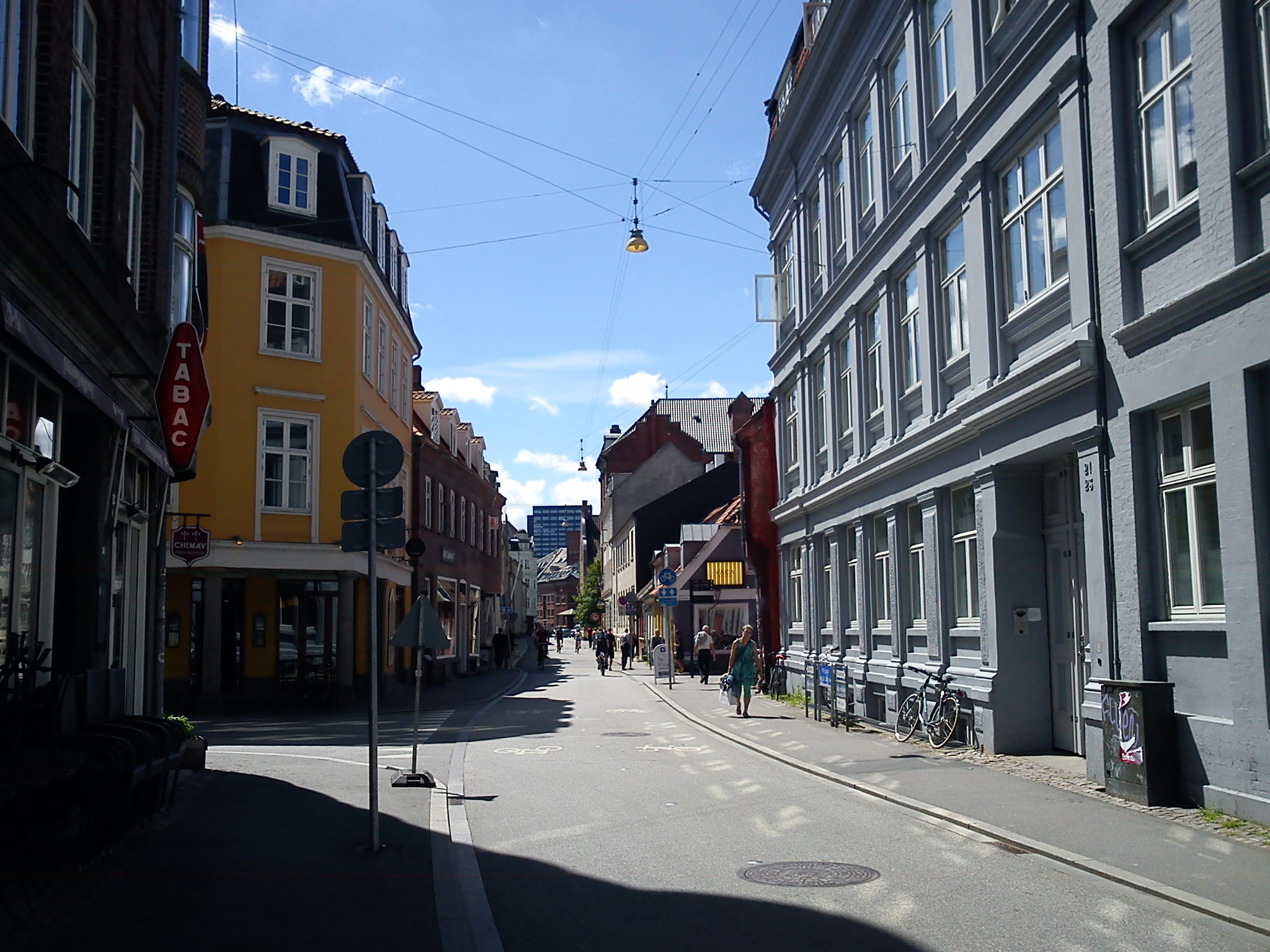
Mejlgade is prioritized for bicycles and pedestrians

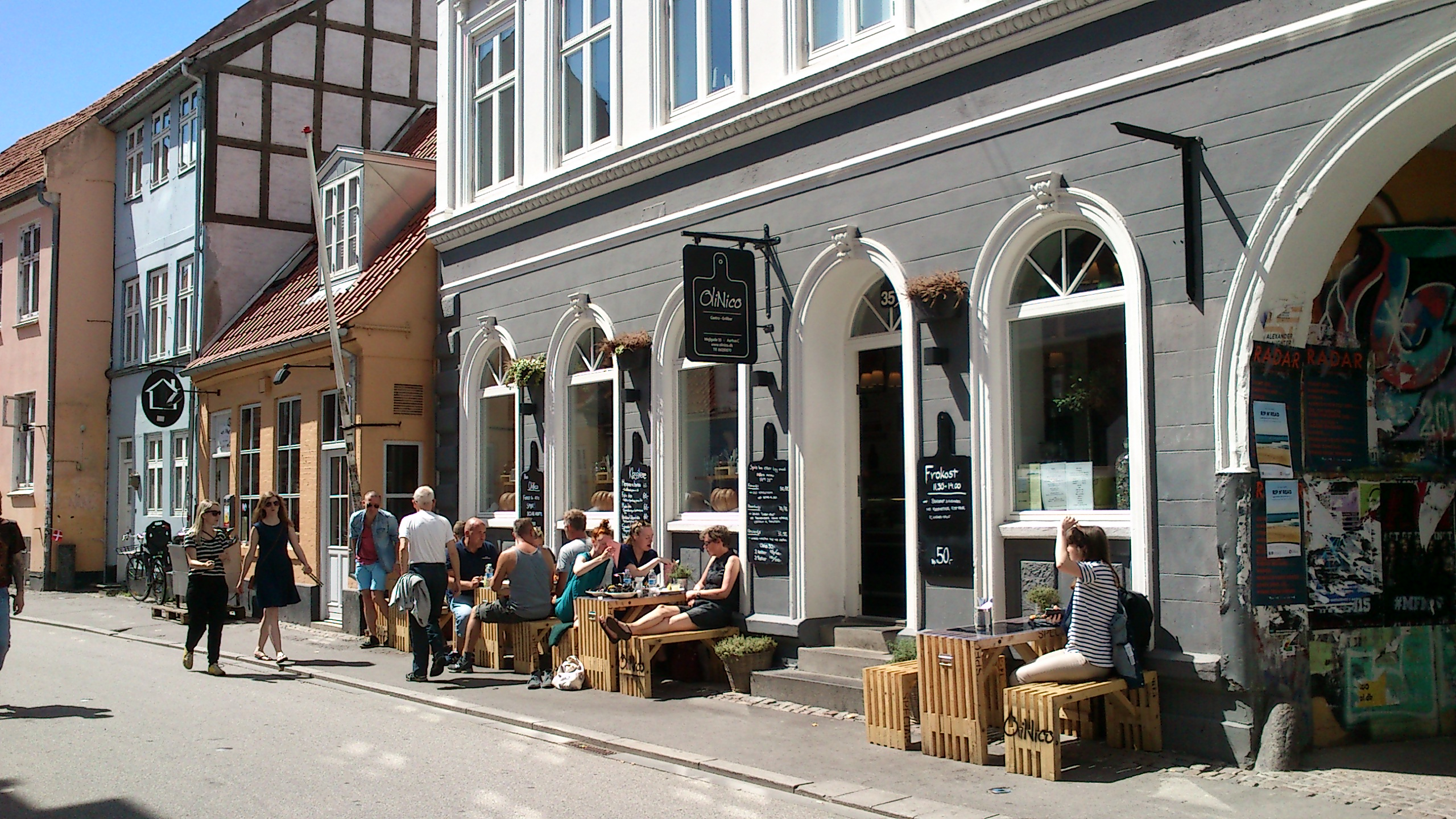
Restaurants and street life.

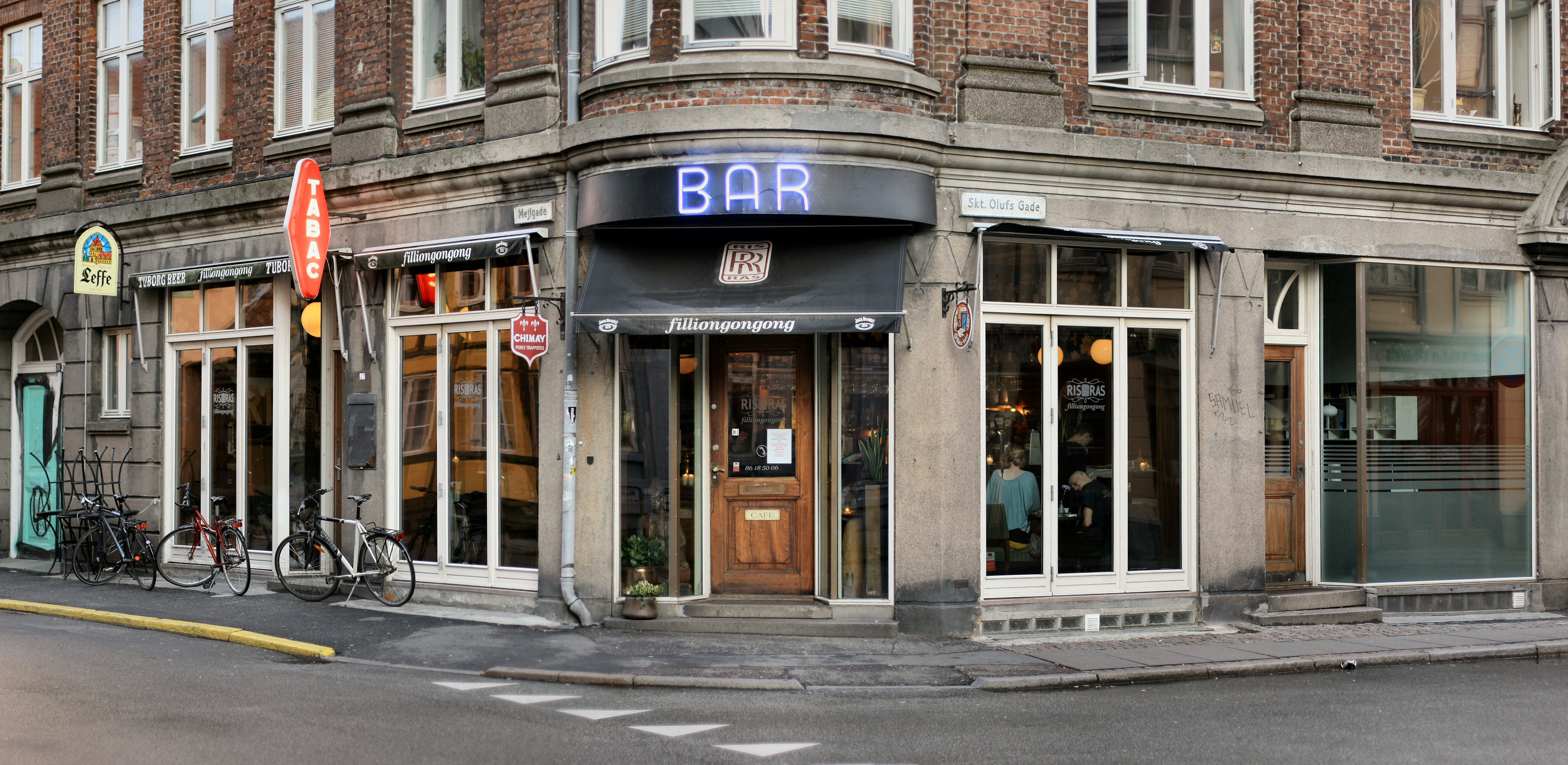
The bar Ris Ras Filiongongong
