= Latin Quarter, Aarhus =

Latin Quarter
- Neighborhood
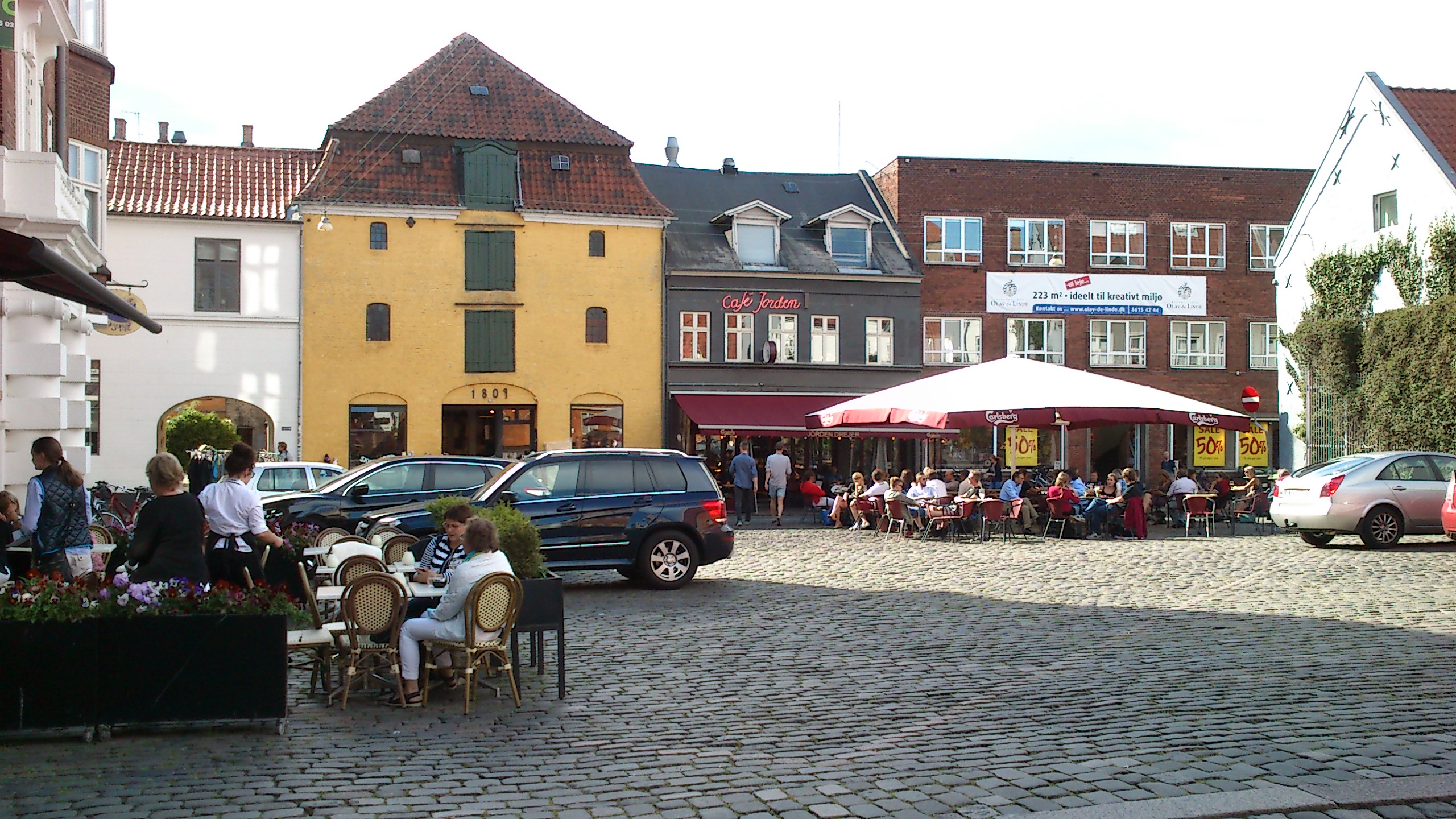
- Pustervig Torv town square

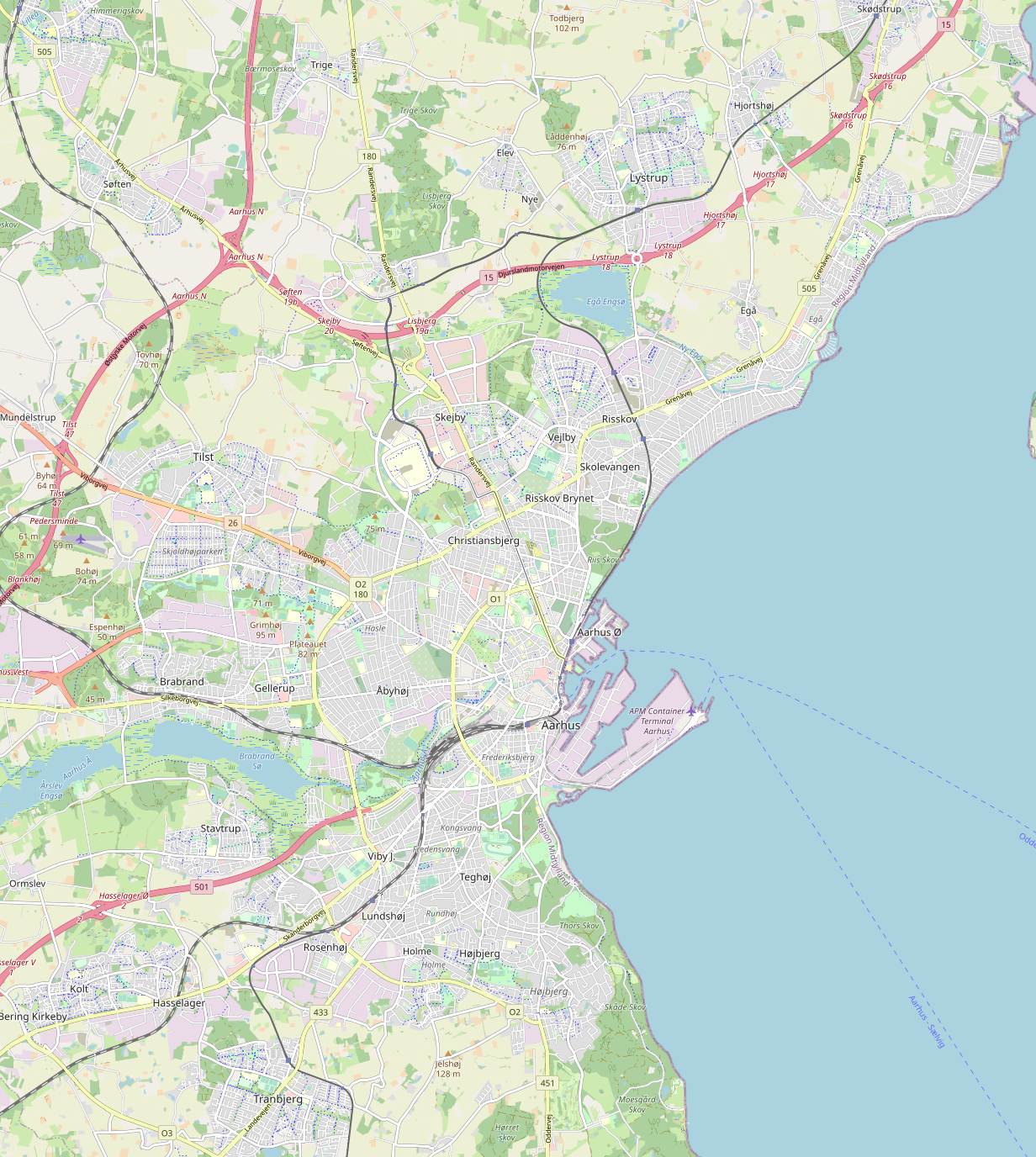
- Location within Aarhus
- Coordinates: 56.159°N 10.209°E
- Country: Kingdom of Denmark
- Regions of Denmark: Central Denmark Region
- Municipality: Aarhus Municipality
- District: Aarhus C
- Postal code: 8000

The Latin Quarter (Danish: Latinerkvarteret) in Aarhus is the oldest part of the city and is itself part of the inner city. The quarter comprise the streets of Badstuegade, Klostergade, Volden, Studsgade, Borggade, Rosensgade, Mejlgade and Graven, with Pustervig Torv as the main square.

The name Latinerkvarteret was officially adopted in the 1990s and reflects the areas similarities with the Latin Quarter of Paris by Rive Gauche. Some of the oldest houses date back to the 16th century. Latinerkvarteret is a busy center for shopping, there are many cafés and restaurants here and it has an active night life. The businesses of the area, has organised themselves in the local association of Latinerkvarteret Aarhus, but some are also represented in the larger business-organisation of Aarhus City Forening.

The Latin Quarter has a cultural life with small stages for live music, studios, galleries and workshops, and also educations for dance and street performance (with circus skills). The milieu here has fostered many influential cultural projects, including the renowned enterprise of KaosPilots.

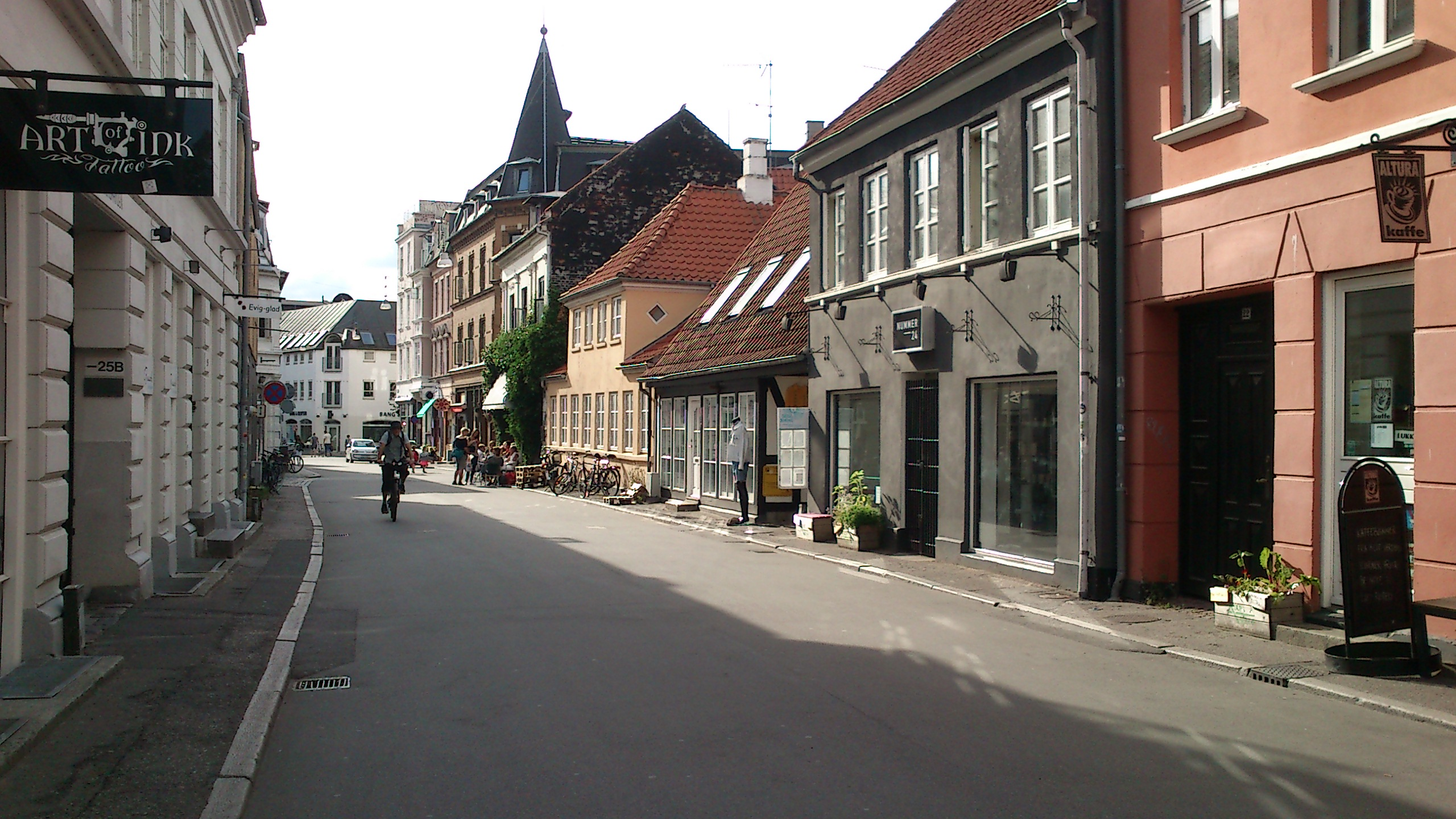
A typical street in Latinerkvarteret. From Graven

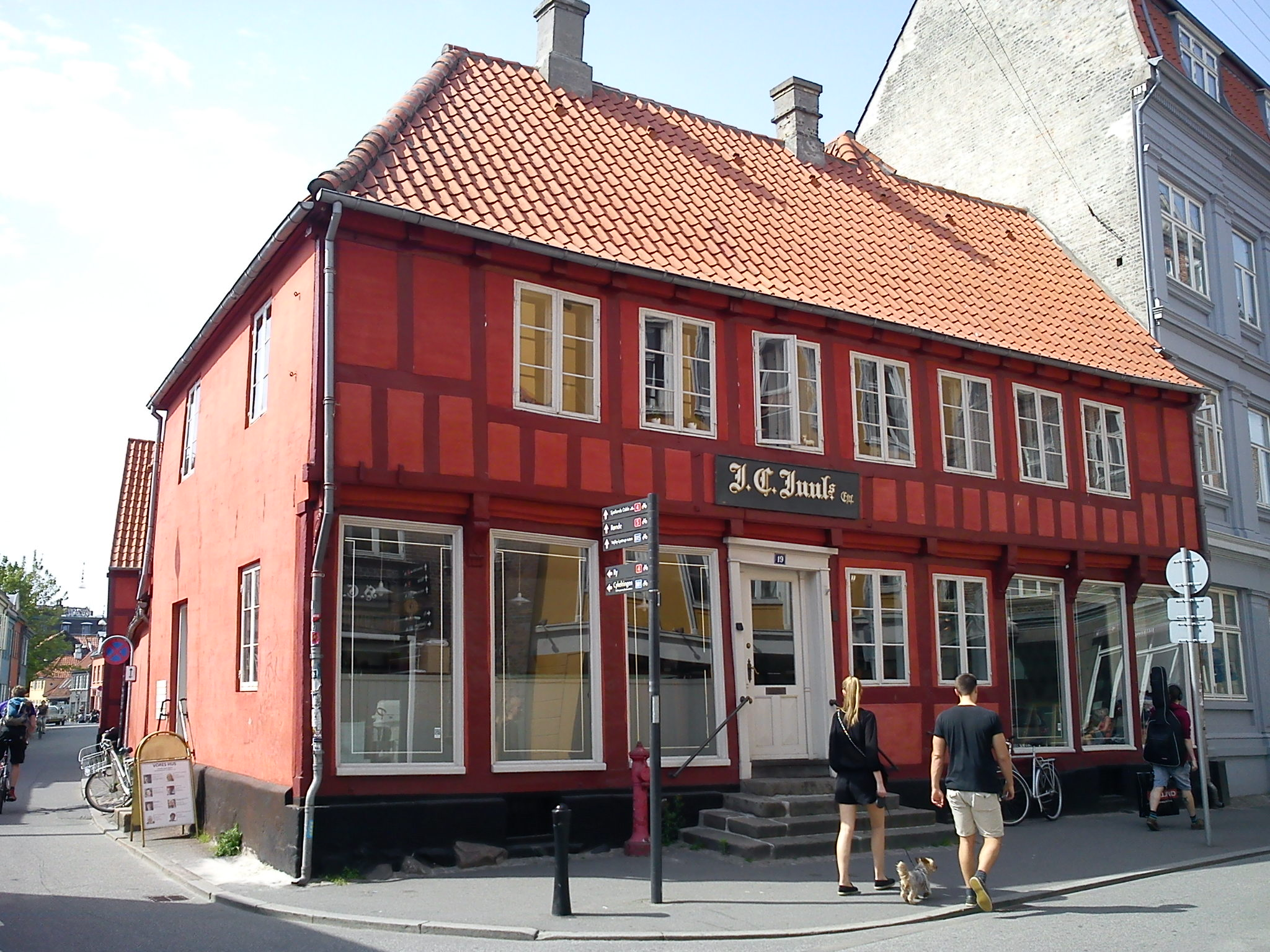
Juuls Gård, one of the oldest buildings in Aarhus

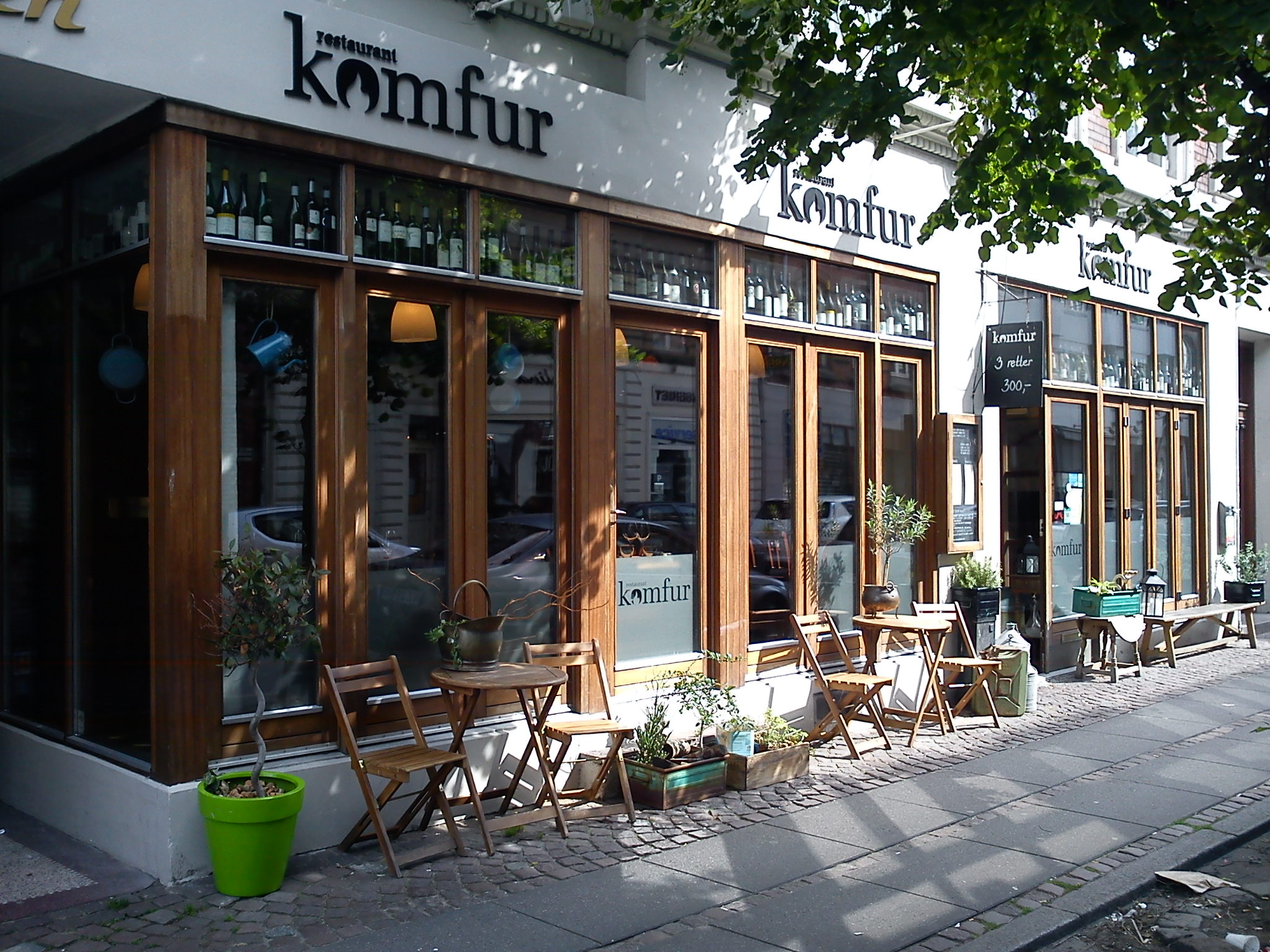
One of the many restaurants in the area

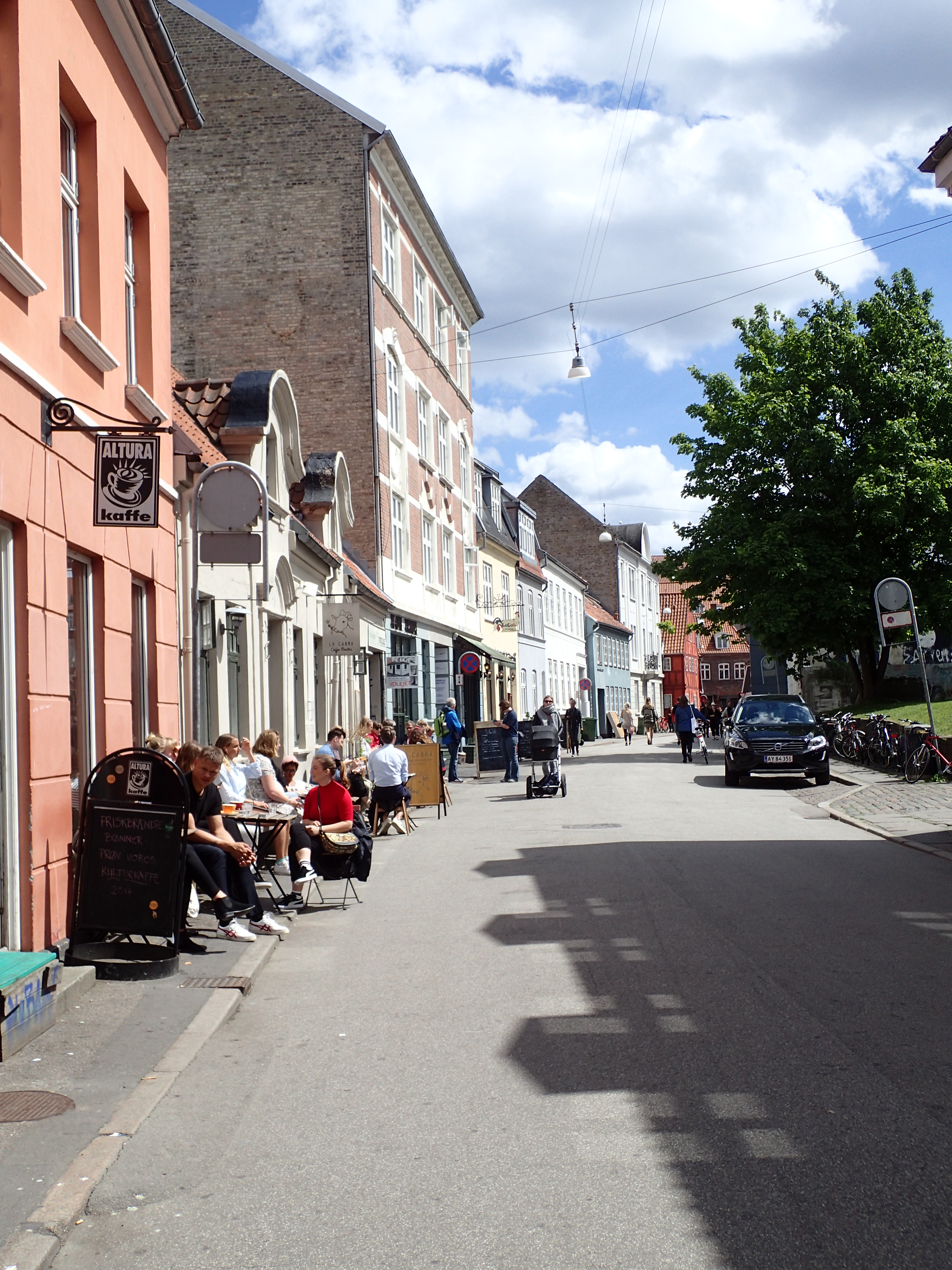
Cafés and street life

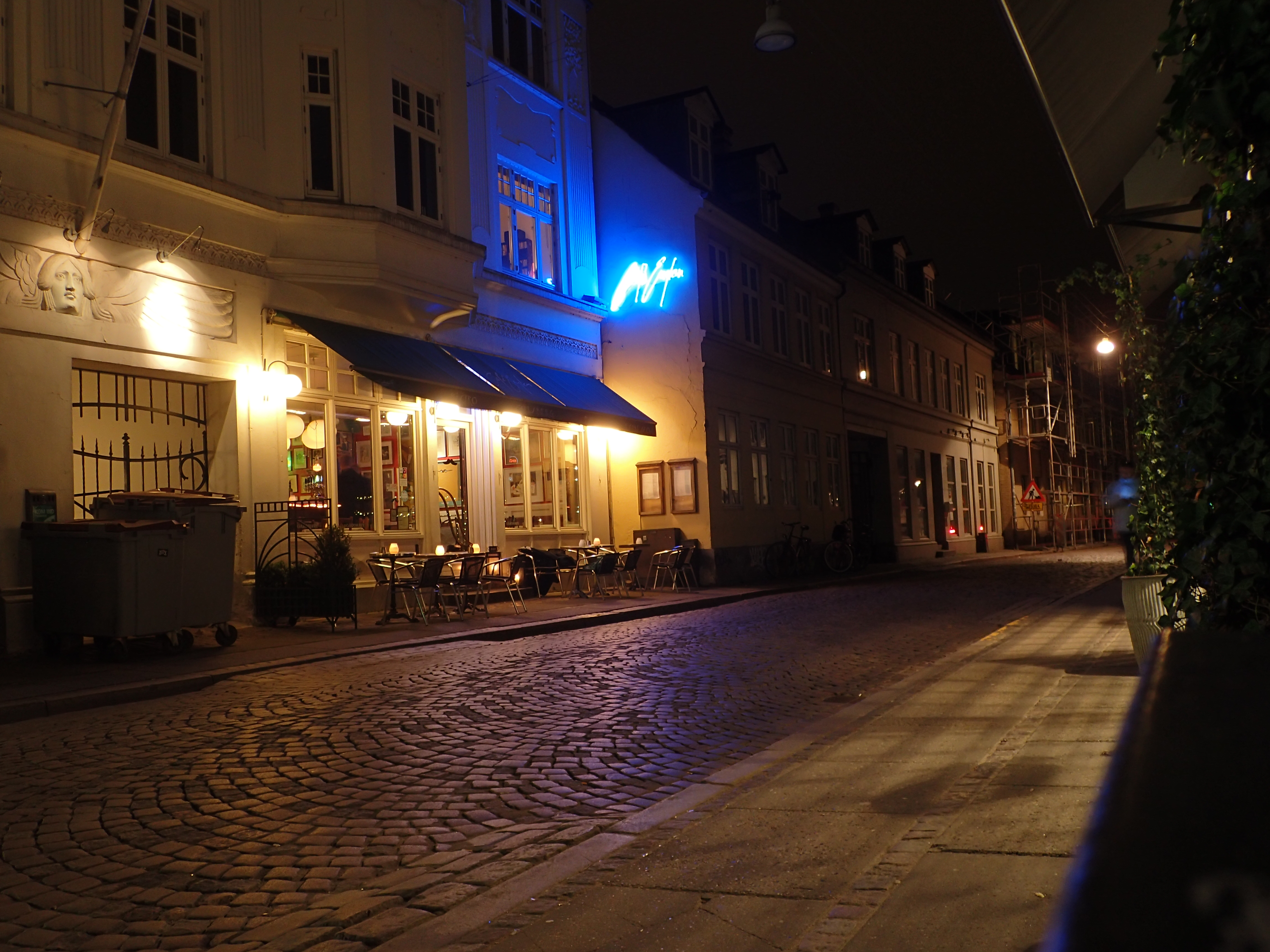
Night scene

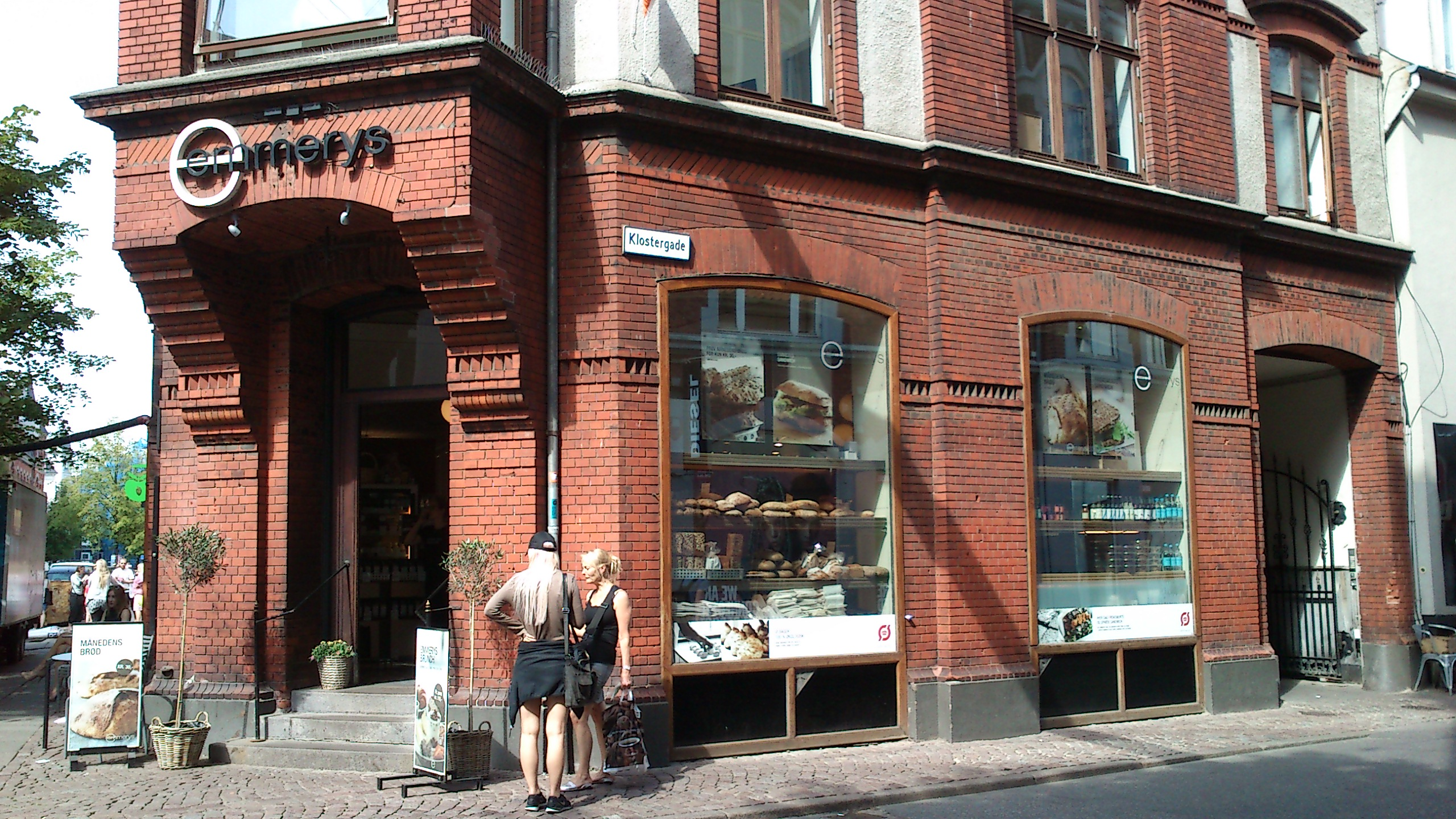
A chain bakery and café

== Sources ==
- Aarhus City Aarhus City Forening (in Danish)
- Latinerkvarteret i Aarhus Latinerkvarteret Aarhus (in Danish)
