= Hald =

Hald may refer to:

- Anders Hald (1913–2007), Danish statistician
- Margrethe Hald (1897-1982), Danish textile historian
- Pauline Hald (1904–1998), American clinical chemist
- HAL Daemon, often referred to as "HALD"

== See also ==
- includes several further persons with the name
- Hald Manor, building in Viborg municipality, Denmark
- Hald House, building in Copenhagen, Denmark
- Hald's House, building in Aarhus, Denmark
- High authority for the struggle against discrimination and for equality (HALDE)
- Jean-Baptiste Du Halde (1674–1743), French historian
