= DGI-Huset =

Sports center in Aarhus, Denmark

Coordinates: 56°08′56.7″N 10°12′23.6″E

- DGI Huset Aarhus
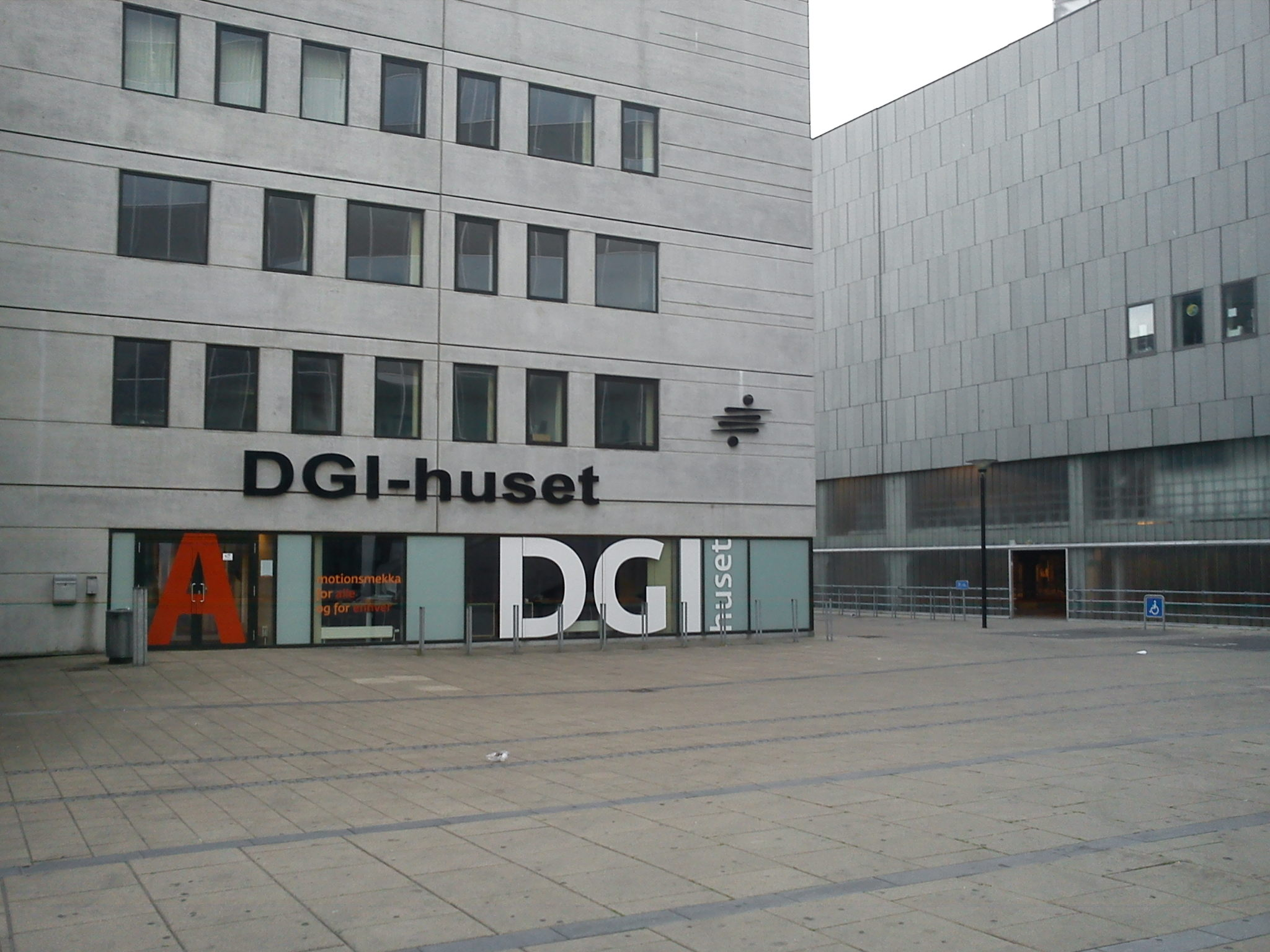
- DGI-Huset (main entrance)
- Interactive map of the DGI-Huset area

General information
- Location: Midtown, Aarhus, Denmark
- Completed: 1910
- Client: DGI

Website
- Official website

DGI-Huset or DGI Huset Aarhus is a sports center located in Aarhus, Denmark. Parts of the buildings are historic, built in 1910 as part of the Aarhus Central Workshops for the Danish national railway company DSB. In 1990, DSB closed and sold their repair facilities to Aarhus Municipality and in 1997 the sports organization of DGI bought the building. An extensive renovation and construction project was completed on 11 October 2003, including new extensions. The buildings now serves as the primary facility for the sports organization Danske Gymnastik- & Idrætsforeninger in Aarhus, featuring a number of sports facilities, conference rooms. It is also home to some local sports clubs. The organization DGI-Århusegnen, the local chapter of the national organization DGI, took initiative to establish the sports center in the building.

== Facilities ==
There are 3 halls of different sizes in addition to a trampoline hall, climbing wall and rhythmic hall. A new house was built in front of the old repair facilities and it connects to a fourth building which contains reception, café, conference rooms and a commercial wellness shop on 110 m². The facilities in the fourth building can be used for meetings of up to 60 people and quiet activities such as yoga and pilates. In August 2007 DGI-huset was expanded with fitness and spinning facilities in the two bottom floors of the neighboring Baumann House which originally contained the train repair yard offices. The facilities are for both sports organizations and people who are not members of an organization.

== Architecture ==
DGI-huset has a floor area of some 5.000 m², mainly in a listed building in the area of the former train and rail central workshops. It is situated next to Bruuns Galleri and Aarhus Central Station. The renovation in 2003 was carried out by the construction company NCC by drawings from the architect firms Schmidt Hammer Lassen and 3XN while Rambøll was the leading engineer on the project. The building is 3 connected halls which used to here locomotives were brought for repair.

Original details from the repair facilities are preserved in the renovated buildings. The large gates letting trains into the building are still there along with the internal cranes that could be moved along the length of the building. Other features are the characteristic shed-roof with windows facing north and the large windows - some 10 meters tall with iron frames and some only 6 meters tall with the original wooden frames. The renovation also preserved the raw, industrial look of the buildings - visible support structures, large skylights and naked brick walls.

== See also ==
- Architecture of Aarhus
