= Thorup's Kælder =

Coordinates: 56.1570°N 10.2088°E

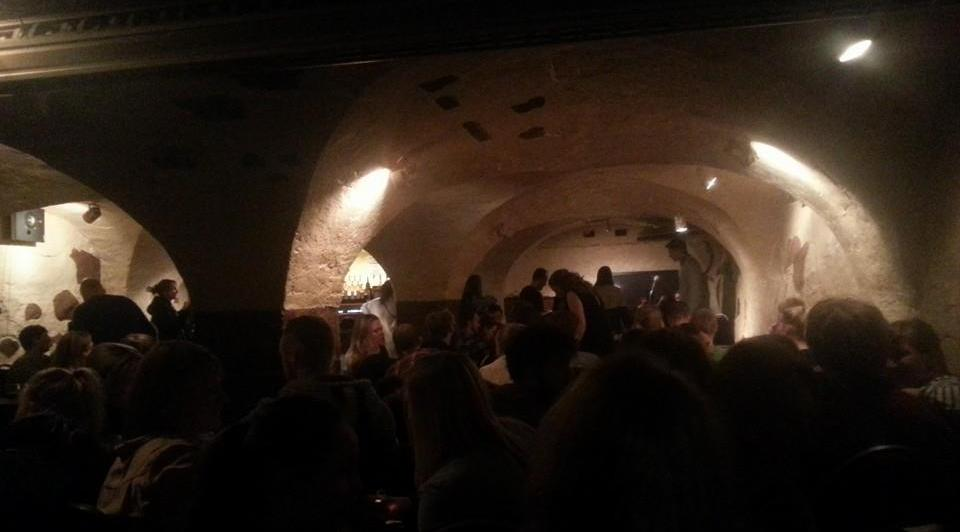
- Interactive map of the Thorup's Kælder area

General information
- Location: Aarhus, Denmark
- Completed: 1300s

Technical details
- Floor count: 1

Thorup's Kælder (lit. 'Thorup's Basement') is a listed structure and a bar in Aarhus, Denmark. It is a basement built in approximately 1300 by Cistercian monks. The basement was listed on the Danish registry of protected buildings and places by the Danish Heritage Agency on 1 January 1959. The listing is officially "Den Grå Kannikegård" (English: The Grey Canon House) which refers to the entirety of the building at the address although only the basement beneath it is protected. The structure is situated in the historic Latin Quarter neighbourhood on Store Torv adjacent to the Cathedral.

== Basement ==
The basement consists of a number of vaulted rooms with arched columns made of brick. It was constructed by Cistercian monks in the 1300s but not much else is known about it or the structure originally above it. The front entrance displays a sign stating that it was built by the monks and that they used it as a dining hall. There is, however, no evidence to support the latter claim. Another myth states that a secret tunnel leads from the basement to the nearby Cathedral but this is also not true.

== Bar ==
The basement was first used as a bar in 1712 when the local postmaster operated a wine store there but it is not known for how long. In 1885 Albert Christian Thorup opened a new wine store and in 1903 he was granted permission to run a bar. Albert Thorup had strong religious convictions and banned women from the premises since he believed the Old Testament stated the women were bad for wine. In 1919 Thorup moved to Bourdeaux to open a new business and his son Knud Thorup took over the bar in Aarhus.

In 1942 Knud Thorup retired and gave the business to his daughter and son-in-law Kristen and Erik Thorup Christensen. The bar continued with no major changes to the rooms until 1959 when the basement was listed and protected. C. F. Møller Architects have since renovated and decorated the rooms and the director of the Old Town Museum Helge Søgaard designed the chairs. Kirsten and Erik Thorup Christensen managed the bar until the mid-80s when it was sold to Albert Hill and since to Mike Wilson.
