= Jarlsminde =

Coordinates: 56.1328°N 10.1276°E

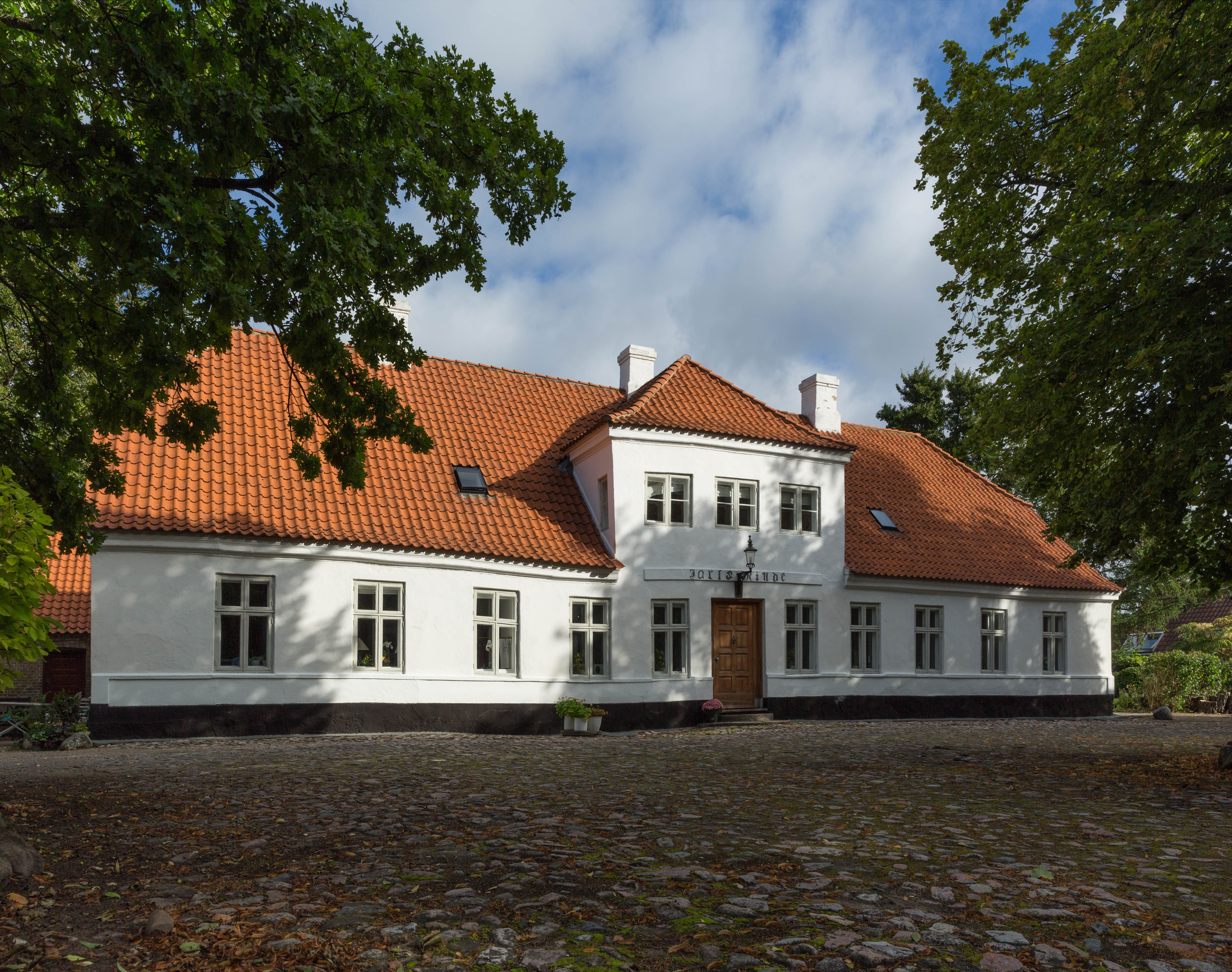
- Interactive map of the Jarlsminde area

General information
- Location: Aarhus, Denmark
- Completed: 1798

Technical details
- Floor count: 2
- Floor area: 240 m^{2} (2,600 sq ft)

Jarlsminde is a farm and a listed building in Aarhus, Denmark. The farm was built in 1798 and was listed in the Danish national registry of protected buildings and places by the Danish Heritage Agency on 3 June 1997. The farm is situated in the suburb Stavtrup about 7-8 km. south-west of the city centre of Aarhus where it sits on a hill with a view of Brabrand Lake and the large urban areas on the other side of it.

The farm was originally built for Countess Wedel-Jarlsberg. The farm consists of the main two-story building and an outbuilding. The main building was constructed in 1798 and lightly remodeled in 1820. The center of the building is split in a small living room with an adjacent garden room. The eastern section has one large room while the western part is divided in a kitchen and two smaller rooms. From the central living room stairs adorned with classical balusters lead to the upper floor which has a bathroom and a number of smaller rooms. The house contains an iron stove from Bærum Ironworks in Norway from 1820.

The main building is painted white with red winged brick. Cornices of masonry drape around the building on all sides and the roof on the gables are half-hipped while the dormers are hipped. The outbuilding is constructed of boulders with gables of yellow brick and contains a preserved bakery with oven and a partially buried milking room.
