= Det Norske Hus =

Coordinates: 56.1821°N 10.2262°E

The Norwegian House
- Det norske hus
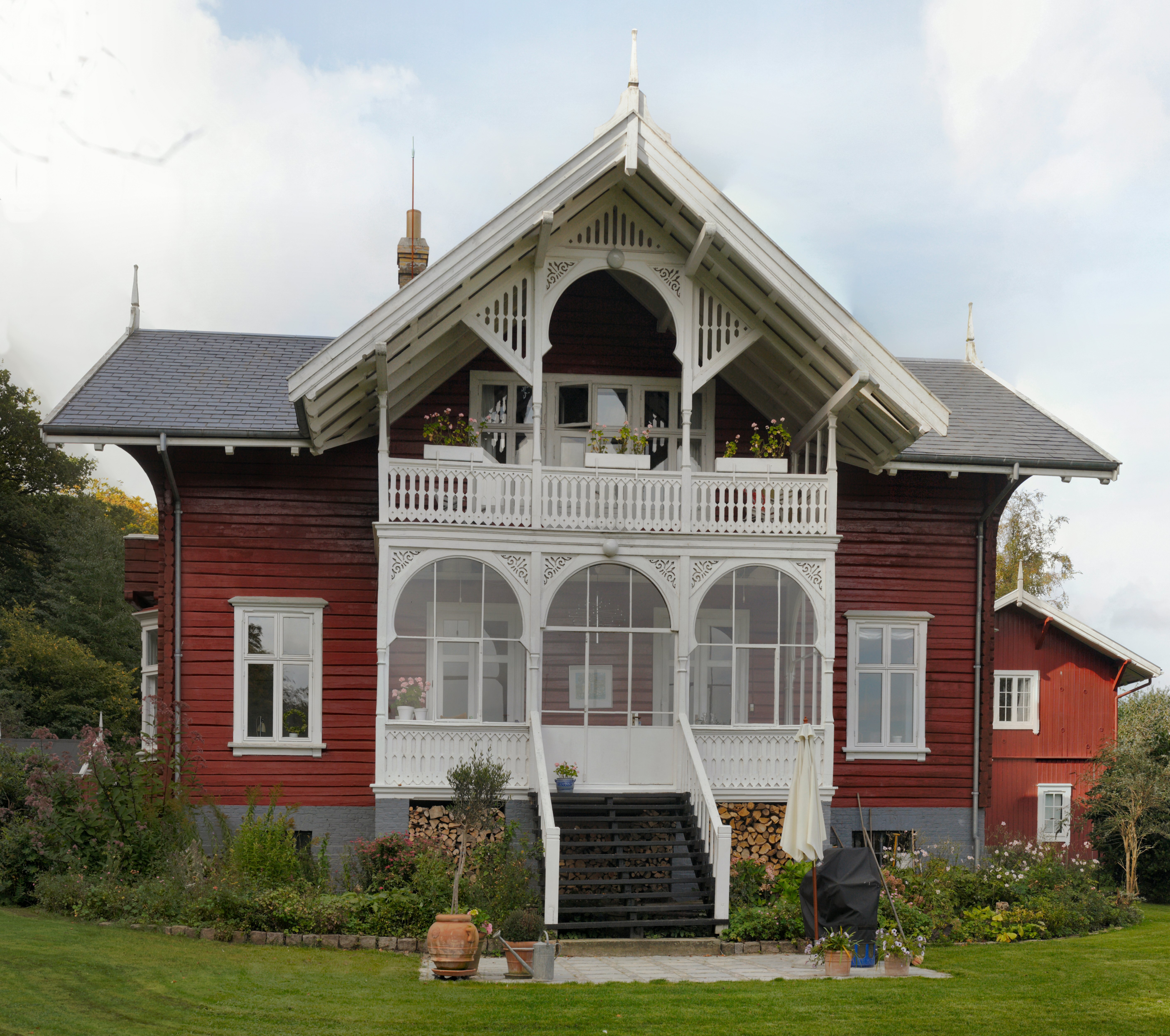
- Interactive map of the The Norwegian House area

General information
- Architectural style: National romantic
- Location: Aarhus, Denmark
- Completed: 1888

Technical details
- Floor count: 2
- Floor area: 269 m^{2} (2,900 sq ft)

Design and construction
- Architect: Martin Nyrop

Det Norske Hus (lit. 'The Norwegian House') is a listed building in Aarhus, Denmark. The house was first built in 1888 and it was listed in the Danish national registry of protected buildings and places by the Danish Heritage Agency on 14 October 1996. The house is situated on the northern border of Riis Skov in the northern neighbourhood Risskov. The building is today privately owned and used as a home.

The Norwegian House was originally built for the Nordic Exhibition of 1888 in Copenhagen by the architect Martin Nyrop. The house was part of a themed exhibit featuring a number of wooden houses of which several have survived until today. The Norwegian house was bought by Cecilia Meisner who had it rebuilt in new neighbourhood in Risskov in 1890. Another house, the Swedish House (Danish: Det Svenske Hus), was bought by Queen Louise who placed it in Bernstoffparken (Bernstoff Park) in Gentofte. The Swedish House was listed in 1987 and the Norwegian House was listed in 1996. At least two more of Nyrop's wooden buildings survive and are situated at Frederiksberg Hospital.

== Architecture ==
Nyrop elected to make all of his exhibition pavilions of wood at a time when iron and glass was favored for temporary structures. He justified the decision by claiming the result would be prettier for the same cost. His background as a carpenter may have been an influence and it gave him the opportunity to showcase his ideals of quality materials and visible construction principles. The Norwegian House is inspired by Nordic log architecture, wood ornamentation and polychromy which mirror the National romantic currents in architecture at the time.

The house is constructed of wooden logs painted Swedish red contrasted by white windows and balcony. The roof is ridged and plated in slate. The house combines symmetrical and asymmetrical elements. The western side is symmetrical with three windows, both gables are asymmetrical with bay windows on the ground floor and balconies on the 1st floor and the symmetrical garden facade to the east has a dominating loggia porch with a large covered balcony on top.
