= Baumann House (Aarhus) =

Coordinates: 56.1486°N 10.2055°E

- Baumannhuset
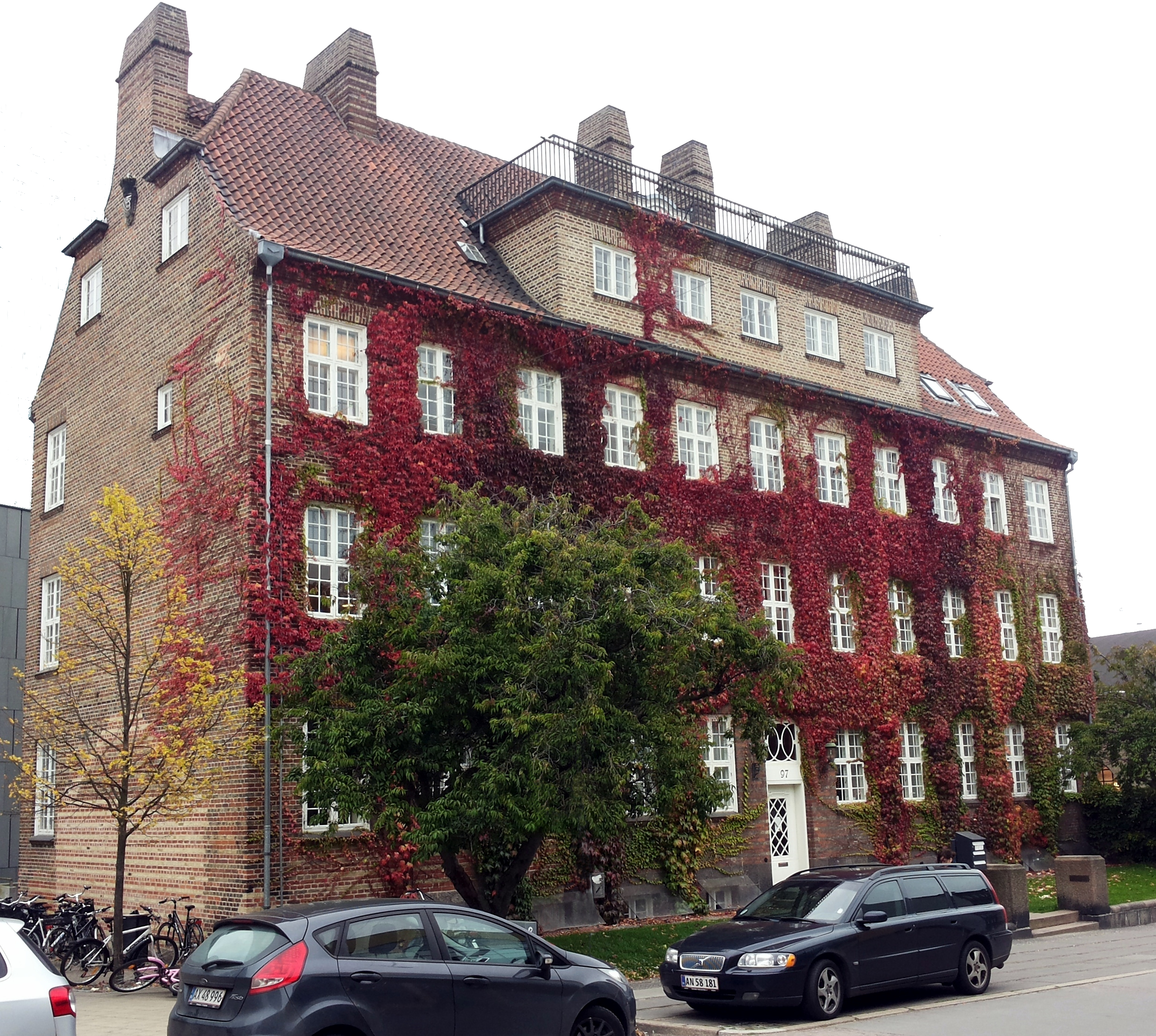
- Interactive map of the Baumann House area

General information
- Architectural style: Neoclassical
- Location: Aarhus, Denmark
- Construction started: 1908
- Completed: 1911

Technical details
- Floor count: 4
- Floor area: 848 m^{2} (9,130 sq ft)

Design and construction
- Architect: Povl Baumann

The Baumann House is a listed building in Aarhus, Denmark. The building was constructed in 1911 and was listed in the national Danish registry of protected buildings and places by the Danish Heritage Agency on 18 September 1996. The building is situated in the central Indre By neighborhood on Jægergårdsgade adjacent to the Aarhus Central Workshops.

== History ==
The building was constructed as the administrative offices of the Danish National Railroad's central rail workshops in Aarhus. The workshops had been the primary repair facility for trains and trams in Jutland and Fuenen from 1880 and the workforce had grown steadily to some 750 people by 1910. The constant expansion of the national railroads and the growing rolling stock meant the workshops were constantly expanding necessitating an administrative unit to oversee the work. The office building was completed in 1911.

The workforce peaked with some 1850 people in the post-war years but in the 1950s repair work was gradually centralized in Copenhagen and the workforce gradually started shrinking in the following decades. in 1990 DSB decided to close the facility and reassign the remaining 140 workers. The buildings were listed in 1995 after which they were sold off.

In 2007 the two bottom floors were used for fitness and spinning.

== Architecture ==
The building was designed by Povl Baumann from whom the building gets its name. The building features imposing proportions and, unlike other structures in the area, stands independently, separated from nearby buildings. It is located on the highest point in the area, atop a hill overlooking the workshops below. The building is constructed of red brick, similar to most other structures in the vicinity. The roof is pitched and features a large dormer window on the front facade with a balcony on top while there's a series of smaller dormer windows behind. Brick cornices frame the eaves on the front and back.
