= Harlev Rectory =

Coordinates: 56.1325°N 10.0106°E

- Harlev Præstegård
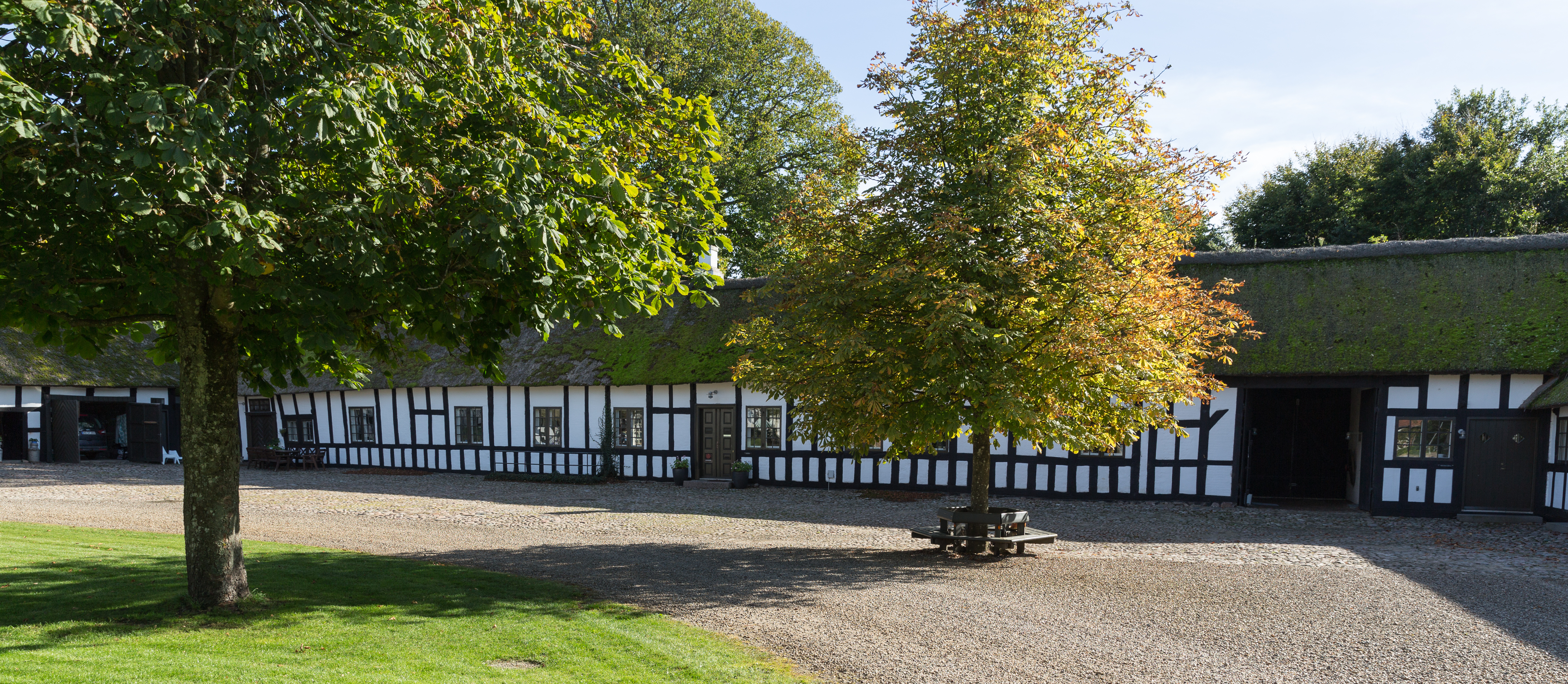
- Interactive map of the Harlev Rectory area

General information
- Architectural style: Half-timbered
- Location: Harlev, Denmark
- Completed: 1732

Technical details
- Floor count: 1

Harlev Rectory (Danish: Harlev Præstegård) is the rectory of the Harlev and Framlev pastorate and a listed building in Aarhus Municipality, Denmark. The rectory was completed in 1732 and was listed by the Danish Heritage Agency on 3 March 1950. Originally it was the rectory of the adjoining Gl. Harlev Church but the Harlev and Framlev pastorates have been merged so the priest today serve both parishes. The rectory is owned by the Church of Denmark along with the church itself.

== Architecture ==
The rectory consists of 3 buildings surrounding a central courtyard to the east, west and south. The 3 wings are typical for farms of the time. The buildings are half-timbered with whitewashed walls with exposed wooden supports and stand on a base of granite boulders. The roofs are thatched with straw with a ridged roof construction in the central building and a hip roof on the side wings. The main building features a dormer window above the main door and a wooden cornice running the length of all three buildings.
