= Kærbygård =

Danish manor house

Coordinates: 56.2109°N 10.1292°E

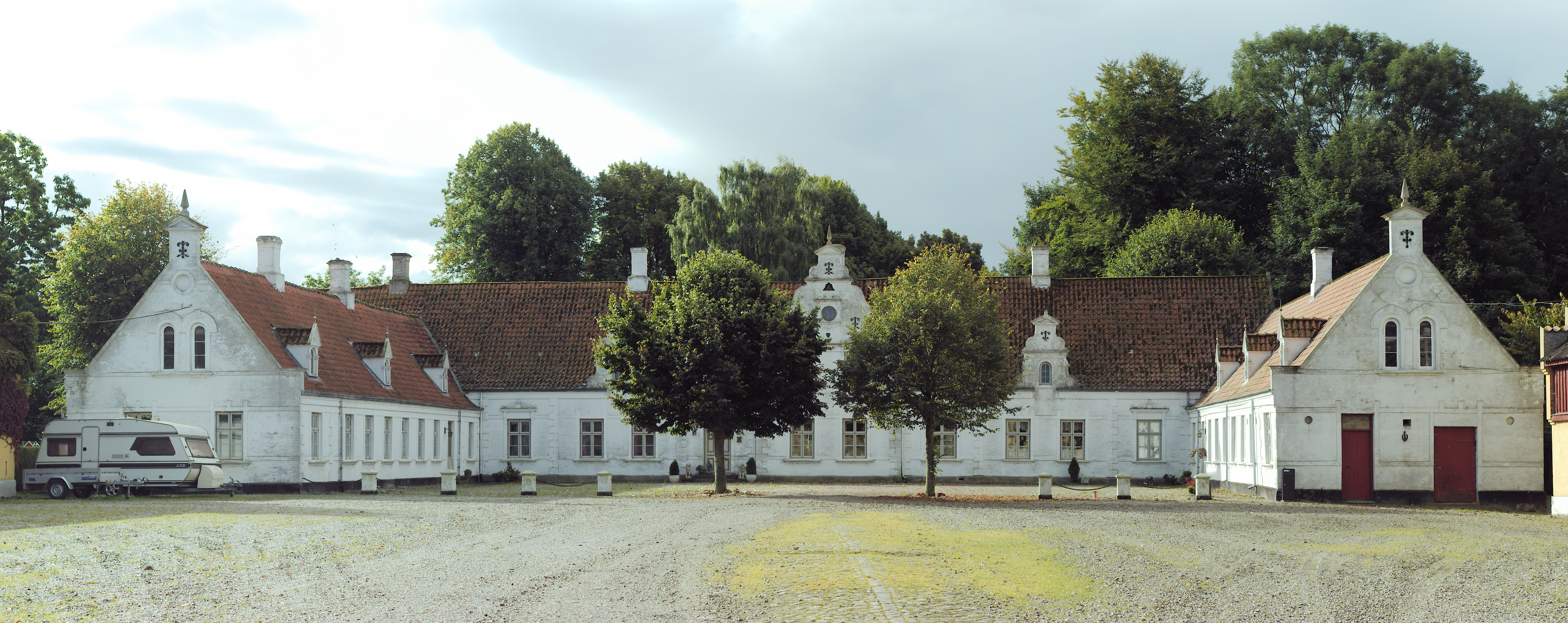
- Interactive map of the Kærbygård area

General information
- Architectural style: Half-timbered
- Location: Harlev, Denmark
- Completed: 1768

Technical details
- Floor count: 2

Kærbygård is a manor house and a listed building in Aarhus Municipality, Denmark. The manor was built in 1768 and was listed by the Danish Heritage Agency on 16 April 1990. The estate has been an active farm since it was built.

The Kærbygård farm was moved to its present location north of Egå and the village of Kasted in 1680. In 1768 the original 3 winged half-timbered estate was built. In 1880 the facades facing the courtyard were renovated and rebuilt in brick, originally with exposed red bricks, but today whitewashed with neo-renaissance elements. In 1928 two parallel brick buildings for livestock were built in front of the manor building, held in yellow and red and with characteristic crow-stepped gables.
