= Nordia 2017 =

International stamp exhibition (Nordia, 2017)

Nordia 2017 Stamp Exhibition
- Venue: DGI-Huset
- Location: Vejle, Denmark
- Type: Philatelic exhibition

The Nordia 2017 Stamp Exhibition was an international stamp exhibition held 27–29 October 2017 at the Spektrum and DGI-Huset in Vejle, Denmark. The exhibition was granted patronage from the Federation of European Philatelic Associations (FEPA).

The event included the 4th International Polar Philatelic Exhibition.

== Palmares ==
The Grand Prix awards went to the following exhibits:

The Grand Prix Nordic went to Klaas Biermann for ‘Norway Coat Of Arms 1855-1868‘ (92 points).

The Grand Prix International went to Per Bunnstad for ‘Albatross: A Dramatic Event during the First World War‘ (92 points).

The Grand Prix National went to Torben Malm for ‘Service Stamps of Denmark, 1871-1924‘ (95 points).

The Polar Grand went to Hugh Osborne for ‘South Georgia Postal History, 1904-1942‘.
