= Herskind's House =

Coordinates: 56.1537°N 10.2032°E

- Herskinds Gård or Købmand Herskinds Gård
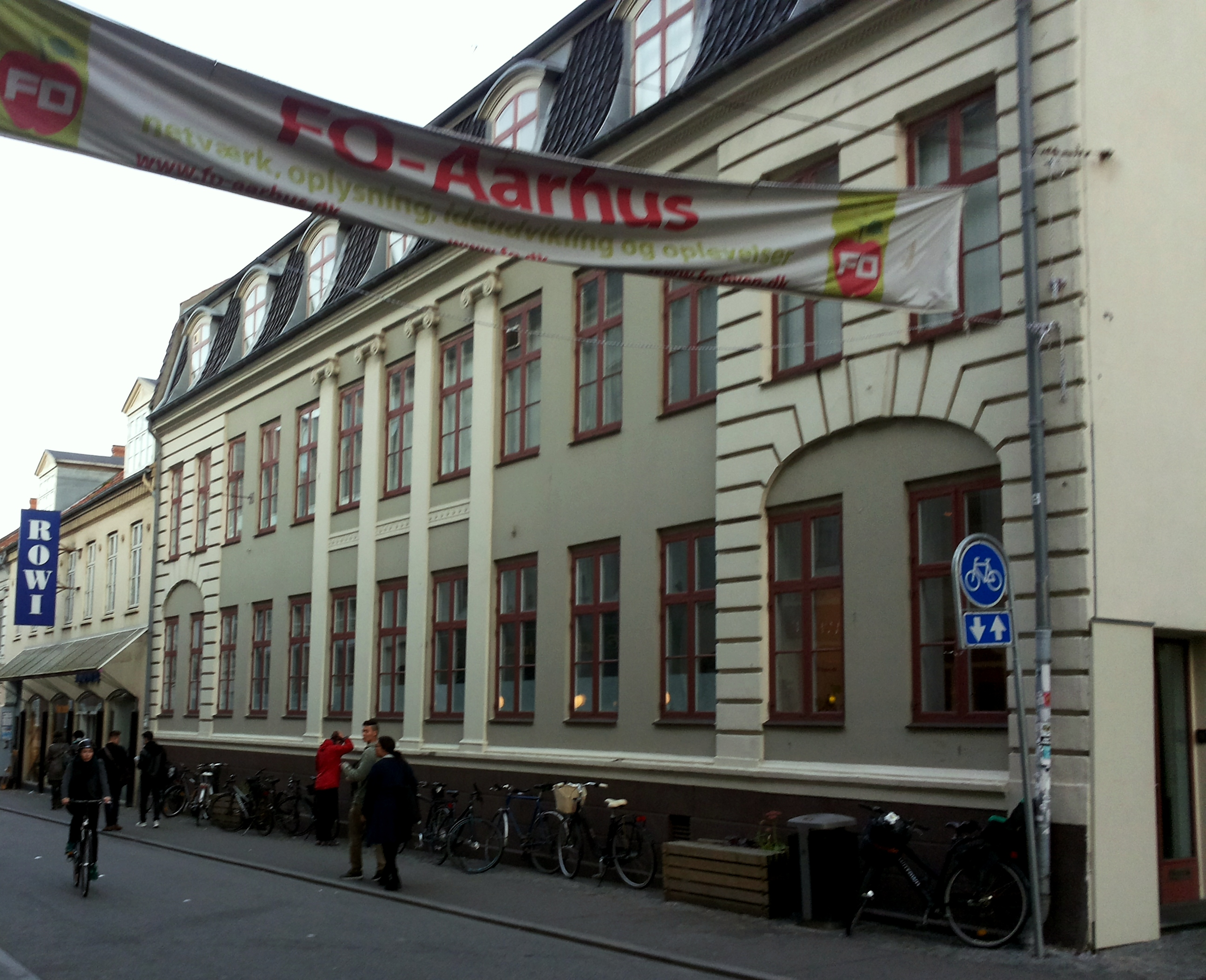
- Interactive map of the Herskind's House area

General information
- Architectural style: Classicism, Empire
- Location: Aarhus, Denmark
- Completed: 1850

Technical details
- Floor count: 3
- Floor area: 2,085 m^{2} (22,440 sq ft)

Design and construction
- Architect: Anton Gert Monrad

Herskind's House (Danish: Herskinds Gård) is a house and a listed building in Aarhus, Denmark. The house was built in approximately 1850 and was listed on the Danish registry of protected buildings and places by the Danish Heritage Agency on 2 October 1970. The house is situated in the historic Indre by neighborhood on Frederiksgade, close to the City Hall.

== History ==
The house was built in 1850 by the architect Anton Gert Monrad for Michael Herskind who was a prominent merchant and politician at the time. Michael Herskind was a member of the city council between 1848–1860, vice president of the city council between 1848–1854 and president 1854–1860. He also held positions as the city representative in the housing commission, budget commission and school commission at different times. Herskind belonged to one of the older merchant families of the city and after spending some years in Hamburg and London he established himself in Aarhus with an import business.

The building consisted of the main building constructed by Herskind and two other wings; a half-timbered back building from 1726 which was renovated by Herskind during construction of the main building and another smaller building facing the street. When Herskind left the property the buildings was owned by a series of merchants who expanded the property at different times. In 1865 a connection was constructed between the main house and the south-wing and in 1858 a low north-wing was built.

In 1907 a missionary hotel was established in the building. In 1919–1924 the hotel was bought by a local factory owner who turned it into a regular hotel. During this period artworks from many artists such as Peder Mørk Mønsted and P.S. Krøyer accumulated in the hotel that had become a popular destination for tourists. The hotel lasted until 1977 when the building was bought by Aarhus Municipality which thoroughly renovated it. The building became home to different administrative departments under the city until the building was put up for sale in 2010 and bought by an NGO.

== Architecture ==
The main structure is a 3 story classicist and empire style building with mansard roof with prominent dormer windows. The facades are plastered and painted beige or off-white with red window frames.
