= Rosensgade 38 =

Coordinates: 56.1580°N 10.2086°E

- Rosensgade 38
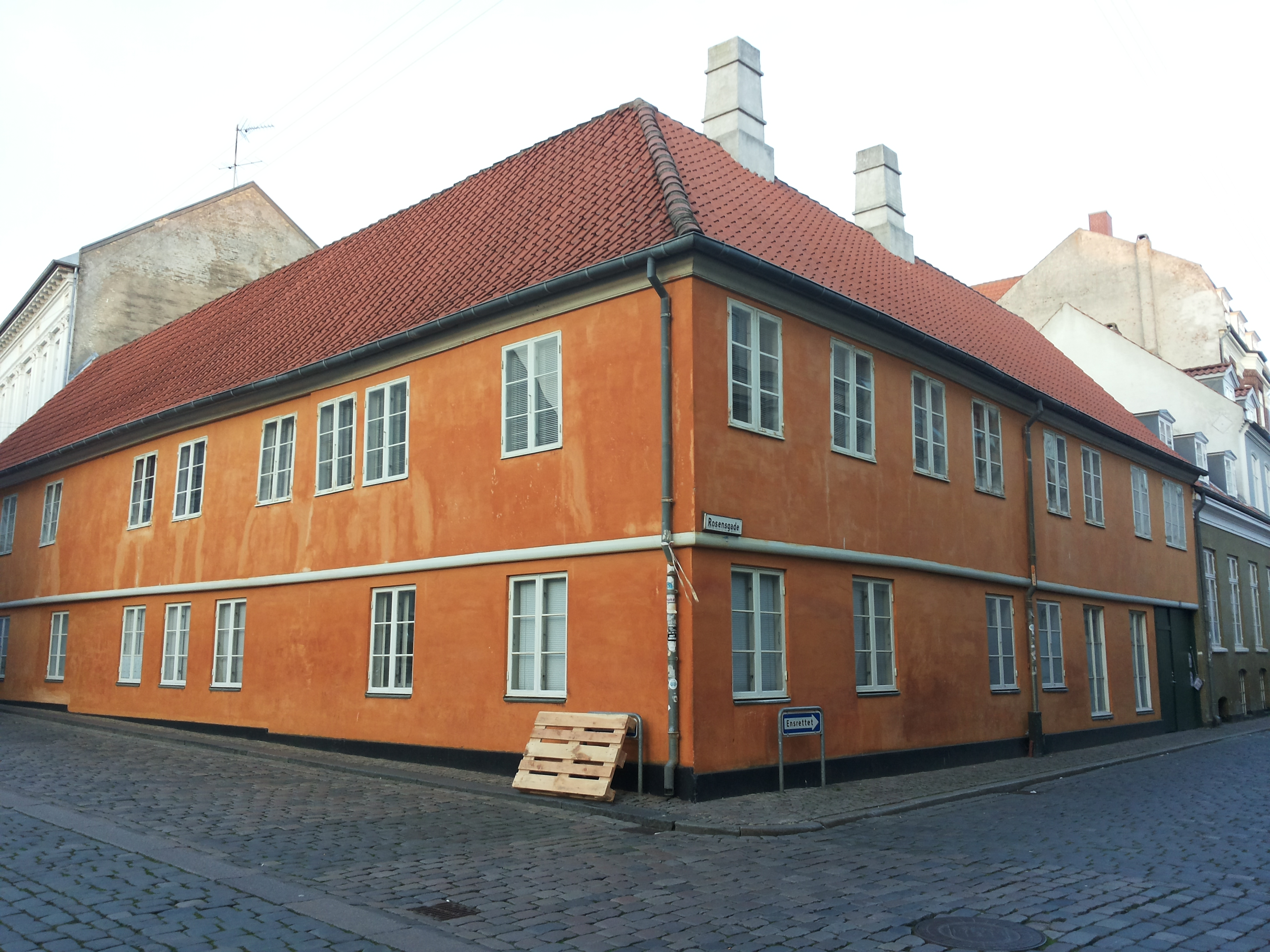
- Interactive map of the Rosensgade 38 area

General information
- Location: Aarhus, Denmark
- Completed: c. 1600

Technical details
- Floor count: 1
- Floor area: 505 m^{2} (5,440 sq ft)

Rosensgade 38 is a house and a listed building in Aarhus, Denmark. The house was built in approximately 1600 and was listed on the Danish registry of protected buildings and places by the Danish Heritage Agency on 21 March 2012. The building is situated in the historic Latin Quarter neighborhood on Pustervig square in the city center.
