= Tarskov Mill Farm =

Coordinates: 56.1246°N 10.0037°E

- Tarskov Møllegård
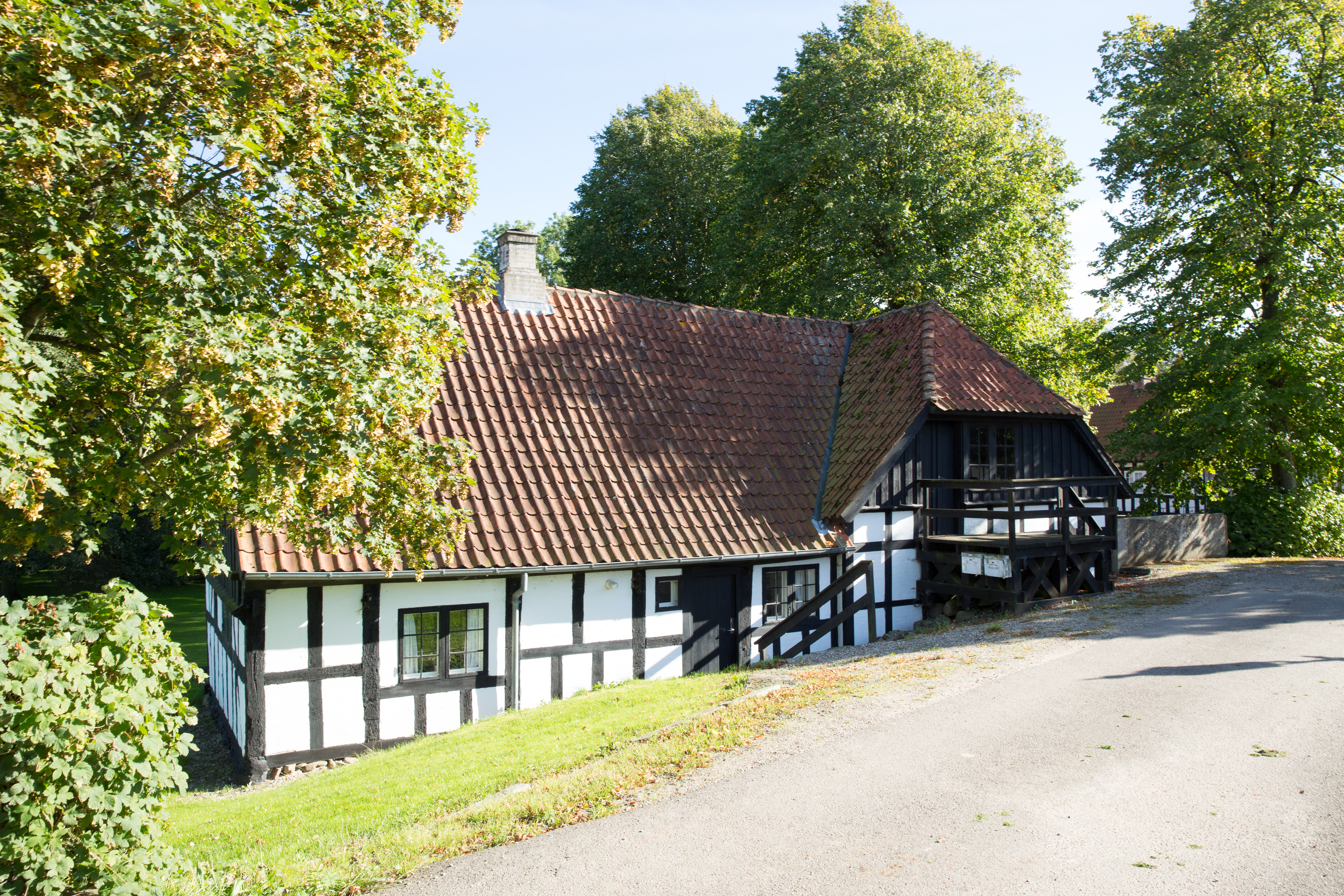
- Interactive map of the Tarskov Mill Farm area

General information
- Architectural style: Half-timbered
- Location: Aarhus Municipality, Denmark
- Completed: 1777; 249 years ago

Technical details
- Floor count: 1

Tarskov Mill Farm is a mill and a listed building in Aarhus Municipality, Denmark. The current mill was built in 1777 and was listed in the Danish registry of protected buildings and places by the Danish Heritage Agency on 10 October 1964. The buildings are today used for horse breeding, raising cattle and as a bed and breakfast.

The mill is placed on the Aarhus River north of Jeksendalen. The buildings can be traced back to the 1600s but is presumed to be older. The existing water mill was constructed in 1777 for milling grain. The mill no longer operates and the mill house is today empty. The water wheel was replaced by a 25 hk turbine in the 20th century but has since been removed again, leaving only the pond, water locks and grinders. The buildings are half-timbered and the roofs are shingled or thatched.

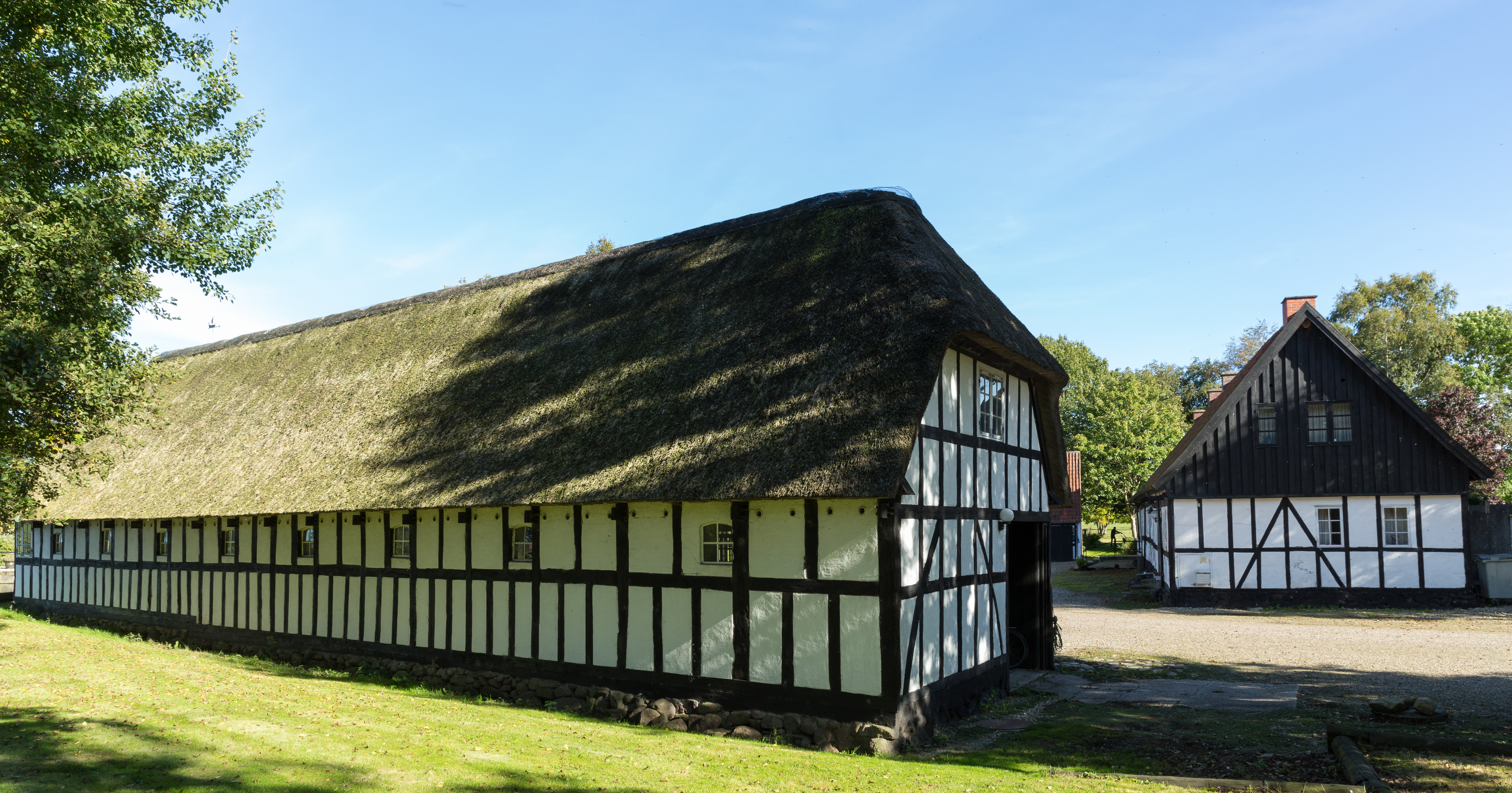
Stables

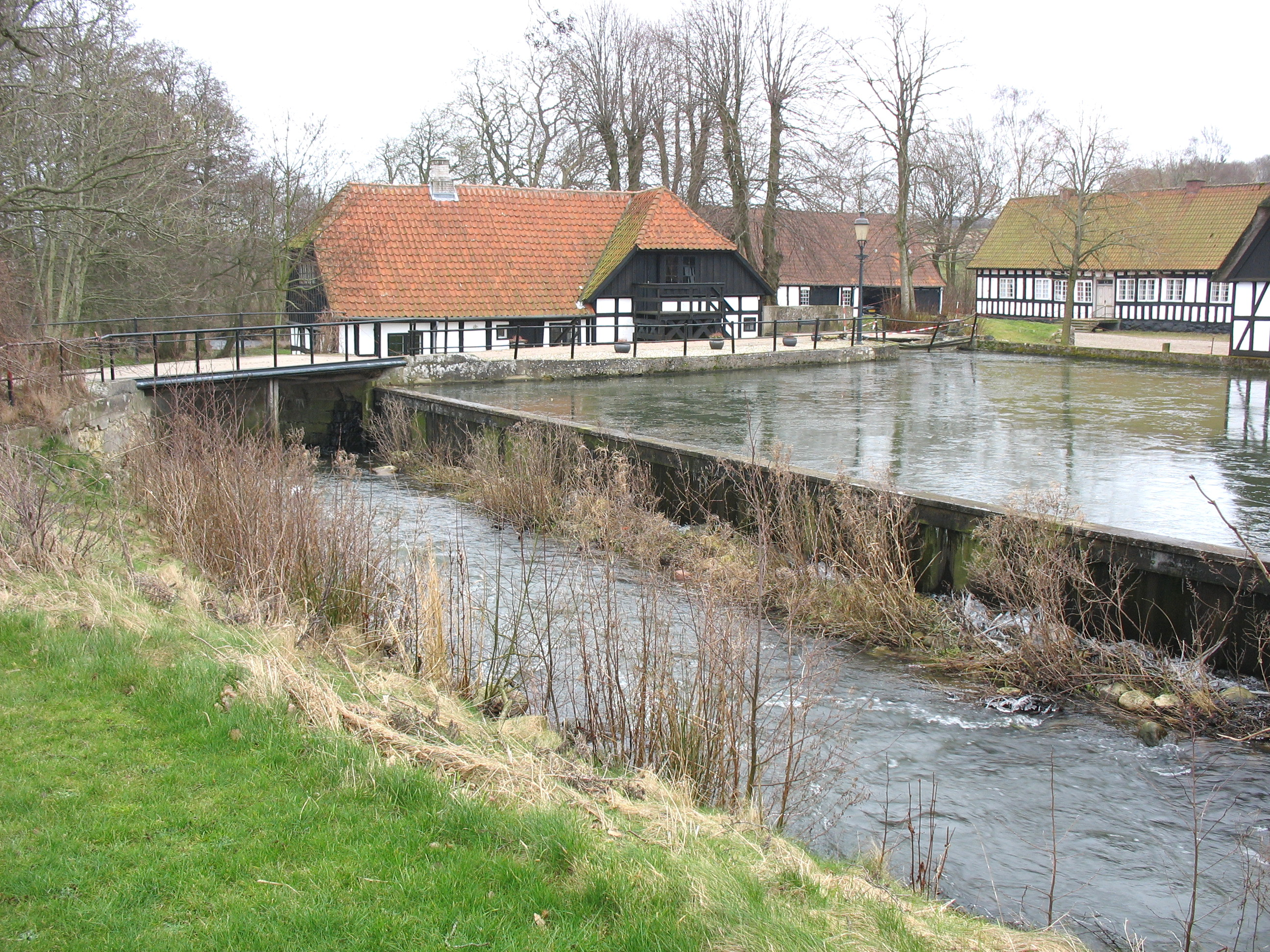
Mill

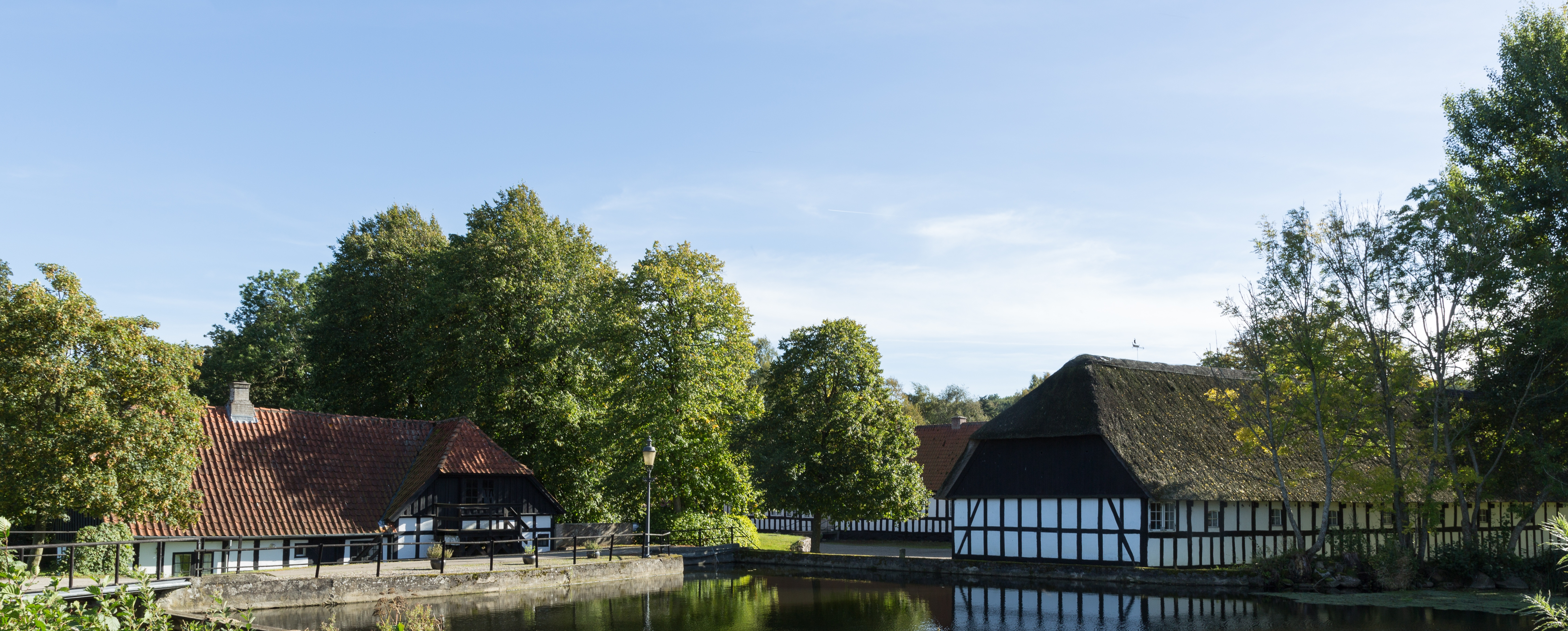
Mill and pond

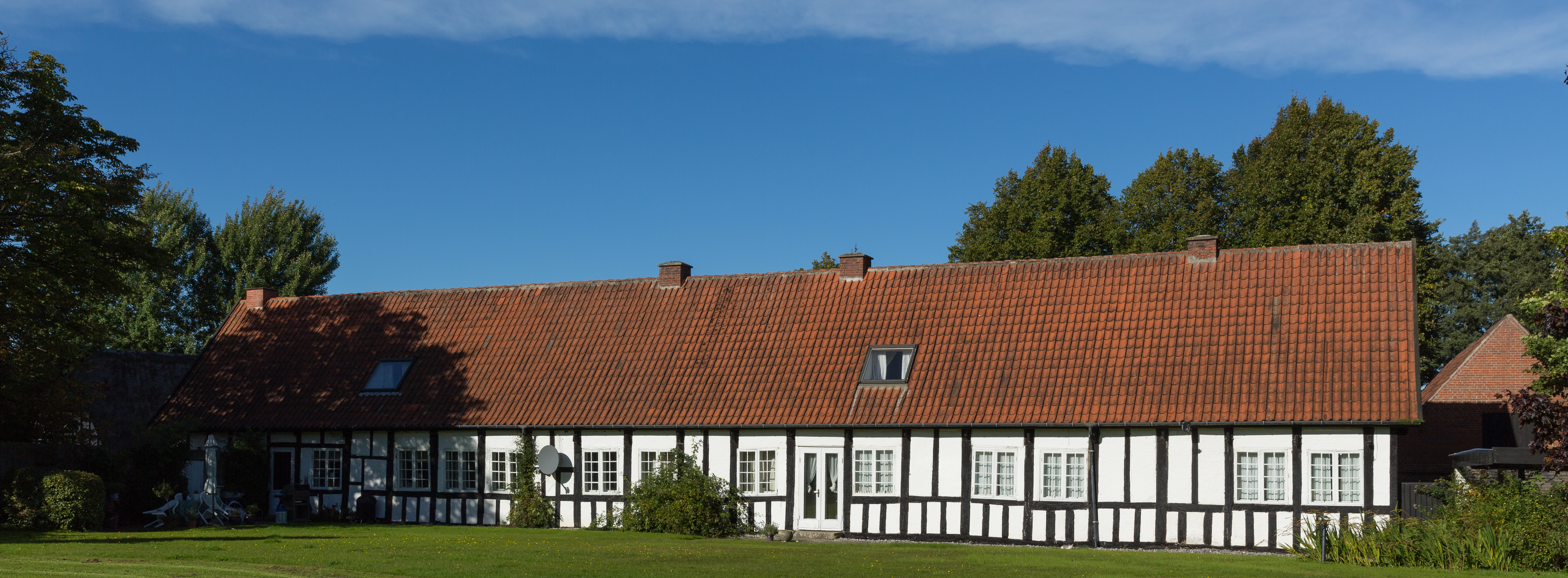
Main building

== See also ==
- Listed buildings in Aarhus Municipality
