= Hald's House =

Coordinates: 56.1580°N 10.2000°E

- Halds Gård or Rådmand Halds Gård
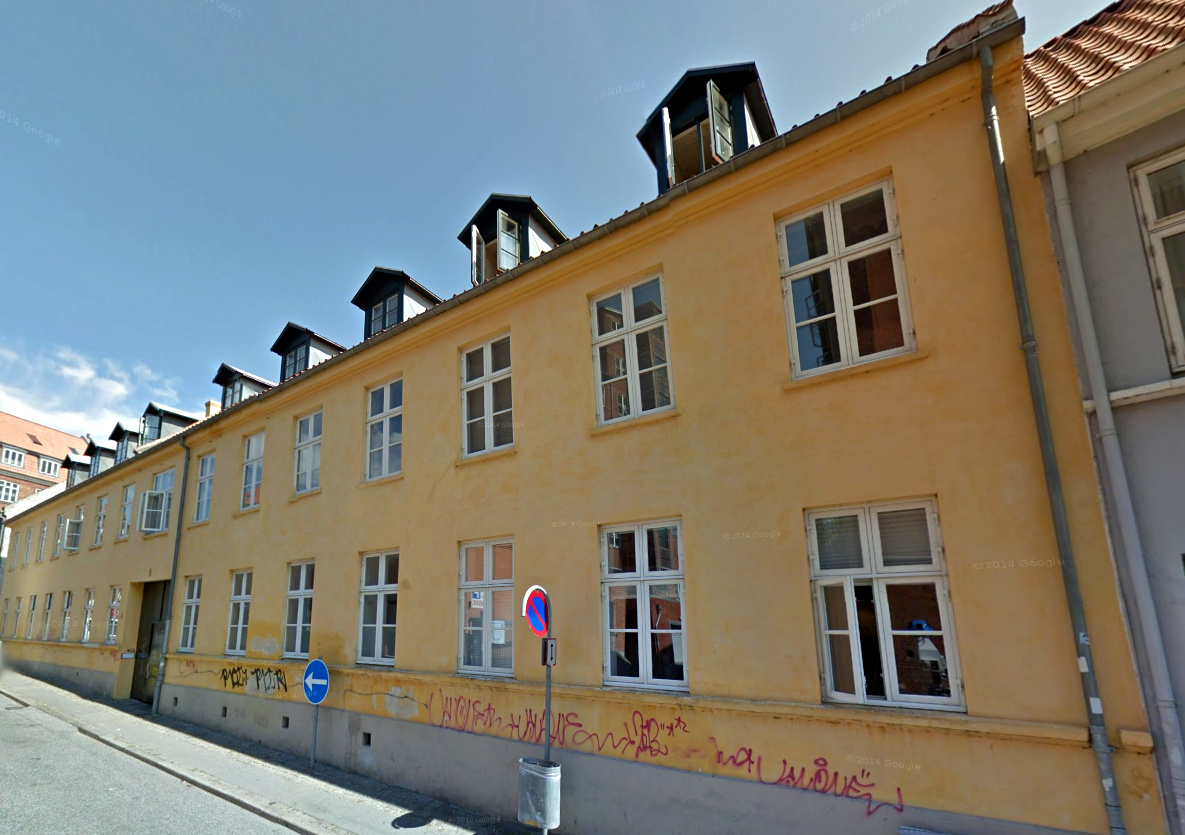
- Interactive map of the Hald's House area

General information
- Location: Aarhus, Denmark
- Construction started: 1848
- Completed: 1849

Technical details
- Floor count: 2
- Floor area: 2,038 m^{2} (21,940 sq ft)

Hald's House (Danish: Halds Gård) is a 4-winged house and a listed building in Aarhus, Denmark. The house was built in 1870 and was listed on the Danish registry of protected buildings and places by the Danish Heritage Agency on 7 October 1970. The house is situated in the central Indre by neighborhood on Vesterport.

== History ==
Hald's House was built by the merchant Jens Poulsen Hald in 1849. At the time Vesterport (Lit. Western Gate) had one of the 7 city gates at one end where Vestergade is now located. In the 1800s octroi was imposed on agricultural products entering the city and it was common for merchants to place their houses by the entrance of the city gates in order to receive farmers and trade with them. Hald was also a city council member why the house is also called Councillor Hald's House.

The building consists of 4 wings arranged in a square with a courtyard and smaller building in the middle. The front house facing the street was built by Hald but the back buildings were built earlier by other merchants. The front house replaced a half-timbered building that was constructed in the 1700s by Mogens Michelsen Blach who also built the north wing which was incorporated into the new building complex. The back house was built between 1817 and 1827 by merchant S. J. Schmidt and the low south-wing was built by Th. Fr. Severin in 1842.

In the latter part of the 19th century, the building was used as a small barracks which was common in the city at the time. The city built the larger Langelandsgade Barracks and Vester Allé Barracks in the 1880s and the buildings were sold off. In the years after it was used for small industry and shops. In the 1990s the buildings were renovated and turned into condominiums.

== Architecture ==
The house consists of 5 buildings from different time periods and a courtyard enclosed within. The front house has a low ridged roof with a series of prominent dormer windows and a brick cornice below.
