= Studsgade =

Street in Aarhus, Denmark

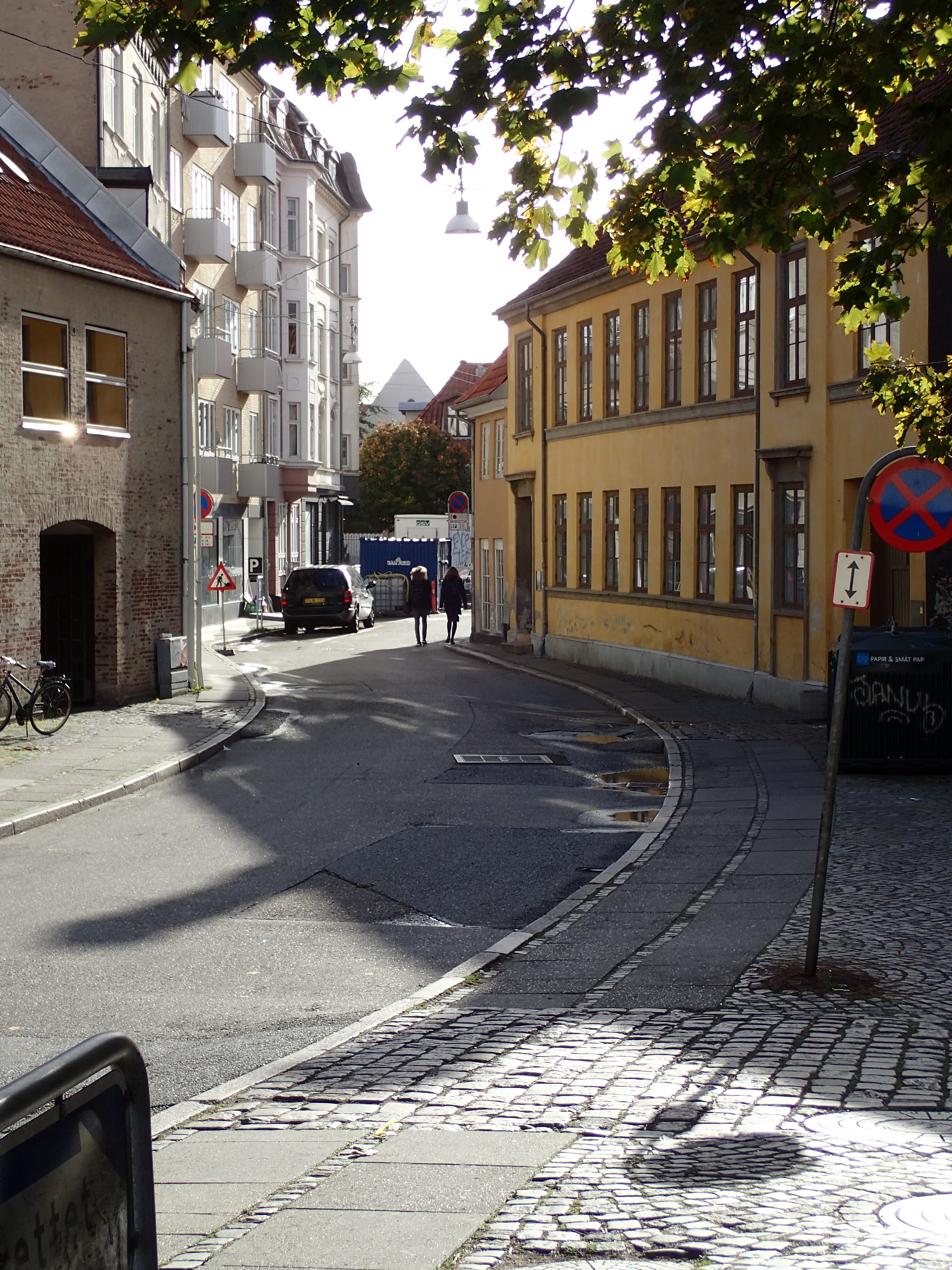
- Studsgade in Aarhus
- Interactive map of Studsgade
- Former name(s): Sturisgade, Stus Gaden
- Length: 275 m (902 ft)
- Location: Latin Quarter, Aarhus, Denmark
- Postal code: 8000
- Coordinates: 56°09′35.5″N 10°12′39.4″E

Studsgade is a street in Aarhus which runs north to south from Nørreport to Klostergade and Graven. The street is situated in the historic Latin Quarter neighborhood and is home to four listed buildings. The street has existed since at least the 1400s, when it was known as Sturisgade and Stus Gaden, probably for councillor Jep Sture, who had a house there. It was officially given its current name in 1796.

In the middle of Studsgade lies the small square Rykind from where the narrow alley Snævringen leads to Mejlgade.

== History ==
Studsgade was the northern inroad to the medieval town, and like other roads leading into the town, it was built on at an early time. In the 1400s, it was a street of significance. Mejlgade was established at a later time and became the thoroughfare for traffic from Grenå while Studsgade was turned in the direction of Randers, so it included the northern part of today's Nørreport.

Studsgade may have had a city gate in the direction of Grenå, but in the 1700s it had been moved to the site of the current Aarhus School of Architecture. In 1757, a new road was opened from Studsgade to Christiansbjerg in the north, which funneled a lot of traffic from Munkegade's Port to Studsgade. The increased traffic made Studsgade more useful for merchants, and several merchant's houses from that time can be found along the street today.

== Listed buildings ==
Studsgade contains four listed buildings from 1700, 1749, 1842 and 1847, situated side by side by Nørreport. Three of the buildings are half-timbered, and the fourth is a 3 winged brick structure that used to house a factory.

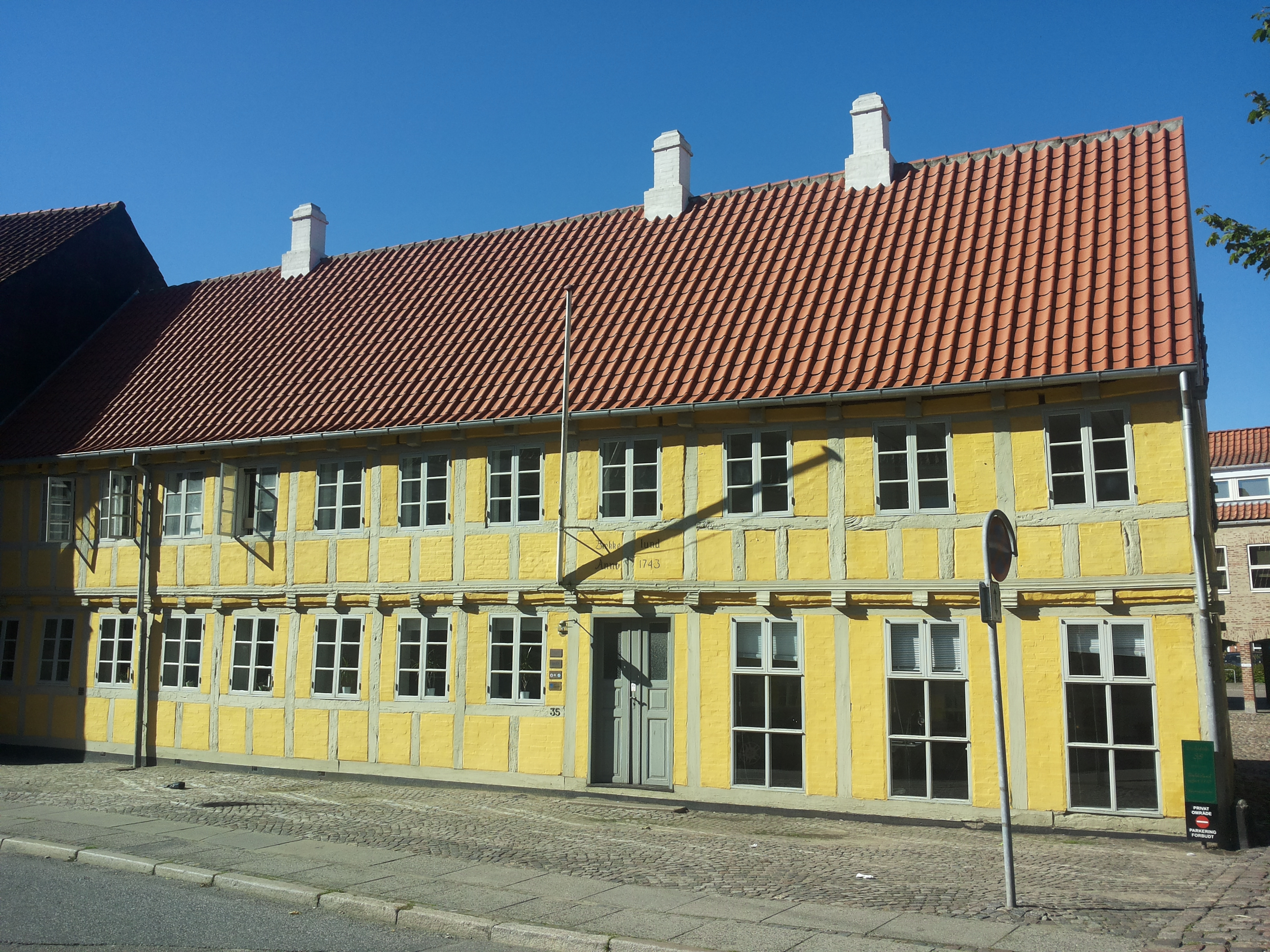
Studsgade 35, one of 4 listed buildings

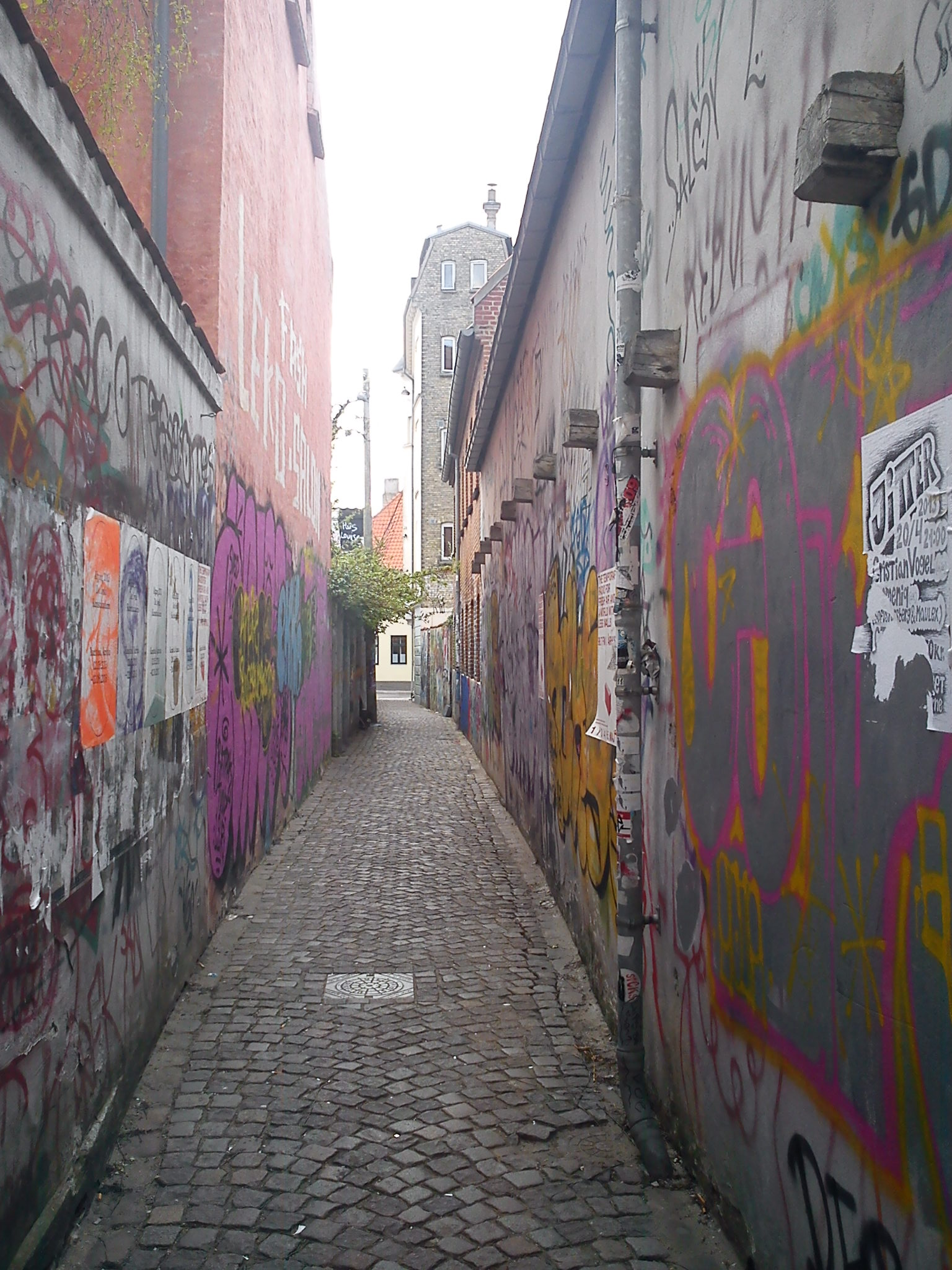
Snevringen
