= Aarhus Central Workshops =

Coordinates: 56.1498°N 10.2073°E

- Centralværkstederne
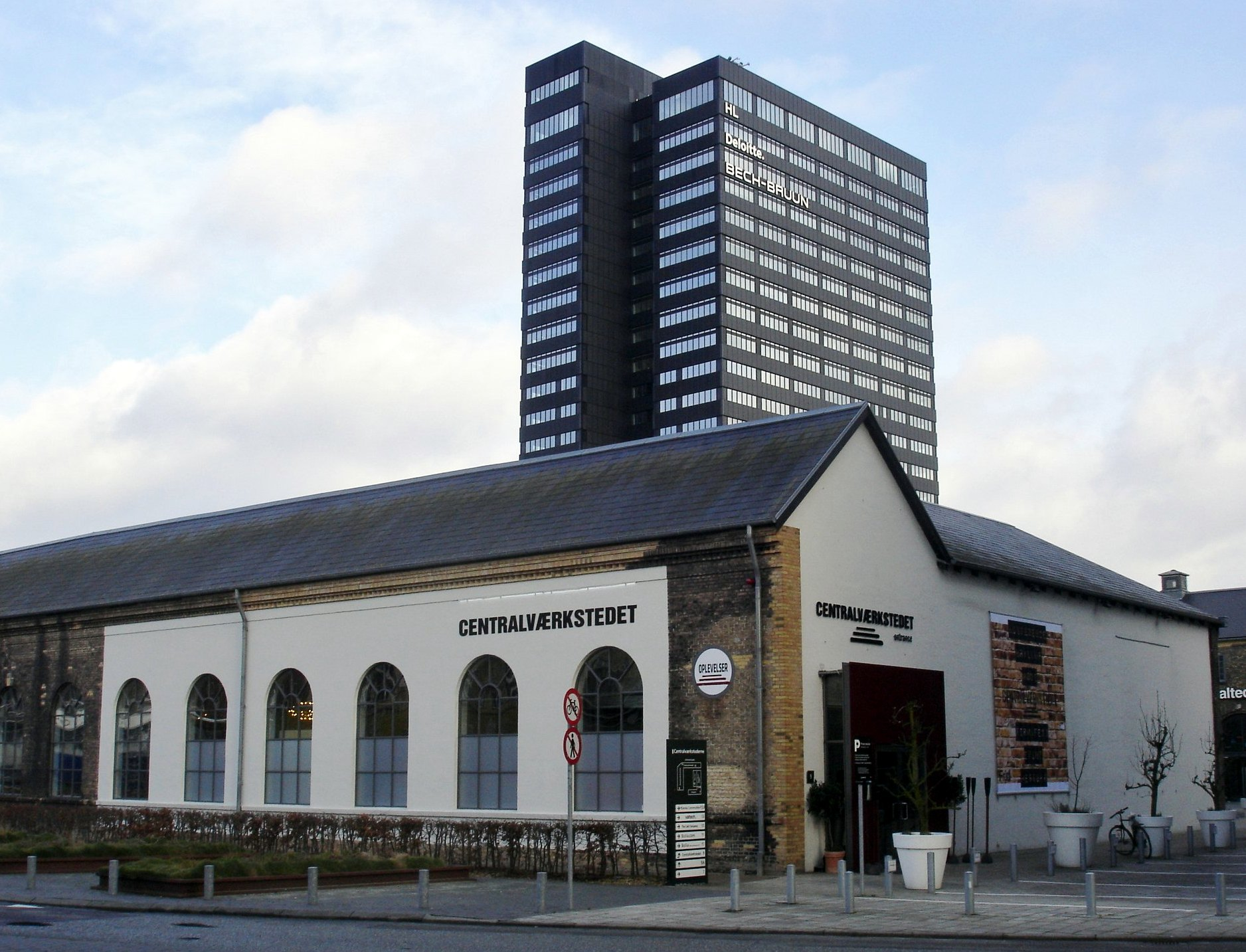
- Interactive map of the Aarhus Central Workshops area

General information
- Location: Aarhus, Denmark
- Completed: 1862

Technical details
- Floor count: 2

Website
- Centralværkstedet Website

The Aarhus Central Workshops (Danish: Centralværkstederne) is a complex of listed buildings in Aarhus, Denmark and is the former DSB central train repair facility for Jutland and Fuenen. The buildings were completed in 1862 and was listed by the Danish Heritage Agency in the Danish national registry of protected buildings and places on 11 November 2005. The complex includes the central workshop building (Danish: Centralværkstedet) and the smithy (Smedjen). The building complex is situated in the central Indre By neighborhood close to the Aarhus Central Station.

== History ==
The first rail line in Jutland was established between Aarhus and Randers and a rail workshop was built in AArhus in 1862. The rail line and the workshop was built and operated by the English company Peto, Brassey and Betts. The workshop was established on an area between the Central Station and Spanien in a 3-winged complex with offices, smithy and a number of specialized workshops.

During the war between Denmark and Germany in 1863–64 the workshop was closed down and in 1867 the Danish state took control of the Jutland-Fuenen railroads. In the decades after the war the railroad expanded greatly with ferry connections across Little Belt in 1872 and the Great Belt in 1883. In 1880 the state took control of the privately operated Zealand railroads and created the national Danish State Railroads or DSB. The workshop in Aarhus was named Centralværkstedet (English: Central Workshop) and became the primary workshop for train repair in Jutland and Fuenen.

In the 1930s DSB had 750 locomotives and trams and almost 15.000 cars, primarily for cargo. About half belonged to the central workshop in Aarhus which annually made some 7-8000 car repairs and 250 locomotive repairs. Beyond maintenance and repair the workshop did refurbishment and built most spare parts and specialized tools.

During the Second World War and the Occupation of Denmark in 1940–45 the Danish rail network suffered much damage and supply shortages meant old maintenance-heavy steam locomotives were taken back into service. The extraordinary need for repairs in the post-war years created a need for a lot of labor and the workshop was expanded. Over time the steam locomotives were gradually replaced by diesel trains and many regional rail lines were closed down so need for labor diminished again. In 1867 the workshop employed 100 men, in 1880 it had risen to 300, 750 in 1900, 1000 in 1920s and almost 1850 in 1949. After 1950 the number of employees fell steadily as work was gradually centralized in Copenhagen.

In 1990 only 140 employees remained and DSB decided to close the workshop and sell the 16.000 m2 property. The buildings has since been renovated and are used for shops and conferences.

== Architecture ==
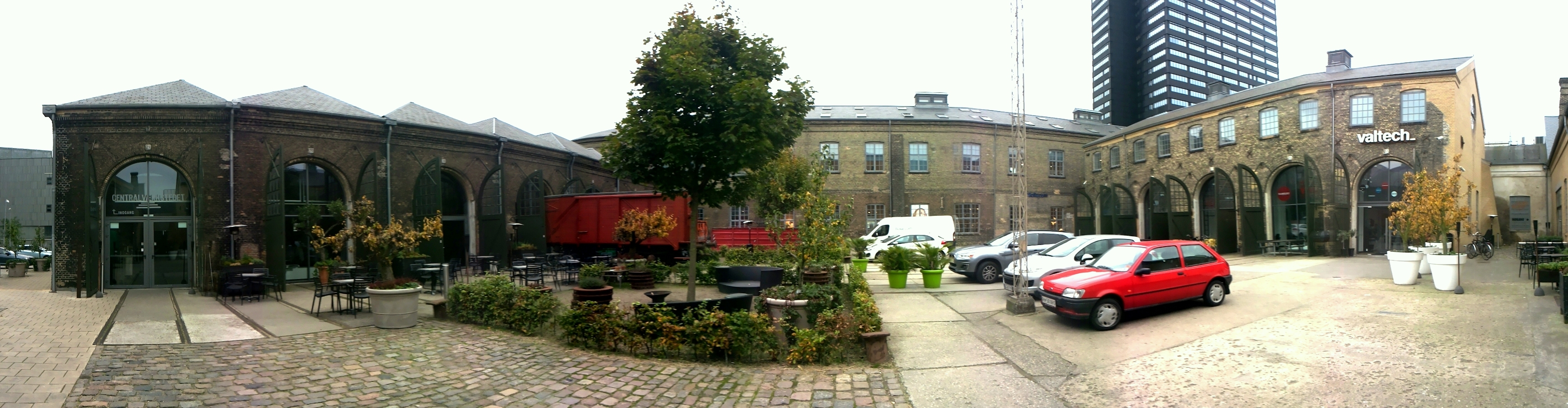
View of the inner courtyard made by the buildings Sibirien, the smithy and Centralværkstedet

The central workshops in Aarhus are the oldest train repair facilities in Denmark. The building complex has been extended and remodeled a number of times so it today illustrates the different industrial architectural styles from the 1860s to the mid-20th century.

The buildings can be roughly divided in 4 periods. 1860-70s when the rail lines to Struer (1863–65), Fredericia (1868), Silkeborg (1871) og Grenå (1877) was established. The smithy, Sibirien, Electrical Workshop and bogie Workshop are from this period. The car repair facility and paint shop is from around 1911. The car repair facility was expanded in 1930 and several of the existing buildings were remodeled. Finally, the large halls facing Spanien was built in 1940–59.

The complex has examples of simple 1 story brick buildings barely different from a traditional warehouse and the hall-building which has the first locomotive repair workshop, both from 1862. The brick hall-building Sibirien was constructed between 1870 and 1880 and features brick arches to carry cranes which makes it unique in from other contemporary hall-buildings. The bogie workshop from 1883 is a flat brick building with unique tilted windows in the flat roof. The car repair facility from 1911 and 1932 is a characteristic example of the concrete hall-buildings developed in the interwar period.

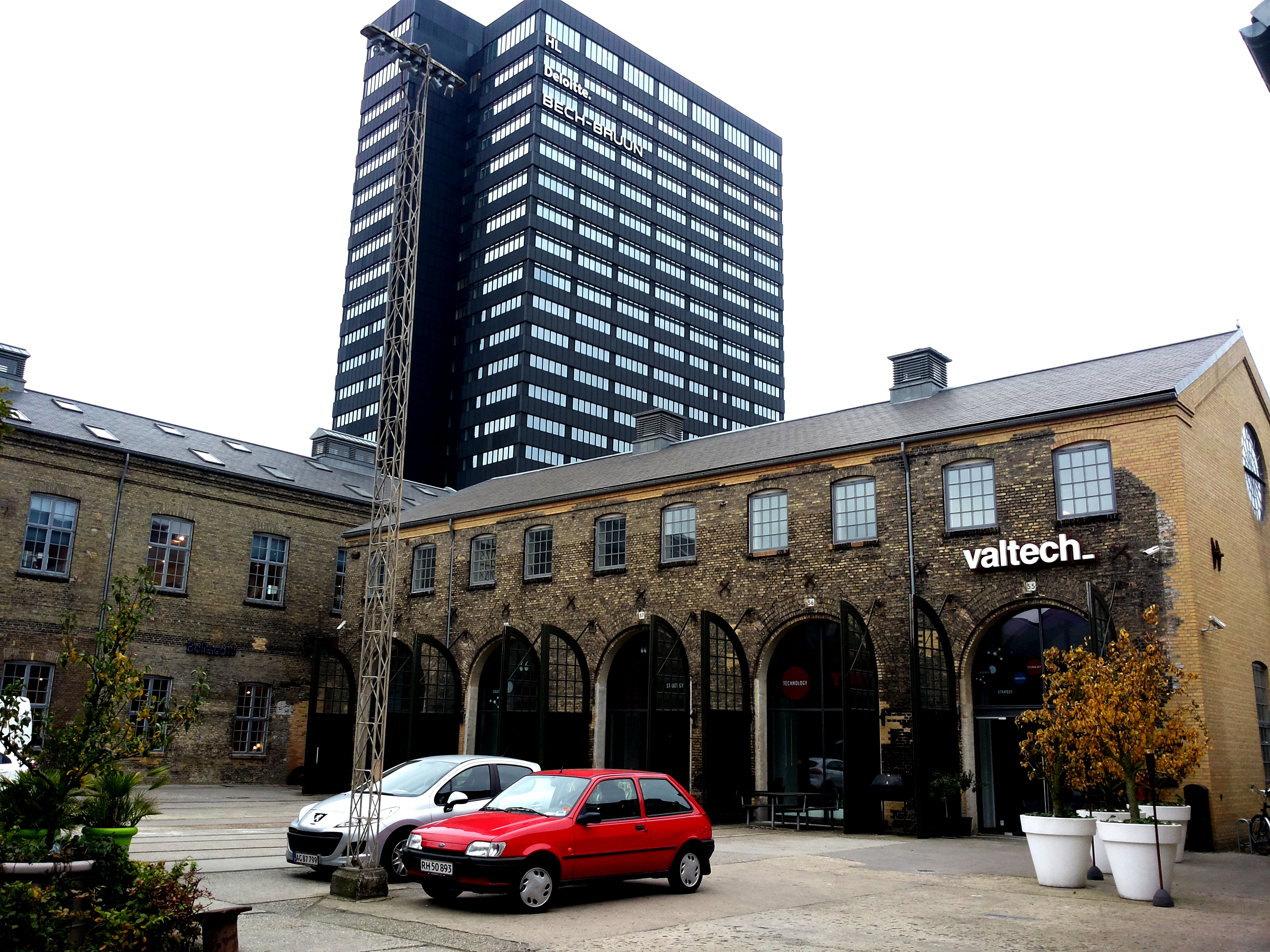

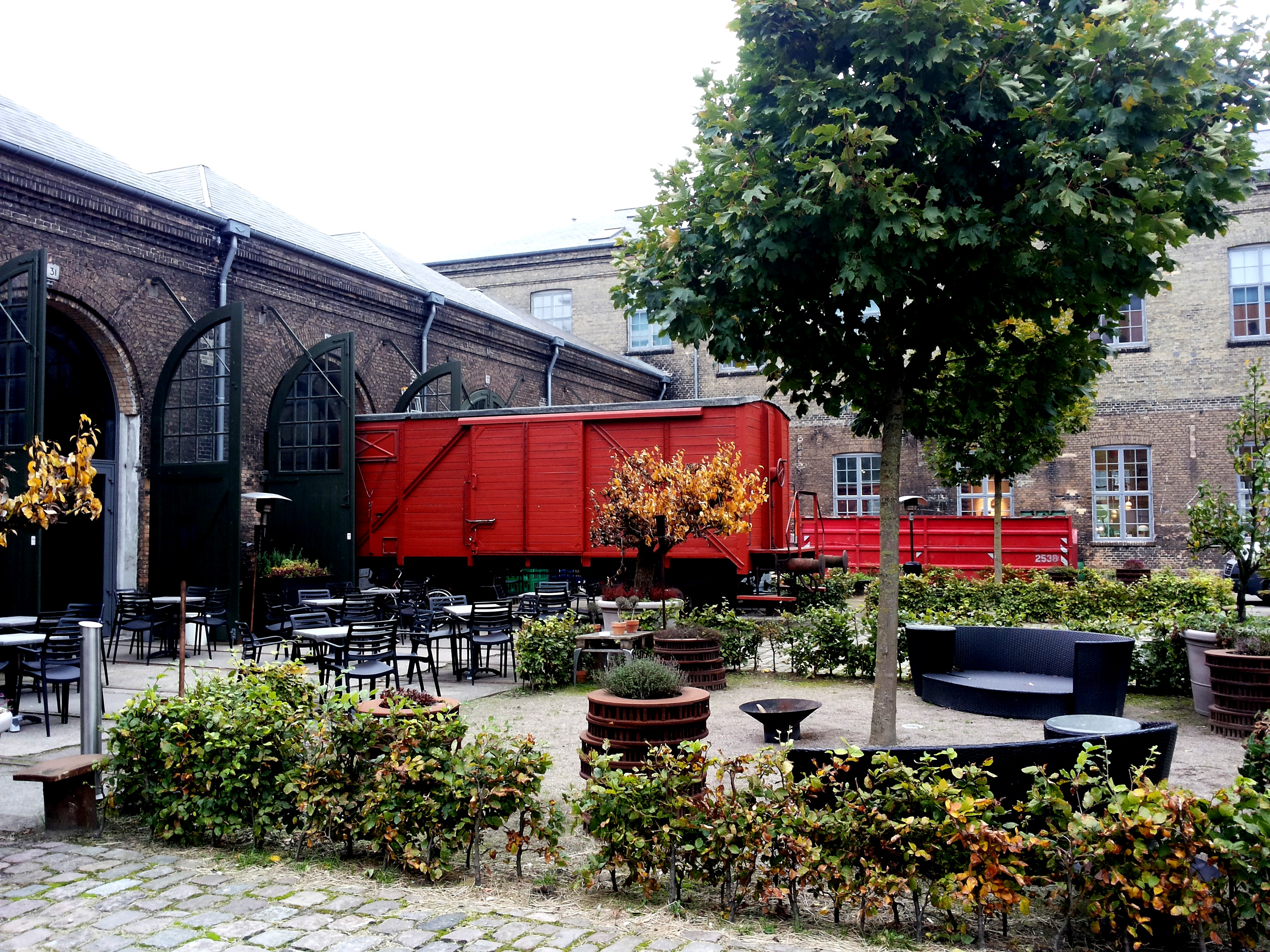

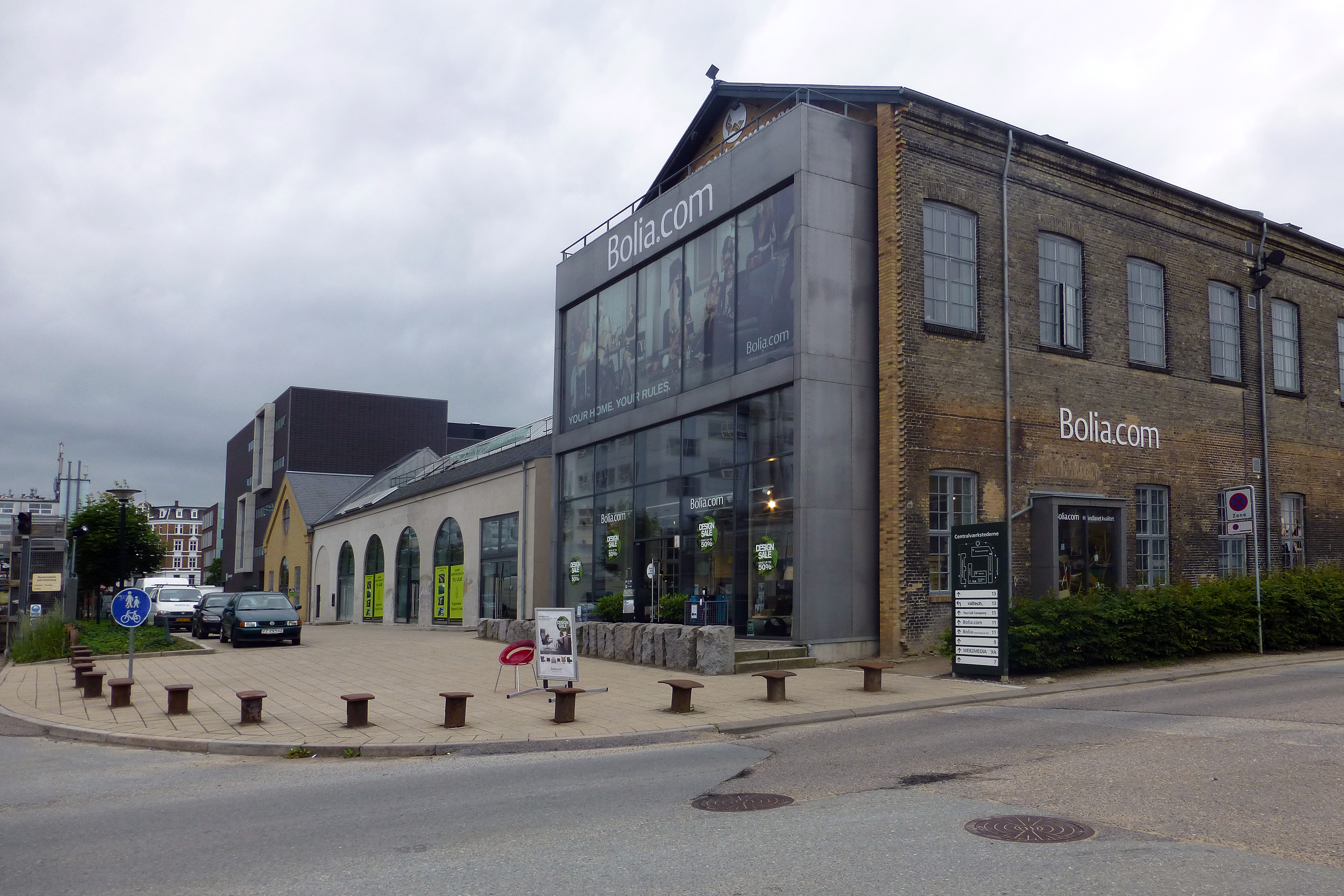

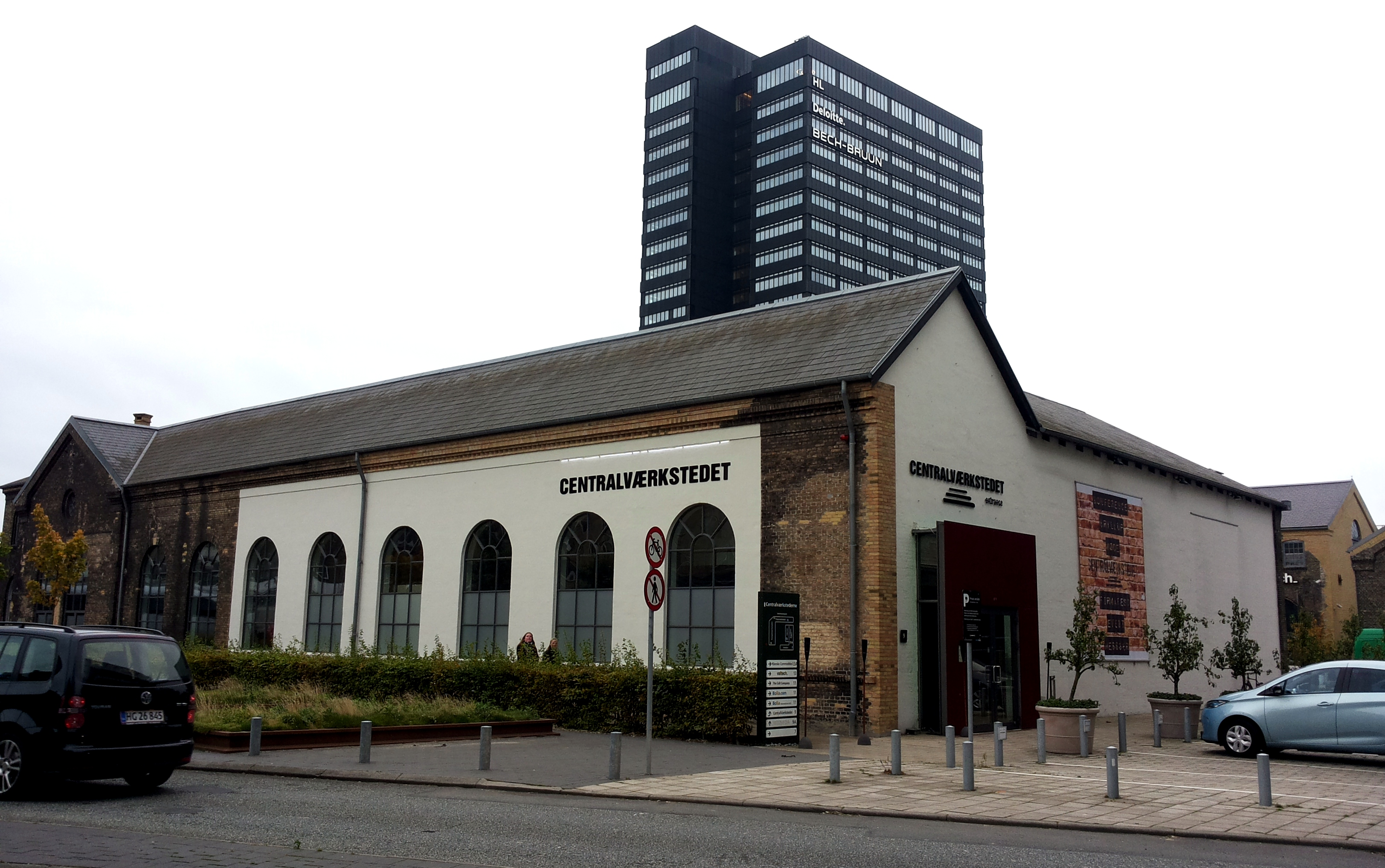
