= Hald House =

Building in Copenhagen Municipality, Denmark

Halrd House
- Halds Gård
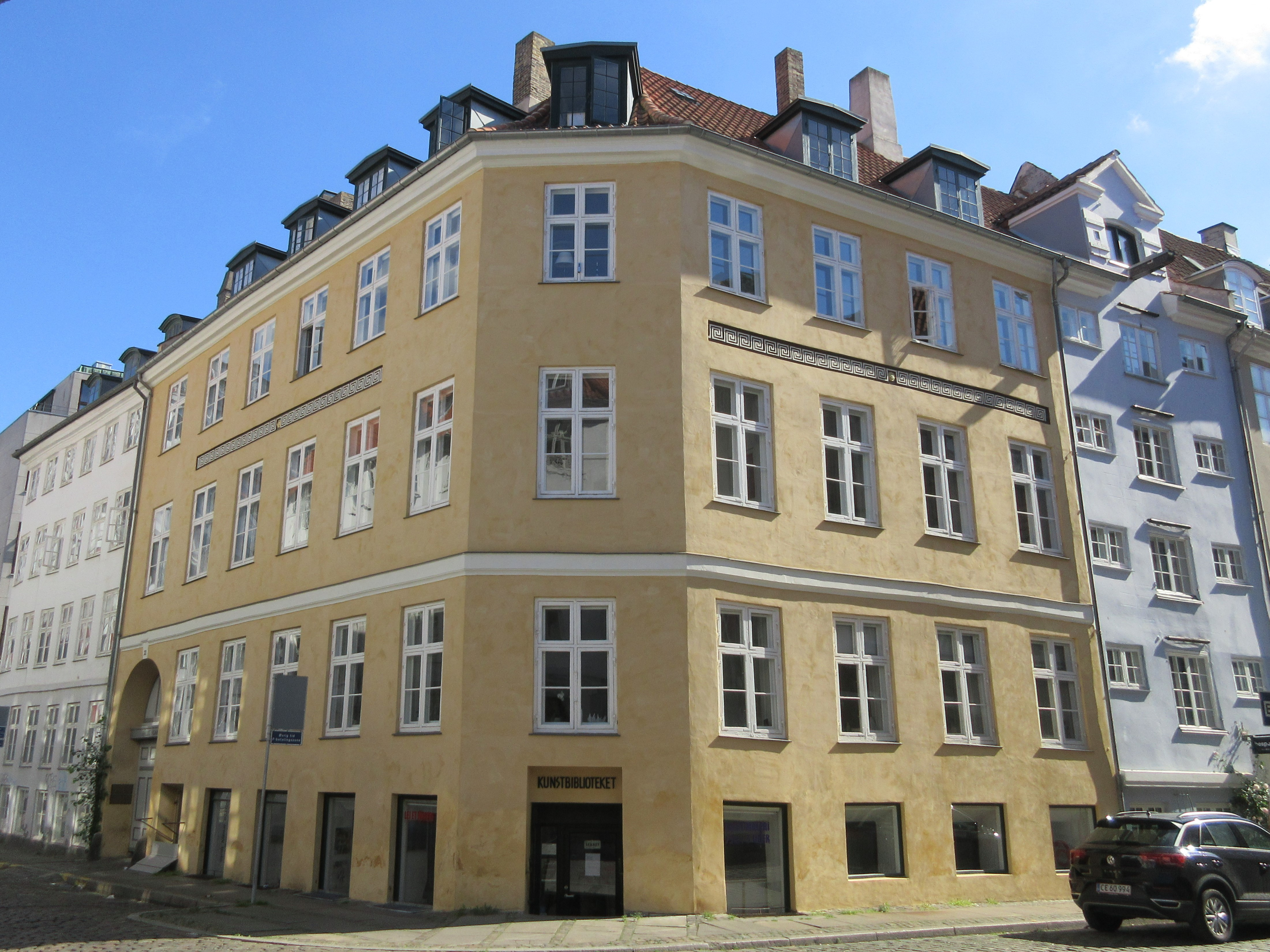
- Interactive map of the Halrd House area

General information
- Location: Copenhagen, Denmark
- Coordinates: 55°41′40.15″N 12°34′57.83″E
- Completed: 1799

The Hald House (Danish: Halds Gård) is a Neoclassical apartment building situated at the corner of Nikolajgade (No. 22) and Dybensgade in Copenhagen, Denmark. An adjacent warehouse 19 is also part of the property. The two buildings were constructed for a master baker in 1799 as part of the rebuilding on the city after the Copenhagen Fire of 1795. They were listed in the Danish registry of protected buildings and places in 1945. Notable former residents include ballet master August Bournonville and actor Dirch Passer.

== History ==
=== Site history, 1689–1809 ===
Prior to the Fire of 1795, the site was made up of two separate properties. The corner property was listed in Copenhagen's first cadastre from 1689 as No. 228 in Eastern Quarter, owned by Walter Heidemann.

The adjacent property in Dybensgade was listed as No. 227 in the Eastern Quarter (Øster Kvarter), owned by Margrete Wulff. She was the widow of Johan Wulf.

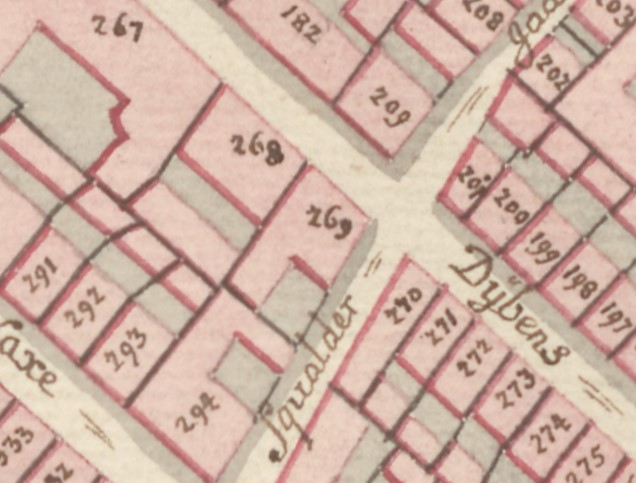
No. 268 and No. 269 seen in a detail from Christian Gedde's map of the East Quarter, 1757

The old No. 227 was listed in the new cadastre of 1756 as No. 268, owned by Hans Brandt. The old No. 228 was listed as No. 269, owned by wine merchant (vintapper) Henrik Jæger.

At the 1787 census, No. 268 was home to a single household. It consisted of the bookkeeper at Brown's sugar refinery Peder Roland, his wife Bolette Roland, six employees at the sugar refinery and a maid. No. 269 was also home to just one household. Jens Rosenberg, a man who dealt in Asiatic products, resided in the building with his wife Ane Margrethe, a maid and three lodgers.

=== Andreas Borup and the new building ===
The two properties were both destroyed in the Copenhagen Fire of 1795, together with most of the other buildings in the area. The two fire sites were subsequently merged into a single property. The present building on the site was constructed in 1799 for baker Andreas Frantzen Borup.

Borup's property was home to 26 residents in three households at the 1801 census. Borup resided in the building with his wife Anne Carlsen, their three children (aged two to nine), his sister Anne Borupm two maids, four bakers and a coachman. Johan Peder Grum, a royal port scribe (jgl havneskriver), resided in the building with his wife Johanne Dorthea Lindtrup, their six children (aged one to 11), one male servant and one maid. Mads Anker, an assistant in the Danish Asiatic Company, resided in the building with his wife Christine Brun and their two-year-old daughter.

In the new cadastre of 1806, Borup's property was listed as No. 188 in Raster Quarter.

Andreas Borup was the father of candlemaker Lars Borup. Lars' home, situated first in Store Kongensgade and then at the corner of Landemærket and Købmagergade, hosted Borups Selskab (Borup's Society), a theatrical society.

=== 1840–1900 ===
The ballet master August Bournonville (1805–1879) was a resident in the building from 1846 to 1848, and again in 1857.

=== 20th century ===
Around 1955, Nikolajgade 22 was acquired by lawyer Jacob Hald. The firm J. Halds Gaard A/S was founded on 23 April 1955.

The actor Dirch Passer (1923–1981) resided on the second floor in 1952–1953.

== Architecture ==
Nikolajgade 22 is a corner building constructed with three storeys over a walk-out basement. It has a six-bays-long facade on Nikolajgade, a four-bays-long facade on Dybensgade and a chamfered corner. The chamfered corner bay was dictated for all corner buildings by Jørgen Henrich Rawert's and Peter Meyn's guidelines for the rebuilding of the city after the fire, so that the fire department's long ladder companies could navigate the streets more easily.

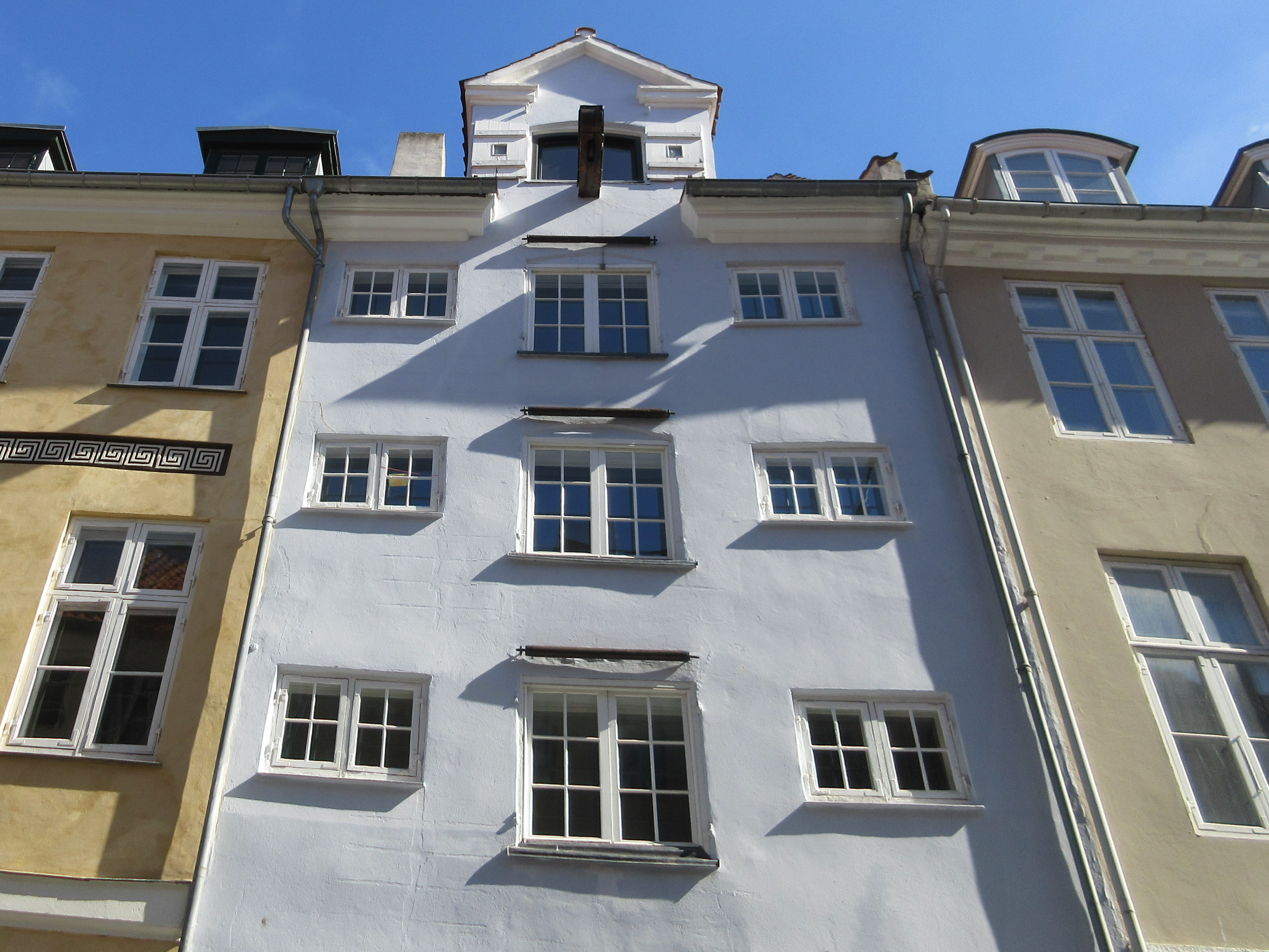
Dybensgade 19

The adjacent warehouse at Dubensgade 19 is just three bays wide. Its facade is crowned by a gabled wall dormer with the remains of a pulley.

== Today ==
The property is owned by J. Halds Gård A/S. The law firms Peter Tetens Hald and HaldHuttenberg are both based in the building. Kunstbiblioteket, a firm letting out artworks by recognized artists, is also based in the building.
