= Pauline Hald =

American biochemist

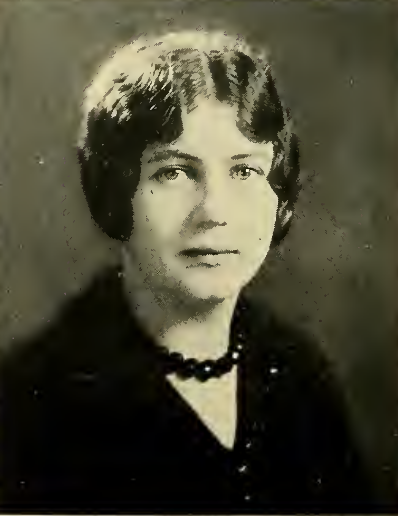
- Pauline Hald, from the 1926 yearbook of Wellesley College
- Born: February 2, 1904; New Haven, Connecticut, United States
- Died: December 5, 1998 (aged 94); New Haven, Connecticut, United States
- Occupations: Scientist, medical researcher

Pauline Merritt Hald (February 2, 1904 – December 5, 1998) was an American clinical chemist and medical researcher, based in New Haven, Connecticut. She worked in the laboratory of chemist John P. Peters for many years, and published the first description of his flame photometry technique for measuring serum sodium and potassium levels.

== Early life and education ==
Hald was born in New Haven, Connecticut, the daughter of Frank Xavier Hald and Josephine Merritt Hald. Her parents were immigrants; her father was born in Germany, and her mother was born in Nova Scotia. She graduated from Wellesley College in 1926.

== Career ==
Hald worked as a biochemist based in New Haven. starting in the laboratory of John P. Peters at Yale School of Medicine. She was the first person to describe Peters' flame photometry technique for measuring sodium and potassium concentrations in blood samples. She was later director of the clinical chemistry laboratory at Grace-New Haven Hospital. In 1953 she addressed the Connecticut Society of Medical Technologists as a guest speaker. In 1957 she was one of the founding officers of the Connecticut section of the American Association for Clinical Chemistry.

Hald also worked at her family's moving and storage business, and volunteered for Catholic women's charities in New Haven. She was president of the New Haven Wellesley Club, and a member of the city's Soroptimist Club.

== Publications ==
From the 1930s to the 1960s, Hald's research was published in academic journals including Journal of Clinical Investigation, Journal of Biological Chemistry,American Journal of Physiology, and Methods in Medical Research. She also contributed to the textbook Standard Methods of Clinical Chemistry (1963).

- "The plasma proteins in relation to blood hydration. VI. Serum proteins in nephritic edema" (1931, with John P. Peters, Frederick S. Bruckman, Anna J. Eisenman, and A. Maurice Wakeman)
- "The nature of diabetic acidosis" (1933, with John P. Peters, David M. Kydd, and Anna J. Eisenman)
- "The determination of the bases of serum and whole blood" (1933)
- "Osmotic adjustments between cells and serum in the circulating blood of man." Journal of Biological Chemistry (1937, with Anna J. Eisenman and John P. Peters)
- "The importance of removing phosphorus in the determination of serum sodium" (1939)
- "The state of the inorganic components of human red blood cells" (1940, with Rebecca Z. Solomon and John P. Peters)
- "Factors that influence the passage of ascorbic acid from serum to cells in human blood" (1940, with Martin Heinemann)
- "Notes on the determination and distribution of sodium and potassium in cells and serum of normal human blood" (1946)
- "The flame photometer for the measurement of sodium and potassium in biological materials" (1946)
- "Sodium, potassium and phosphates in the cells and serum of blood in diabetic acidosis" (1947, with Thaddeus S. Danowski and John P. Peters)
- "The distribution of sodium and potassium in oxygenated human blood and their effects upon the movements of water befween cells and plasma" (1947, with Maurice Tulin, Thaddeus S. Danowski, Paul H. Lavietes, and John P. Peters)
- "Determinations with flame photometry" (1951)
- "The displacement of serum water by the lipids of hyperlipemic serum. A new method for the rapid determination of serum water" (1955, with Margaret J. Albrink, Evelyn B. Man, and John P. Peters)
- "Sodium and potassium by flame photometry" (1958, with W. Burkett Mason)
- "Uric Acid" (1963, with Wendell T. Caraway)
- "Free Amino Acids in Plasma and Urine by the Gasometric Ninhydrin-Carbon Dioxide Method^{"} (1963, with Elizabeth G. Frame, Neil Y. Chiamori, and Ethel Conger)

== Personal life ==
Hald lived with her younger brother Walter for most of her life. She died in 1998, aged 94 years, in New Haven.
