= Listed buildings in Aarhus Municipality =

This is a list of listed buildings in Aarhus Municipality, Denmark.

Listing name	Image	Location	Year built	Ref
Astrup Præstegård		Østergårdsvej 223; 8355 Solbjerg; 56°02′00.1″N 10°06′16.8″E	1770	Reference
Badstuegade 1H		Badstuegade 1H; 8000 Aarhus C 56°09′29.5″N 10°12′27.9″E	1809	Reference
Centralværkstederne		Værkmestergade 7; 8000 Aarhus C 56°08′58.8″N 10°12′27.9″E	1862	Reference
Centralværkstederne, administrationsbygning m.m.		Jægergårdsgade 97; 8000 Aarhus C 56°08′55.0″N 10°12′20.0″E	1910	Reference
Den Grå Kannikegård		Store Torv 3; 8000 Aarhus C 56°09′25.3″N 10°12′31.9″E	Medieval times	Reference
Det Norske Hus		Vestre Skovvej 002; 8240 Risskov; 56°10′55.6″N 10°13′34.4″E	1888	Reference
Domkirkepladsen 1		Domkirkepladsen 1; 8000 Aarhus C 56°09′26.7″N 10°12′37.9″E	1926	Reference
Erhvervsarkivet		Vester Allé 012; 8000 Aarhus C 56°09′16.8″N 10°12′01.1″E	1902	Reference
Hans Broges Gård		Mindegade 8; 8000 Aarhus C 56°09′13.6″N 10°12′39.7″E	1850	Reference
Harlev Præstegård		Harlev Kirkevej 11; 8462 Harlev J 56°07′56.9″N 10°00′38.5″E	1737	Reference
Højen 13		Højen 13; 8220 Brabrand; 56°09′25.9″N 10°06′41.2″E	1958	Reference
Jarlsminde		Søskrænten 4; 8260 Viby J 56°07′58.1″N 10°07′39.3″E	1798	Reference
Juuls Gaard		Mejlgade 19; 8000 Aarhus C 56°09′27.8″N 10°12′24.9″E	1625	Reference
Jysk Handels- og Landbrugsbank		Lille Torv 006; 8000 Aarhus C 56°09′27.9″N 10°12′24.8″E	1899	Reference
Klintegaarden		Skovvejen 44–46; 8000 Aarhus C 56°09′54.9″N 10°13′03.5″E	1896	Reference
Klostergade 56		Klostergade 56; 8000 Aarhus C 56°09′31.9″N 10°12′18.3″E	1812	Reference
Klostergade 58		Klostergade 58; 8000 Aarhus C 56°09′32.0″N 10°12′17.2″E	1700s	Reference
Kærbygård		Kærbyvej 9, 11 og 13; 8200 Aarhus; 56°12′39.8″N 10°07′45.9″E	1768	Reference
Købmand Herskinds Gård		Frederiksgade 79; 8000 Aarhus C 56°09′13.4″N 10°12′11.7″E	1816	Reference
Lyngbygård		Lyngbygårdsvej 25; 8220 Brabrand; 56°10′12.2″N 10°01′42.0″E	1755	Reference
Mejlen		Hans Hartvig Seedorffs Stræde 12; 8000 Aarhus C 56°09′13.0″N 10°12′15.5″E	1883	Reference
Mejlgade 7		Mejlgade 7; 8000 Aarhus C 56°09′28.1″N 10°12′42.5″E	1848	Reference
Mejlgade 25		Mejlgade 25; 8000 Aarhus C 56°09′30.7″N 10°12′43.2″E	1585	Reference
Mejlgade 43		Mejlgade 43; 8000 Aarhus C 56°09′33.9″N 10°12′44.8″E	1831	Reference
Mejlgade 45		Mejlgade 45; 8000 Aarhus C 56°09′34.2″N 10°12′44.6″E	1842	Reference
Mejlgade 48		Mejlgade 48; 8000 Aarhus C 56°09′34.8″N 10°12′45.9″E	1864	Reference
Mejlgade 52–54		Mejlgade 52–54; 8000 Aarhus C 56°09′36.1″N 10°12′47.1″E	1837	Reference
Moesgård		Moesgård Allé 18–20; 8270 Højbjerg; 56°05′07.2″N 10°13′11.7″E	1780	Reference
Moesgård Skovmølle		Skovmøllevej 51, 53; 8270 Højbjerg; 56°05′04.1″N 10°14′07.2″E	b. 1785	Reference
Mønsteds Gård		Vestergade 11; 8000 Aarhus C 56°09′27.3″N 10°12′18.3″E	1811	Reference
Ole Rømer Observatory		Observatorievejen 1, 3; 8000 Aarhus; 56°07′39.8″N 10°11′35.6″E	1910	Reference
Psykiatrisk Hospital		Skovagervej 2; 8240 Risskov; 56°11′09.8″N 10°13′45.3″E	1852	Reference
Raae's Gård		Nørreport 20; 8000 Aarhus C 56°09′40.4″N 10°12′44.9″E	1798	Reference
Rosensgade 38A-B		Rosensgade 38 A-B; 8000 Aarhus C 56°09′29.0″N 10°12′30.8″E	1600	Reference
Rådmand Halds Gård		Vesterport 8 B 8000 Aarhus C 56°09′29.0″N 10°11′59.5″E	1870	Reference
Skolegade 15–17		Skolegade 15–17; 8000 Aarhus C 56°09′21.6″N 10°12′41.2″E	1577	Reference
Skolegade 19		Skolegade 19; 8000 Aarhus C 56°09′20.1″N 10°12′41.2″E	1802	Reference
Studsgade 29		Studsgade 29; 8000 Aarhus C 56°09′36.2″N 10°12′40.4″E	1700	Reference
Studsgade 31		Studsgade 31; 8000 Aarhus C 56°09′36.7″N 10°12′41.2″E	1842	Reference
Studsgade 33		Studsgade 33; 8000 Aarhus C 56°09′37.3″N 10°12′41.9″E	1900	Reference
Studsgade 35		Studsgade 35; 8000 Aarhus C 56°09′38.1″N 10°12′42.4″E	1749	Reference
Stykgodspakhuset		Nordhavnsgade 4; 8000 Aarhus C 56°09′17.2″N 10°12′47.6″E	1925	Reference
Tarskov Møllegård		Tarskovvej 1; 8462 Harlev; 56°07′27.4″N 10°00′13.8″E	1777	Reference
Thoralds Hus		Gedingvej 2; 8381 Tilst; 56°11′36.4″N 10°06′40.2″E	1700s	Reference
Toldkammeret		Havnen 165; 8000 Aarhus C 56°09′20.4″N 10°12′47.9″E	1895	Reference
Trods Katholm		Mindegade 4, Fredens Torv 1, 3 B 8000 Aarhus C 56°09′14.0″N 10°12′39.9″E	1847	Reference
Vester Allés Kaserne		Vester Allé 1; 8000 Aarhus C 56°09′12.7″N 10°12′03.5″E	1860	Reference
Vestergade 1		Vestergade 1; 8000 Aarhus C 56°09′27.2″N 10°12′24.0″E	1540	Reference
Vestergade 29		Vestergade 29; 8000 Aarhus C 56°09′27.0″N 10°12′09.4″E	1827	Reference
Vestergade 58		Vestergade 58; 8000 Aarhus C 56°09′27.2″N 10°12′03.2″E	1761	Reference
Vilhelmsborg		Bedervej 101, Vilhelmsborg Allé 1, Vilhelmsborgvej 4–12; 8320 Mårslet; 56°04′00.8″N 10°11′12.5″E	1842	Reference
Villa Kampen		Strandvejen 104; 8000 Aarhus C 56°08′08.3″N 10°12′28.1″E	1902	Reference
Vor Frue Kloster		Klostergade 59; 8000 Aarhus C 56°09′30.2″N 10°12′18.2″E	1878	Reference
Århus Håndværkerforenings Asyl		Paradisgade 5–7; 8000 Aarhus C 56°09′36.2″N 10°12′34.7″E	1866	Reference
Århus Katedralskole		Skolegyde 1–3; 8000 Aarhus C 56°09′23.8″N 10°12′42.9″E	1904	Reference
Århus Kommunale Svømmehal og Badeanstalt		Spanien 3–7; 8000 Aarhus C 56°09′06.2″N 10°12′39.5″E	1933	Reference
Århus Rådhus		Rådhuspladsen 2, Park Alle 2; 8000 Aarhus C 56°09′08.6″N 10°12′11.1″E	1942	Reference
Århus Rådhus (tidl.)		Domkirkepladsen 5; 8000 Aarhus C 56°09′25.9″N 10°12′41.0″E	1857	Reference
Århus Statsgymnasium		Fenrisvej 31; 8210 Aarhus; 56°09′40.3″N 10°10′14.0″E	1958	Reference
Århus Teater		Kannikegade 1–3; 8000 Aarhus C 56°09′21.8″N 10°12′39.2″E	1900	Reference
