= Agency for Culture and Palaces (Denmark) =

Danish Ministry of Culture agency

Coordinates: 55°40′40.71″N 12°33′52.94″E

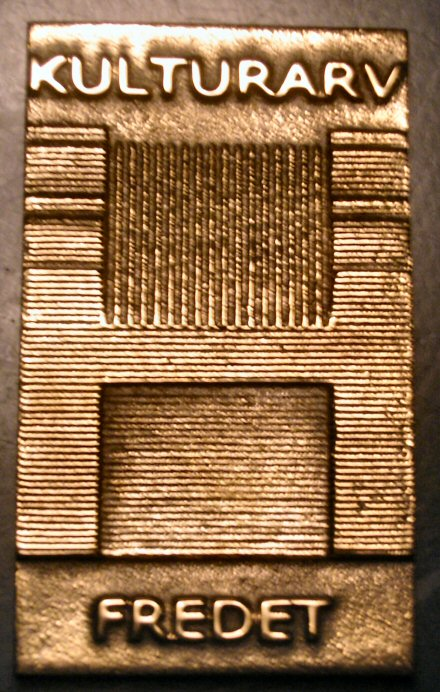
Plate used to mark listed buildings in Denmark. It reads "Cultural Heritage" and "Protected".

The Danish Agency for Culture and Palaces (Danish: Slots- og Kulturstyrelsen) is an agency under the aegis of the Danish Ministry of Culture. The agency carries out the cultural policies of the Danish government within the visual and performing arts, music, literature, museums, historical and cultural heritage, broadcasting, libraries and all types of printed and electronic media. It works internationally in all fields, and increased internationalisation of Danish arts and cultural life is a top priority. The Danish Agency for Culture was founded on 1 January 2002 when the Danish Heritage Agency, the Danish Arts Agency and the Danish Agency for Libraries and Media merged. The Danish Agency for Culture and Palaces was founded on 1 January 2016 by a fusion of the Danish Agency for Culture and the Danish agency Styrelsen for Slotte & Kulturejendomme.

== Responsibilities ==
=== Sites and monuments ===
Ancient sites and monuments include burial mounds, rock carvings, runic stones, road tracks, military fortifications, castles, ruins, etc. Underwater sites, including shipwrecks more than a hundred years old, are also covered. Construction sites often reveal ancient settlements and burial finds. Many towns have cultural layers from Medieval times to the present.

All sites and monuments are protected from destruction under the Danish Museum Act which is administered by the Heritage Agency.

The Heritage Agency does not own any sites and monuments itself, though it manages the restoration of selected megalithic tombs and Medieval ruins. To the extent that the State owns listed buildings, they are owned and administrated by the Palaces and Properties Agency.

=== Listed buildings ===
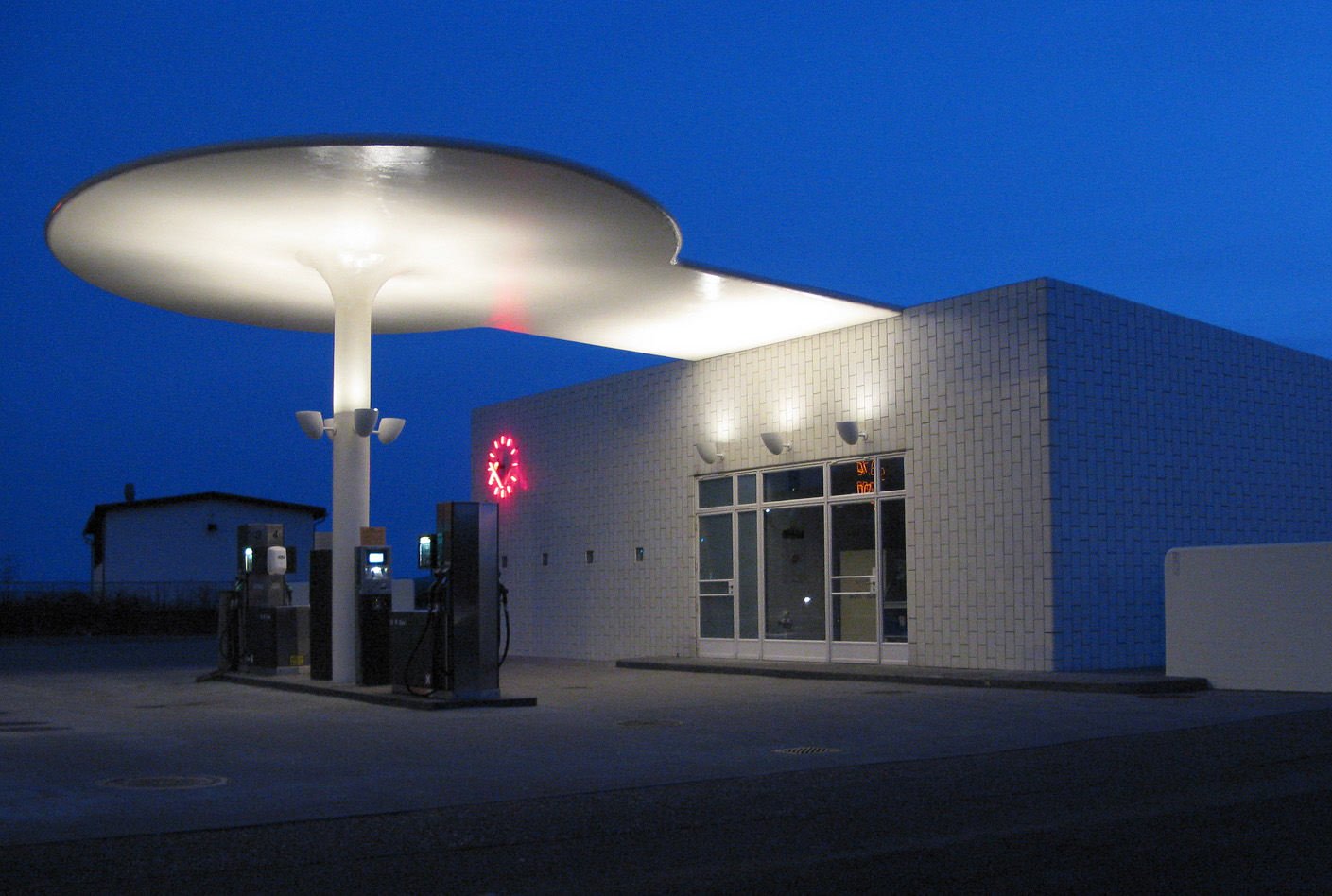
The still operating Skovshoved Filling Station, class A listed

There are more than 9,000 listed buildings in Denmark while another 300,000 have been deemed "worthy of preservation". The Heritage Agency is responsible for listed buildings, while the local authorities are responsible for buildings worthy of preservation. Most listed and preserved buildings are privately owned.

Status as listed is not restricted to very old or very grand buildings. Eligibility extends to everything from castles and mansions to town halls, prisons, farmhouses, factories, warehouses and filling stations.

=== Museums ===
The State owns approximately 10 museums (some of which have departments spread out over many locations), and approximately 120 are approved to receive State subsidies. The Heritage Agency does not run any museums itself, but provides funding and supervises all State-subsidised museums and most of the State-owned museums. These museums are subject to the Danish Museum Act and must comply with a number of its requirements in order to receive funding.

A State-subsidised museum can be an independent institution or it can be owned by one or more local authorities or by an association designed to run it. A private museum cannot be approved for State subsidies.

== Registers ==
=== National Register of Sites and Monuments ===
The National Register of Sites and Monuments (Danish: Kulturhistorisk Centralregister) is a register of all known sites, monuments and archaeological finds. It holds information on more than 165,000 sites, of which some 7,000 are shipwrecks and submarine Stone Age settlements.

In 1873, the National Museum of Denmark embarked on a project to map all burial mounds, megalithic tombs, runic stones and other archaeological sites in Denmark. This mapping is the basis of the current digital register.

Under the Danish Museum Act, museums have an obligation to report new finds and activities to the Heritage Agency. This increases the register considerably every year.

=== Danish Museums' Collections Registers ===
Museums owned or subsidised by the State must report their collections to two national registers maintained by the Heritage Agency. Both registers are accessible online and hold information on the cultural heritage museums' collections of objects and materials, and the works held by art museums.

=== Danish Cultural Heritage Register ===
Established in 2004, the register of the cultural heritage museums' collections holds information on approximately two million objects. The register provides a national overview that makes it easier for the museums to coordinate and prioritise their investigations and collections.

=== Danish Art Register ===
The central register of works of art in Danish museums and collections was established in 1985 and went online in 1996. The register holds information on approximately 100,000 works by Danish and international artists. In addition, it provides access to a digital edition of Weilbach's Dictionary of Danish artists and international artists who have worked in Denmark.
