= Aarhus Mølle =

Coordinates: 56.1592°N 10.1911°E

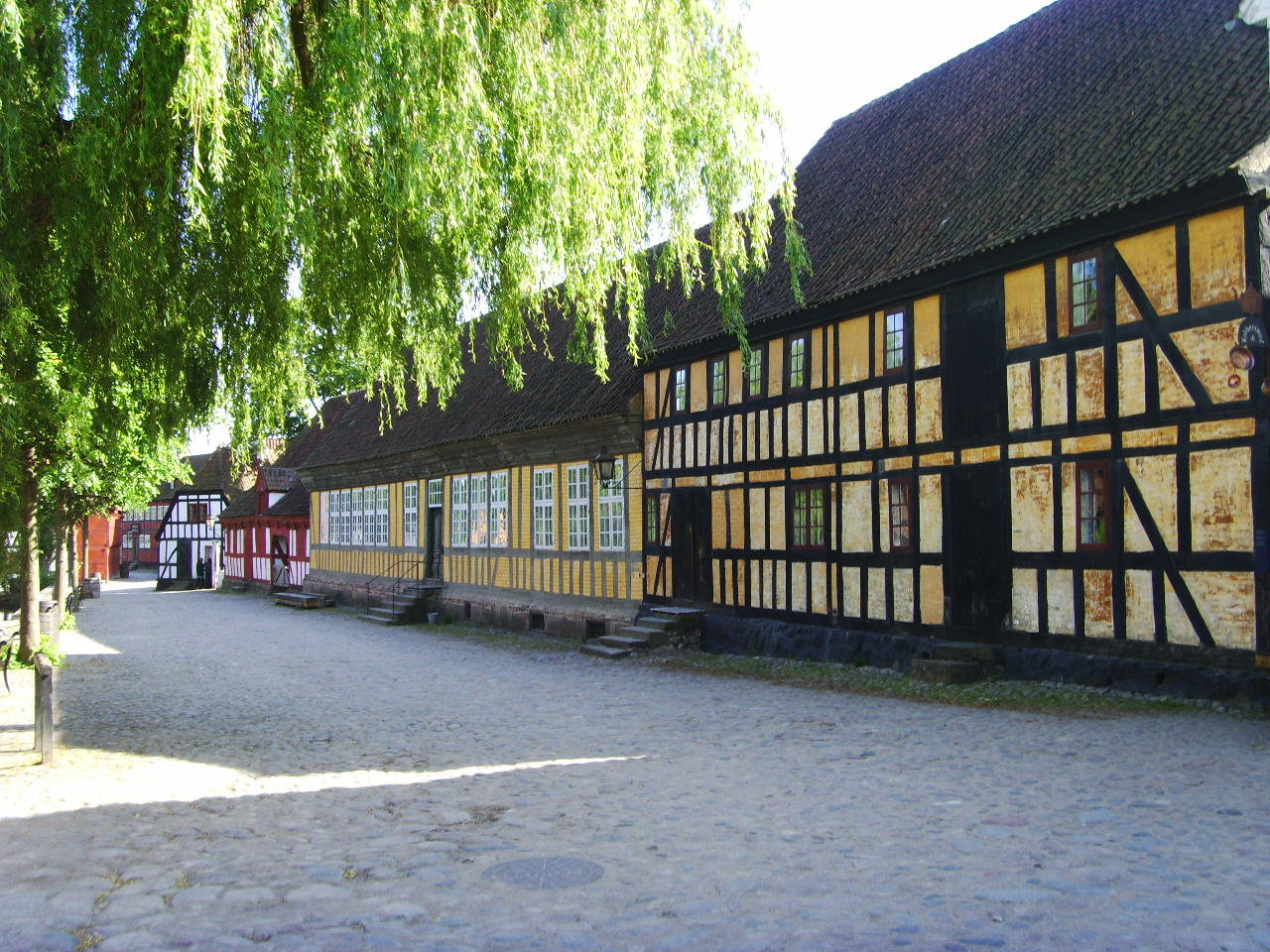
- Aarhus Mølle seen from the street side in Old Town Museum
- Interactive map of the Aarhus Mølle area

General information
- Architectural style: Renaissance Architecture
- Location: Aarhus, Denmark
- Completed: 1895

Design and construction
- Architect: Sophus Frederik Kühnel

Aarhus Mølle (Aarhus Mill) is a building in Aarhus, Denmark. The mill dates back to at least 1289 but the oldest of the existing buildings are from the 1600s while the main building is from c. 1700. The building complex comprise three buildings; a main building from c. 1700, a stables from the 1600s and a malt mill from 1782. Originally constructed on Vestergade in the Indre by neighborhood it has since been moved to the Old Town Museum where it is now used as the main administrative building and for some museum-related workshops.

Many places in Aarhus has been named for the mill; the Aarhus river used to be called Mølleåen (Mill-river) and there was a large pond by the mill known as Mølledammen (Mill pond). The city gate Mølleport (Mill Gate) lay on the corner of Vester Alle and Vestergade. Until 1910 a part of Vestergade was called Møllegade (Mill Street). Present day Mølleparken (Mill Park) was created on the old pond used by the mill.

== History ==
Aarhus Mill was built at some point in the early Middle Ages. The exact date is not known but it is mentioned for the first time in records from 1289 and later in 1581 when a new mill was built. The mill was built on the Aarhus river west of Aarhus and east of Brabrand Lake and was mainly used for malt and flour production. In the later Middle Ages it became illegal to mill products privately and farmers were forced to use one of the official, royally recognized mills, including Aarhus Mill.

In 1861 the mill was converted from water power to steam power but a few years later, in 1873, the flour production stopped as machines became more common during the Industrial Revolution. The mill remained in use to some extent until 1913. In 1926 the mill was bequeathed to the Old Town Museum when the last owner of it died. The four main buildings were moved to the Old Town in 1928 and today houses the administration and several workshops.

In 1849 one of the buildings burned down and during the cleanup a rune stone was discovered in the foundation. The stone was salvaged and is today displayed at Moesgård Museum which also uses the motif of the stone as its logo. The stone is known as "Aarhusstenen" (The Aarhus Stone) or "Maskestenen" (The Mask Stone).

== Architecture ==
The main building is from around 1700, designed with Baroque style elements. It is a half-timbered structure designed with two lower wall studs and one upper stud which was typical for the early Baroque in the Danish provincial cities in Jutland. The pronounced cornice is also characteristic for Baroque buildings. The color palette of grey-blue lumber with yellow panels and red joints are from around 1800.

== Owners ==
- 1289-????: ????
- 1581-????: Anders Possin
- 1644–1753: Jens Jensen and Marie Wissing
- 1753-????: Christian Henrich Grotum and Jens Wissings enke.
- ????-1773: Lars Christian Meulengracht (????-1773)
- 1790–1793: Frederik Christian Dahl and Christian Faurschou
- 1793–1805: Frederik Christian Dahl
- 1805–1815: Johannes Dahl
- 1815–1817: Kjerstine Dahl
- 1817–1839: Christian Guldager, married Kjerstine Dahl
- 1839–1846: Kirstine Dahl
- 1846–1889: Andreas Severin Weis
- 1889–1912: Ernst August Weis
- 1912–1926: Wilhelmine Weis
- 1926–present: Old Town Museum
