= Vestergade 58 =

Coordinates: 56.1575°N 10.2009°E

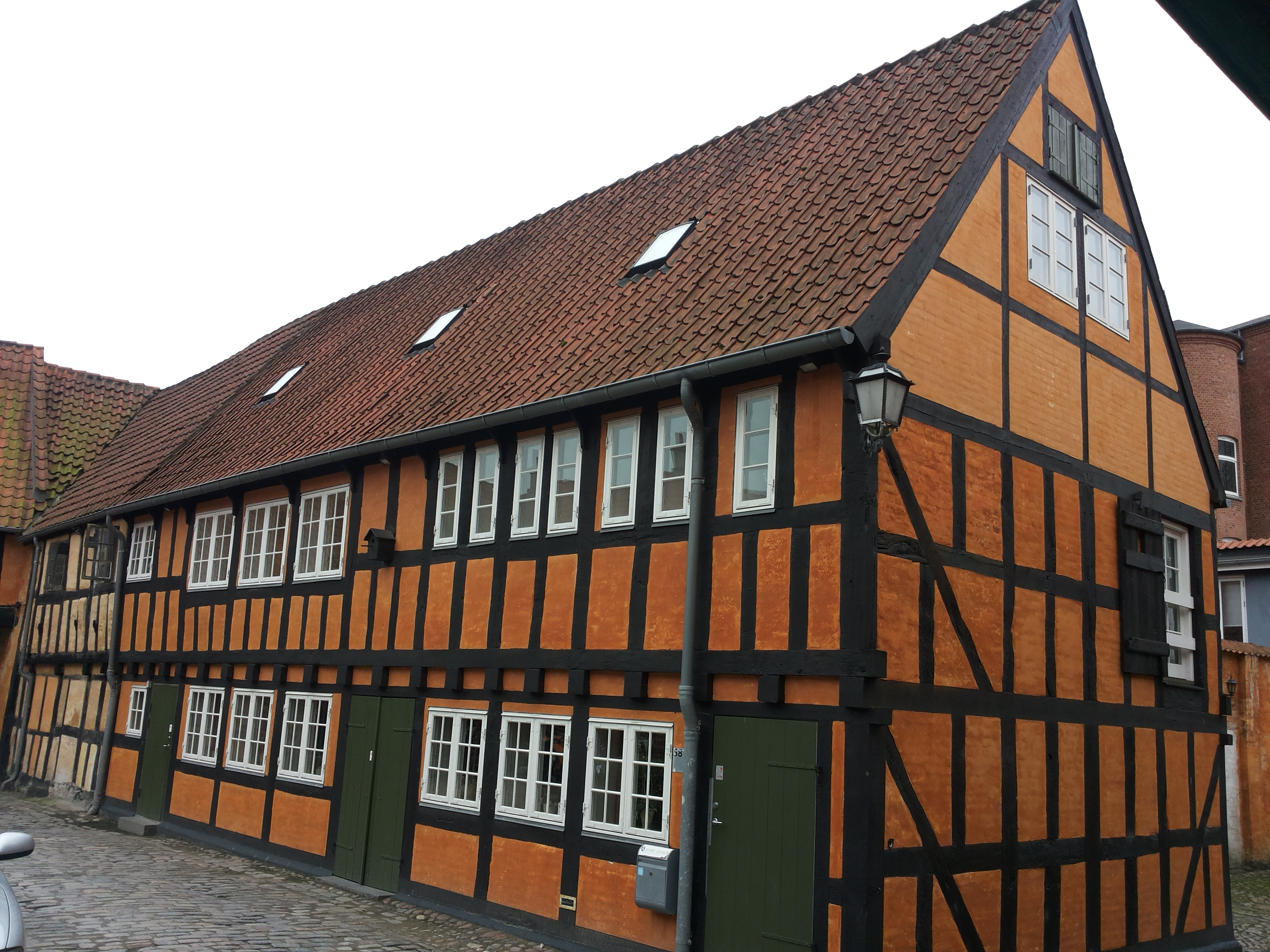
- Interactive map of the Vestergade 58 area

General information
- Architectural style: Half-timbered
- Location: Aarhus, Denmark
- Completed: 1761

Vestergade 58 is a listed building in Aarhus, Denmark. The listing includes 6 buildings on Vestergade in Aarhus, in the Indre by neighborhood, The buildings were constructed around 1761 and were listed by the Danish Heritage Agency in 1950. The buildings were originally a merchant's mansion used for trade and storage but in the 1960s it became a cultural focal point in Aarhus as Musikernes Hus (The Musicians' House).

== Architecture ==
Vestergade 58 is a large half-timbered merchants house from 1761 consisting of six individual structures arranged in a square with only one building being visible from the street. The buildings have pitched roofs and whitewashed walls, painted yellow with black timber framing.

== Musicians' House ==
In the 1960s, the educational institutions expanded and Aarhus became dominated by students and their teachers. Vestergade became a center for culture with several jazz clubs, galleries and musical instrument stores. Vestergade no. 58 became the music venue Musikernes Hus, frequented by some of the best-known names in the Danish music-scene at the time such as Jens Okking, Gnags, Thomas Helmig, Henning Stærk, Steffen Brandt and Anne Linnet. For some years Musikernes Hus was the focal point of music in Aarhus.

== See also ==
- Listed buildings in Aarhus Municipality
