= Vestergade =

Vestergade (Danish: West Street) may refer to:

- Vestergade, Aarhus, a street in Aarhus, Denmark
- Vestergade, Copenhagen, a street in Copenhagen, Denmark
