= Peter Holm (museum director) =

Danish museum director and curator

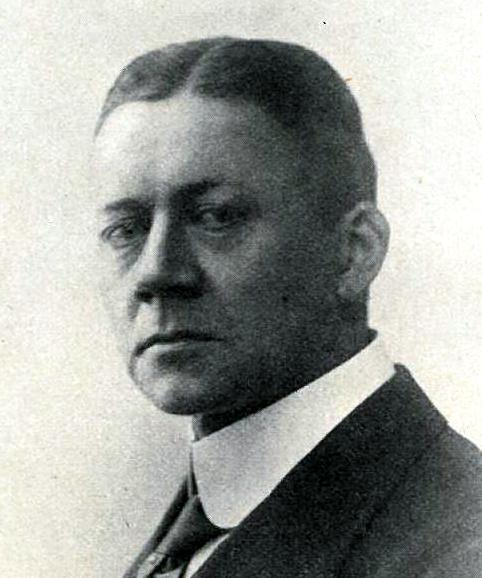
- Peter Holm, c. 1920
- Born: 14 May 1873; Aarhus, Denmark
- Died: 1 February 1950 (aged 76); Aarhus, Denmark

Peter Holm (14 May 1873 – 1 February 1950) was a Danish museum director and curator. Holm is best known for creating The Old Town Museum in Aarhus, Denmark, an open-air 'living' museum on the history of Danish life and architecture with a focus on the changes brought to urban life by the industrialization of the early 20th century and the development of the city through time. Holm worked against established museum organizations to create the first open air museum in Scandinavia and one of the largest open air museums in Europe.

== Private life ==
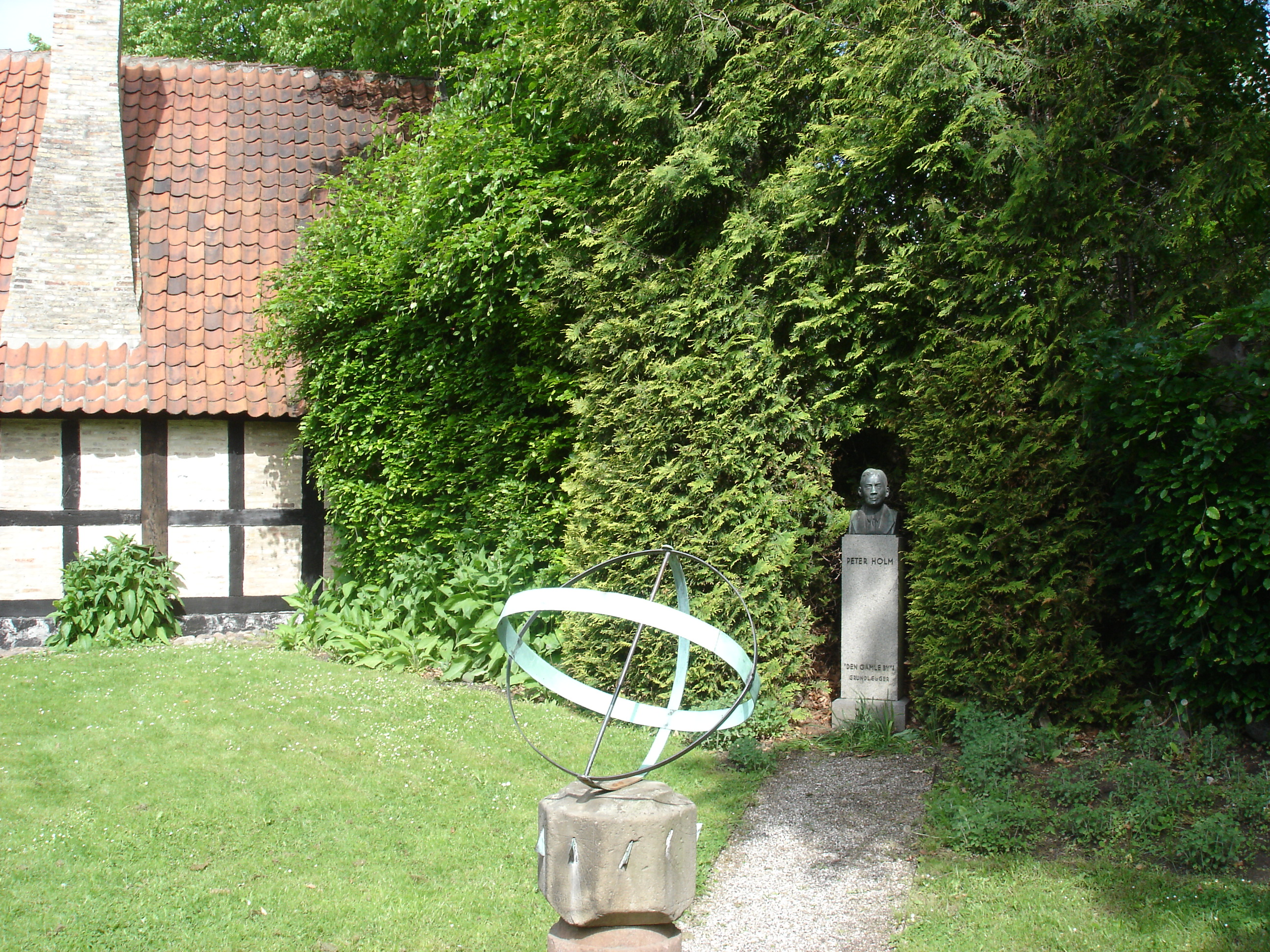
Bust of Peter Holm at the Old Town in Aarhus

Peter Holm was born in Aarhus on 13 April 1873. He was from an old Aarhusian family of craftsmen and had from his earliest years an interest in history, especially locally. He graduated from Jonstrup Seminary in 1891 and from 1894 to 1918 he worked as a teacher at Aarhus Municipal schools. In 1898 he obtained a translator's license in translation in English and over the following years he translated a number of from English. In 1899 he was married with Agnes Charlotte von Haven (1876-1929) with whom he had the son Ralph Christian. He was self-taught in the museum world; originally trained as a school-teacher, later working as a translator in English and German in many years alongside his work at the museum. As a school teacher he was known for his skills of persuasion. He had a teacher's license in Swedish, German, English and French and was a teacher for 27 years, of which 20 took place in Aarhus.

In 1907 he was elected to the board of the Aarhus Museum. The same year he was appointed to chairman for the committee to hold a historical exhibit of Aarhus on the Danish National Exhibition of 1909. In 1909 he was made inspector of the museum Den gamle Borgmestergård (English: The Old Mayors's Mansion), consisting of a stately house formerly occupied by many of Aarhus' mayors. For the National Exhibition Holm reconstructed in the mayor's mansion a number of rooms from different time periods between 1597 and 1848. The exhibition won such acclaim that a wish to preserve the mayors mansion as a museum manifested. After some negotiation the mansion was moved from the former exhibition grounds and rebuilt in 1914 at Aarhus Botanical Gardens.

In spite of opposition in the museum-world Holm gradually expanded the museum which over time turned into a nationally unique institution with some 55 buildings from the end of the 1500s to the beginning of the 1800s. In 1921 his marriage with Agnes Charlotte von Haven was dissolved. He was married again in 1921, to Petra Julie Nielsen (1889-1983) who from that year became responsible for the textile collection in The Old Town, Aarhus, from 1938 as a museum inspector. In 1924 the museum was renamed Købstadmuseet Den Gamle By (Market Town Museum: The Old Town). Holm especially worked with atmospheric tableau's and built convincing streets-capes and interiors. In 1933 he was made Museum Director which he stayed until 1945. In addition to work at the school and museum Holm was involved in a number of local museum and tourism organizations. He was secretary for Samvirkende Jydske Turistforeninger for 12 years and was in the board of the Gamle Bygningers Bevaring. He was also in the board of Turistforeningen for Aarhus og omegn and in 1903 he became member of the Kongelige Nordiske Oldskriftsselskab.

== Honors ==
In 1934 he was awarded the Hielmstierne-Rosencroneske stiftelses prismedalje. In 1946 he was made dr. phil. honoris causa at Aarhus University. He received the Order of the Dannebrog and was later made Knights of the Order of the Dannebrog.
