= X (Gnags album) =

Studio album by Gnags
- Released: 1983 (LP); 1995 (CD)
- Recorded: Feedback Studio; Århus, Denmark
- Genre: Rock
- Length: 37:01
- Label: Genlyd Grammofon
- Producer: Jack Nuber

Gnags chronology
Safari	X	Den blå hund

X is the tenth LP album released 1983 by the Danish rock band Gnags. The album was released digitally remastered in 1995 on CD.

== Track listing ==
1. Fodgænger — 4:03
2. Slingrer ned ad Vestergade — 4:13
3. Fuldmånen Lyser — 3:45
4. Forvandlingskugler — 3:22
5. Tossefugle — 3:44
6. Havnen med Skibe — 3:36
7. Tømmerflåden — 4:11
8. Zebrafinken — 2:52
9. Fuldmånevandvid — 4:03
10. Alt Synes Ro Ombord — 3:12
