= Mønsted's House =

Coordinates: 56.1575°N 10.2050°E

- Mønsteds Hus
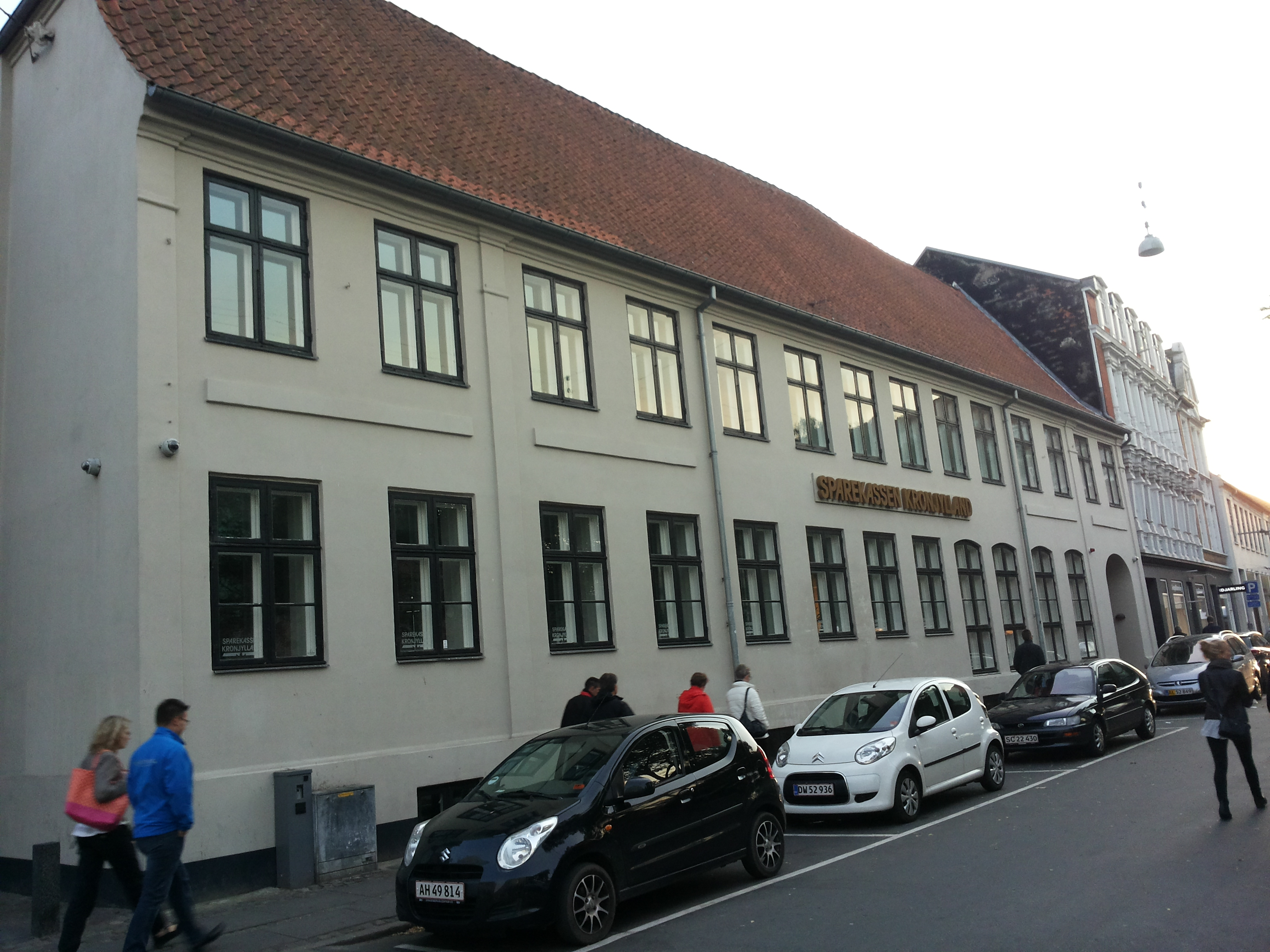
- Interactive map of the Mønsted's House area

General information
- Architectural style: Historicism
- Location: Aarhus, Denmark
- Completed: 1810

Technical details
- Floor count: 1
- Floor area: 468 m^{2} (5,040 sq ft)

Mønsted's House (Danish: Mønsteds Gård) is a house and a listed building in Aarhus, Denmark. The house was built in 1810 and was listed on the Danish registry of protected buildings and places by the Danish Heritage Agency on 24 March 1950. The building is situated in the historic Indre by neighborhood on Vestergade across from the Church of Our Lady. The reason for the listing was partly the historical significance and importance of the building and the impact of its former inhabitants.

== History ==
In 1810 the merchant Hartvig Philip Rée bought a parcel of land on Vestergade 11 and constructed the building which would become known as Mønsted's House. Rée established several factories on the property and gradually built up a large fleet of merchant vessels. Rée successfully navigated the Danish state bankruptcy of the early 19th century and tax registers show he was the highest individual in 1818. Rée eventually became the first person of Jewish descend in Denmark who was admitted to the small group of eligible citizens who could vote and hold official office.

In 1865 Otto Mønsted settled in the city where he married the daughter of the local industry magnate Hans Broge in 1870. In 1893 Mønsted bought the factories on Vestergade which had been at the center of his trade and industry empire for over a decade at the time. Mønsted opened a margarine factory at the site which eventually became the brand "OMA – Otto Mønsted Aarhus". In 1900 the factories were renovated after a fire and a neighboring property was bought up. The factory grew to be one of the largest employers in the city until 1948 when production was moved to Copenhagen.

The building constructed by Rée and facing Vestergade became known as Mønsted's House. Rée, Mønsted and the industrial production that took place on the Vestergade property had a large impact on the city in the late 19th and early 20th centuries and this was factored into the decision to list the building. The building material is brick and the building is 14 joists wide with a facade divided by pilasters.
