= Science Museums, Aarhus =

Museum organization in Denmark

Science Museums Aarhus
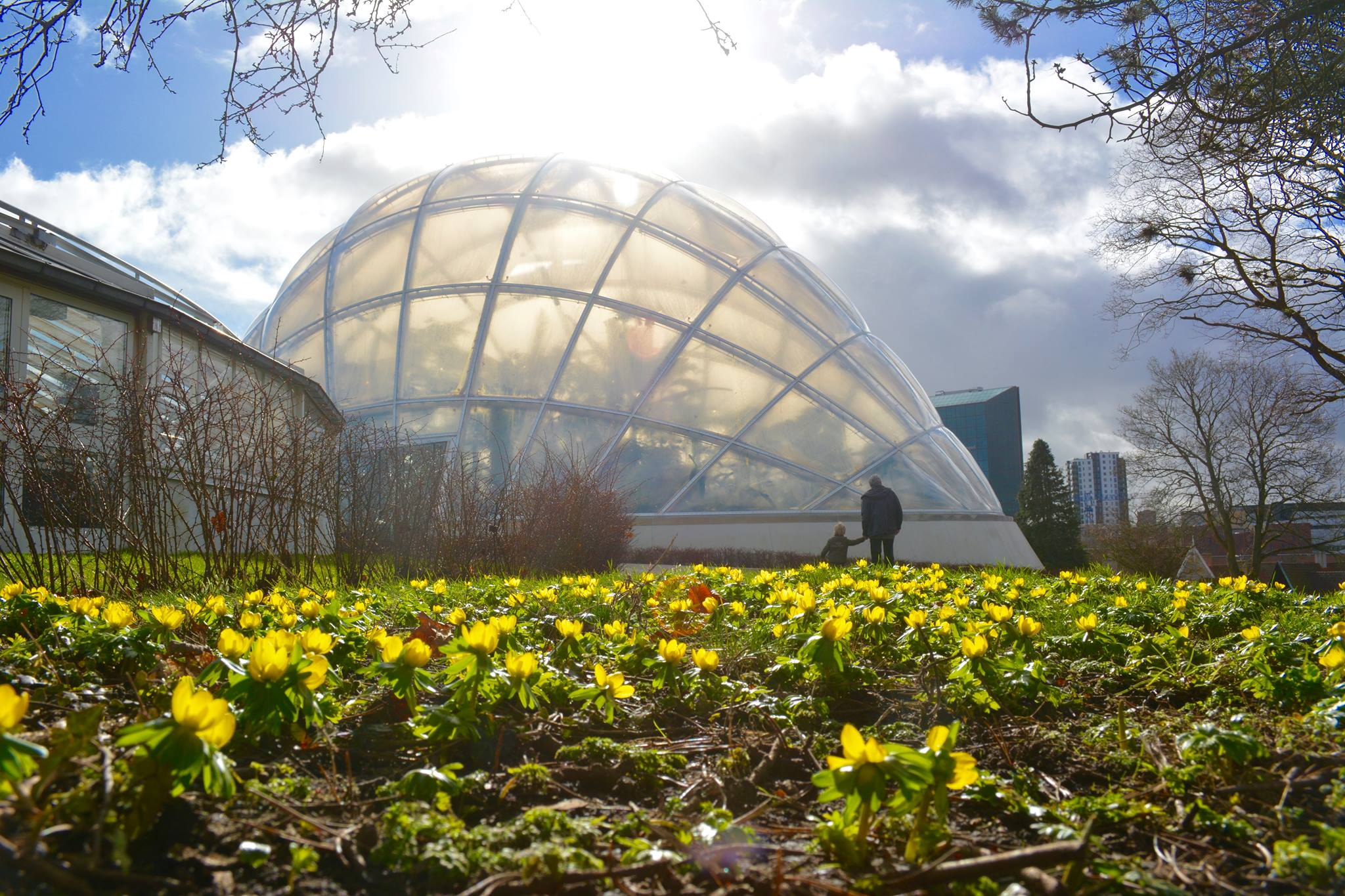
- Established: 2008
- Location: Aarhus, Denmark
- Owner: Aarhus University
- Website: https://sciencemuseerne.dk/en/

Science Museums, Aarhus, founded 1 January 2008, is an organization at Aarhus University in Aarhus, Denmark. It comprises the Steno Museum, the Greenhouses at Aarhus Botanical Gardens, the Ole Rømer Observatory and a herbarium. The Science Museums operates under the Faculty of Natural Sciences at Aarhus University and is partly funded by the Faculty of Health.

In 2024, Science Museums Aarhus had a total of 277,053 visitors.

== The museums ==
=== The Greenhouses ===
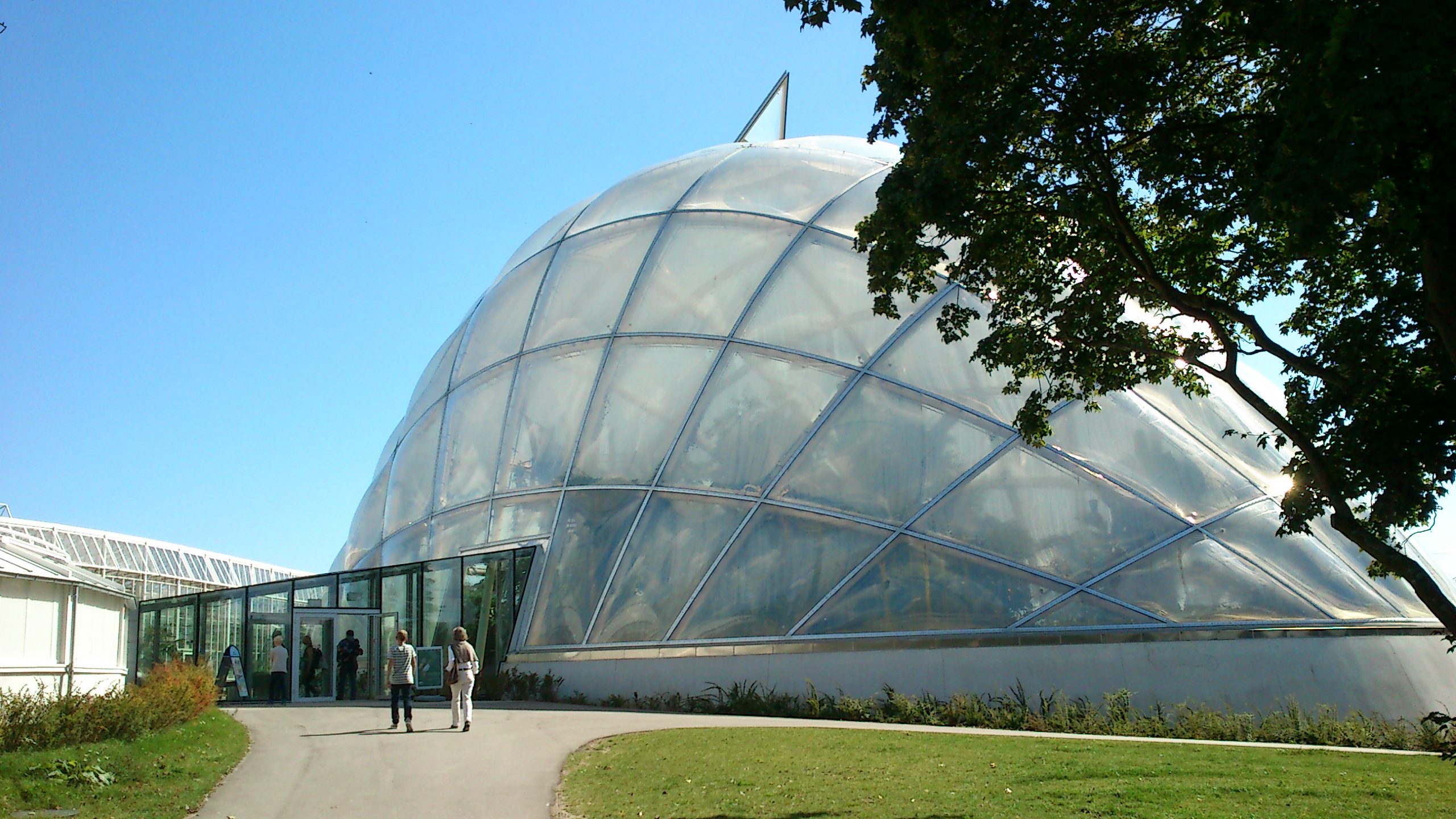
The Greenhouses, with the new hothouse dome.

Situated in the Aarhus Botanical Gardens in the inner city since 1970 (56.1603°N 10.1937°E), the Greenhouses have seen a heavy renovation and expansion from 2011 to 2014. As the surrounding botanical gardens, the Greenhouses have changed focus from an academic research- and study-ground (with public access) to public outreach, events and education, but with the same diversity of plants.

There is a café, shop and educational facilities at the Greenhouses.

=== Ole Rømer Observatory ===
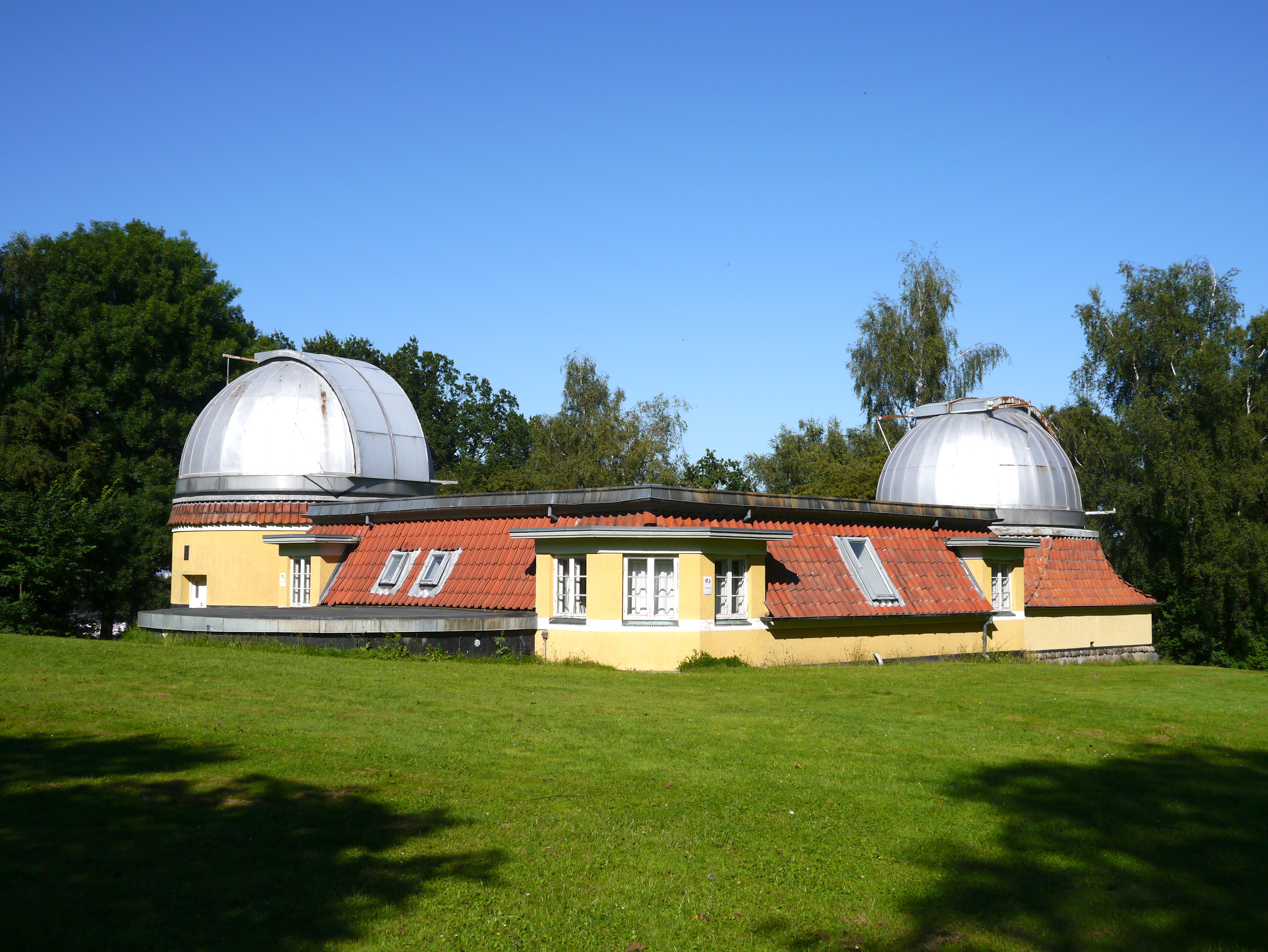
The Ole Rømer Observatory.

Built in 1911, the Ole Rømer Observatory (56.1277°N 10.1933°E) is an astronomical observatory named after the famous astronomer Ole Rømer. It was initiated in 1908 by the German astronomer Friedrich Krüger - with the help of Danish astronomer Victor Nielsen -, when he offered to relocate from Altenburg in Thüringen to Aarhus with his instruments, if the city council could present a building to house them. After a signed agreement, the Aarhus City Council initiated the construction project and choose the renowned Anton Rosen as architect. The buildings were listed by the former Danish Cultural Heritage Agency in 2006, as a fine and unique example of Danish Art Nouveau.

The observatory is situated in a small park, enclosed by tall trees, shading out the light pollution from the city somewhat. In association with the observatory itself, are recently restored buildings for housing guests to the Aarhus University.

The Ole Rømer Observatory has been part of Aarhus University right from the university's foundation in 1928 and it has always facilitated education, public outreach and research opportunities, as part of the original agreement. The observatory offers presentations and discussions on a broad array of astronomical topics on selected evenings and when the sky is clear (usually in autumn and winter), the observatory's two modern 11-inch Schmidt-Cassegrain telescopes are employed.

=== The Herbarium ===
The herbarium is a research-oriented plant collection of more than 750,000 preserved specimens from all over the world, established in 1963. Only researchers can gain physical access to the herbarium, but more than 136,000 samples have been digitized and is available on-line in a public database.

=== Steno Museum ===
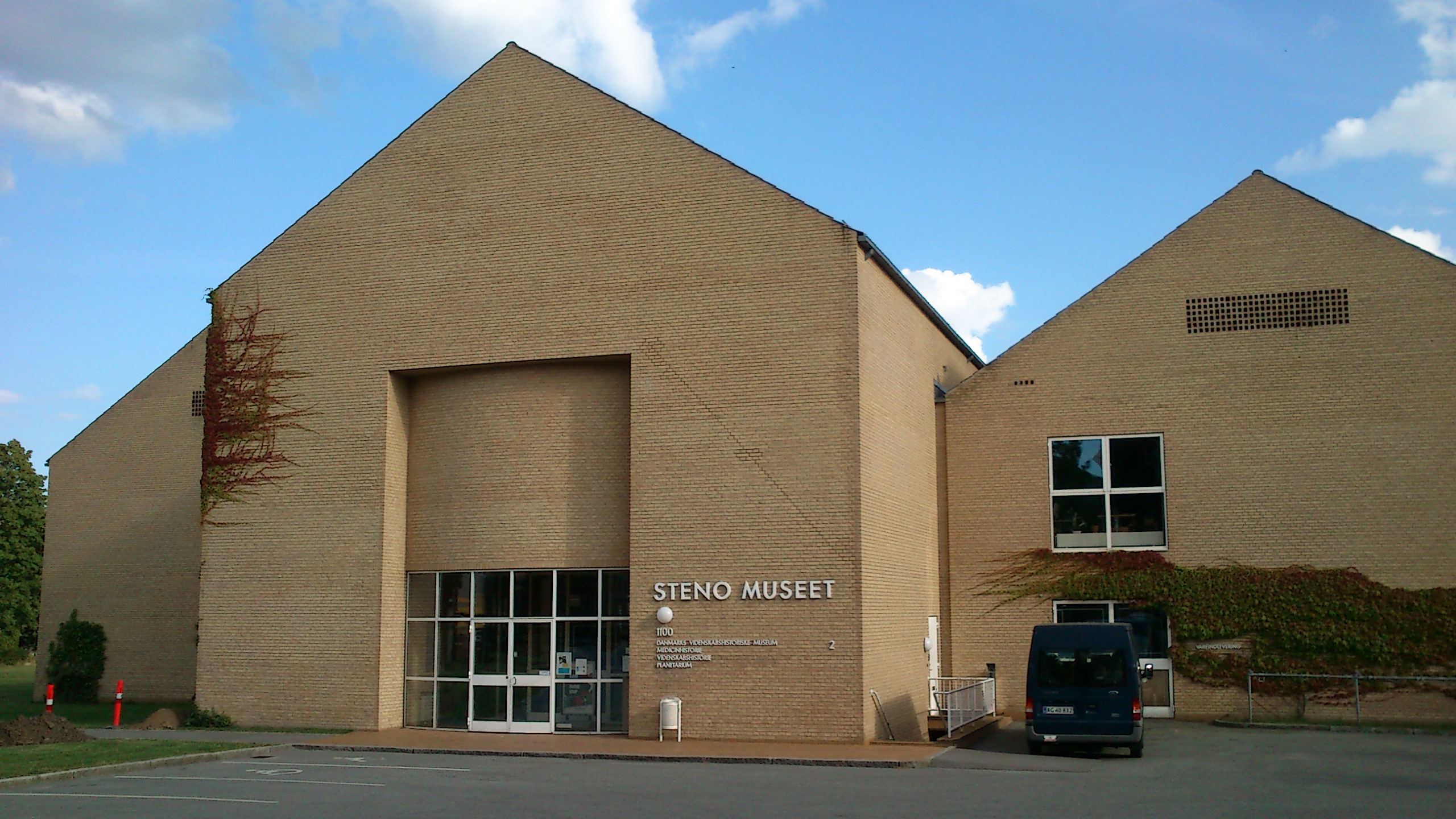
The Steno Museum. Main entrance.

Named after scientist and scholar Nicolas Steno (1638–1686), the Steno Museum is located in the southern part of the University Park (56.1654°N 10.2029°E), where it opened in 1994. The building was constructed from the characteristic yellow bricks, using the same architectural features as the original university buildings on the campus surrounding it.

The Steno Museum is dedicated to the history of science and medicine and focuses particularly on school and high school classes but also offers activities for adult audiences. Apart from the permanent exhibitions, the museum regularly displays themed temporary exhibitions as well.

The Steno Museum also includes a planetarium, an outdoor herbal garden with medicinal plants, a café and a shop.

== Sources ==
- Science Museums Official homepage.
