= Vestergade, Aarhus =

Street in Aarhus, Denmark

Vestergade
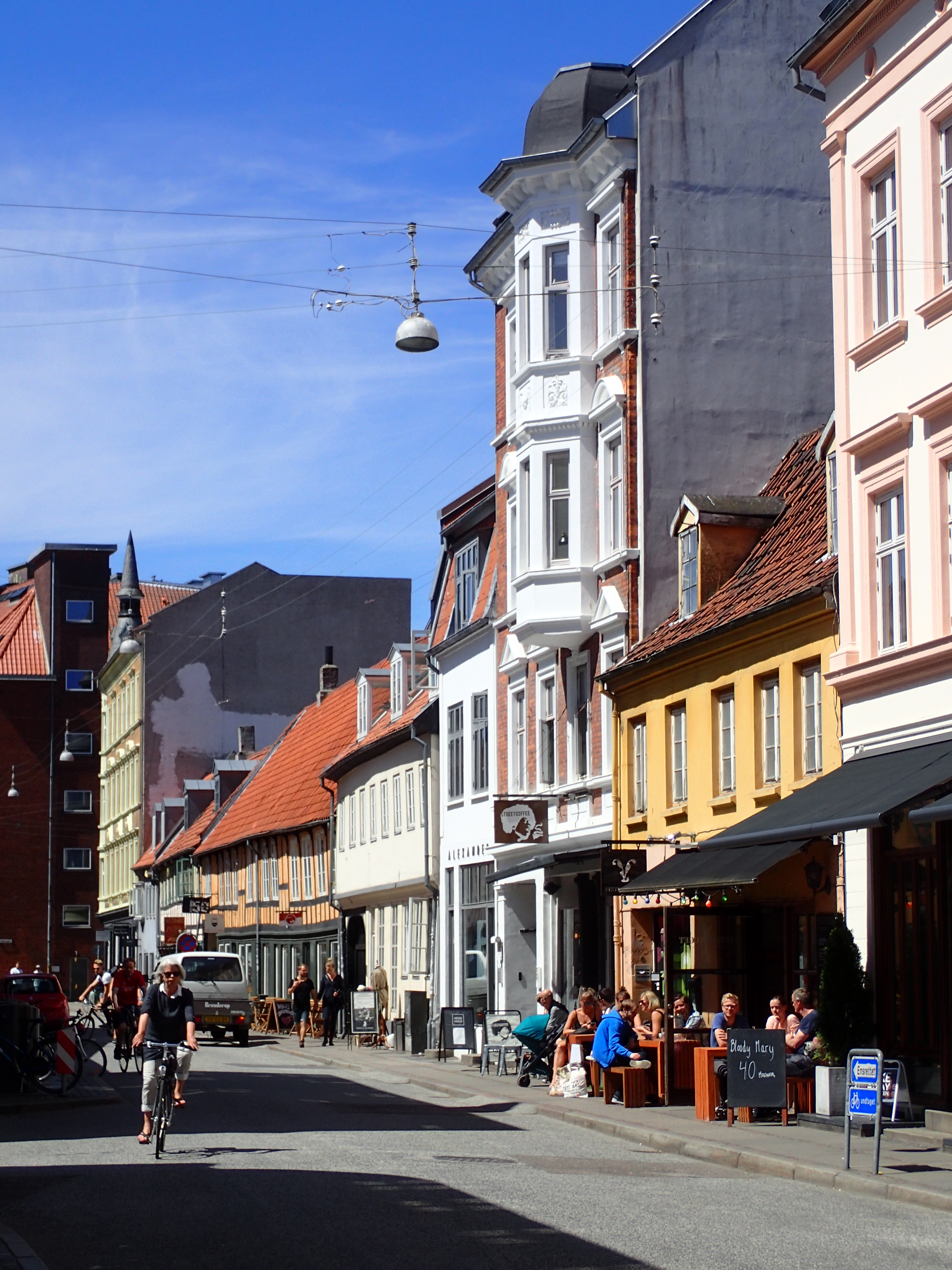
- Vestergade is a diverse mix of buildings, representing its long history
- Length: 718 m (2,356 ft)
- Location: Latin Quarter/Vesterbro, Aarhus, Denmark
- Postal code: 8000
- Coordinates: 56°09′27.1″N 10°12′04.9″E

Vestergade (lit: Westward-street) is a street in Aarhus, Denmark, which runs east to west from the central square of Store Torv to the city park of Åparken at Carl Blochs Gade, intersecting the main streets of Grønnegade and Vester Allé along its course. Vestergade begins in the Indre By neighborhood and ends in neighborhood of Vesterbro, close to CeresByen. Vestergade has some of the best preserved 18th-century merchant estates in Aarhus and a history of creativity and artistic expression.

Vestergade was the original road leading to Viborg in the old Viking Age settlement. The buildings along Vestergade were the first outside the western defensive ramparts and formed the first civilian settlement. Originally, the street ended at Grønnegade but has since been lengthened as the city grew around it. Vestergade represents most periods in the history of Aarhus.

== History ==
The early Viking Age settlement is thought to have been a military fortress and port. In the 900s, a settlement gradually developed outside the ramparts by the western gate. The new settlement housed traders, craftsmen, farmers and others that made a living dealing with the military base but were not permitted within it. In the settlement, a wooden church was constructed on the site of present-day Church of Our Lady. Vestergade is the street that led from the western gate of the fortress through the settlement by the church.

In the 11th century, Aarhus had become the seat of a diocese and the wooden church was replaced by a new whitewashed travertine church devoted to St. Nicholas; officially the cathedral of the diocese. Vestergade became the trade and ecclesiastical center while the fortress remained the domain of the king and military. However, by the late 11th century the power of the church had grown and the King and Catholic Church worked more closely together. The fortress was opened for civilian use and a new cathedral was constructed within it. The St. Nicholas church was subsequently given to the Dominican Order which built a convent around it and eventually tore the church itself down. Until the Reformation, the convent in Vestergade was home to the Dominicans and their beggar monks.

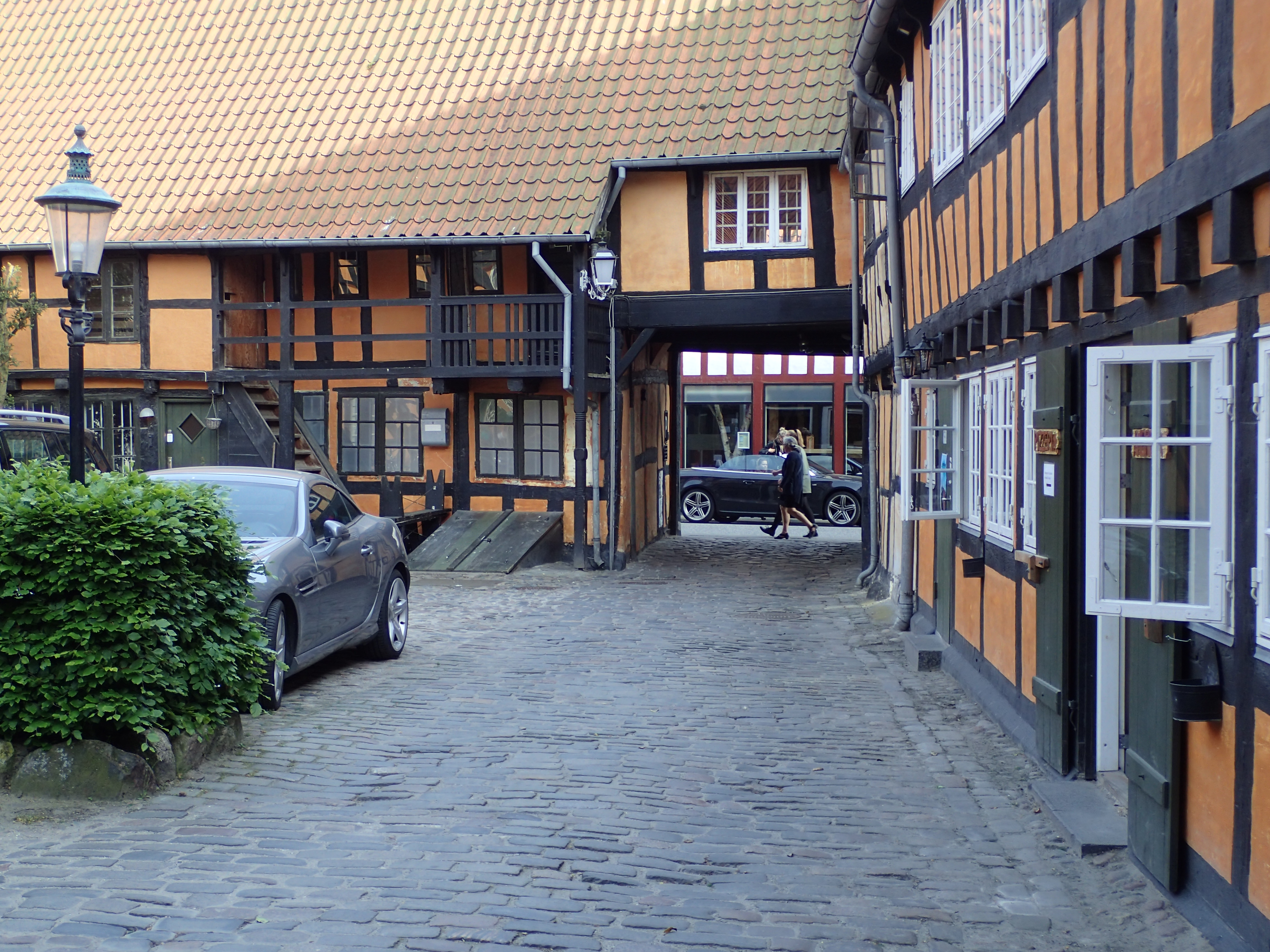
Vestergade no. 58 from 1761 is a four-winged timber framed merchant estate.

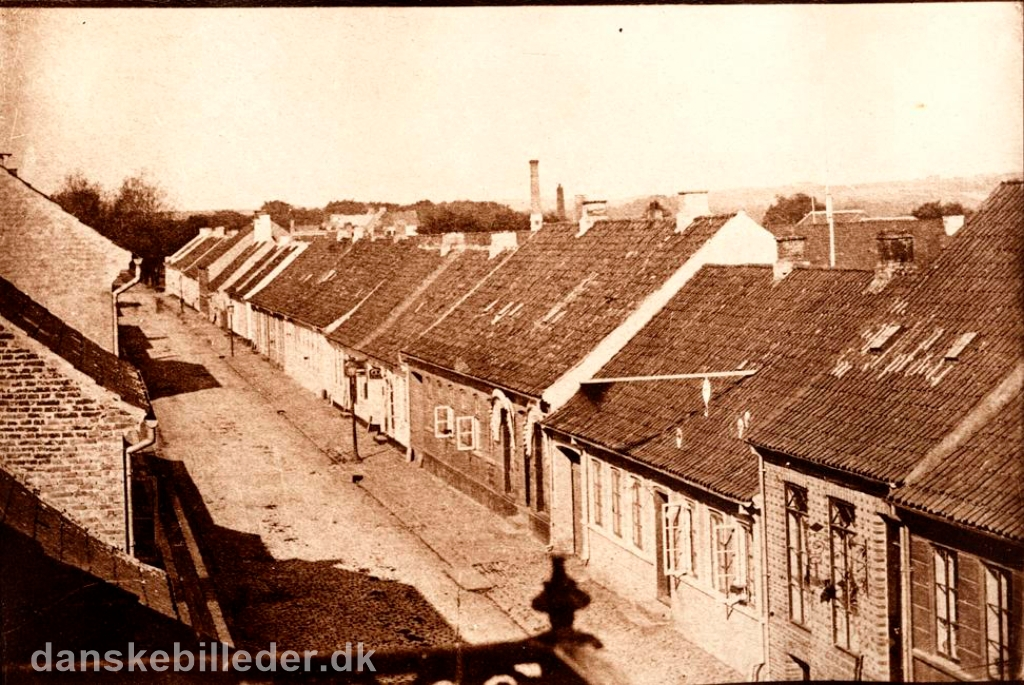
Vestergade's low housing (1865) in the growing city of the industrial age

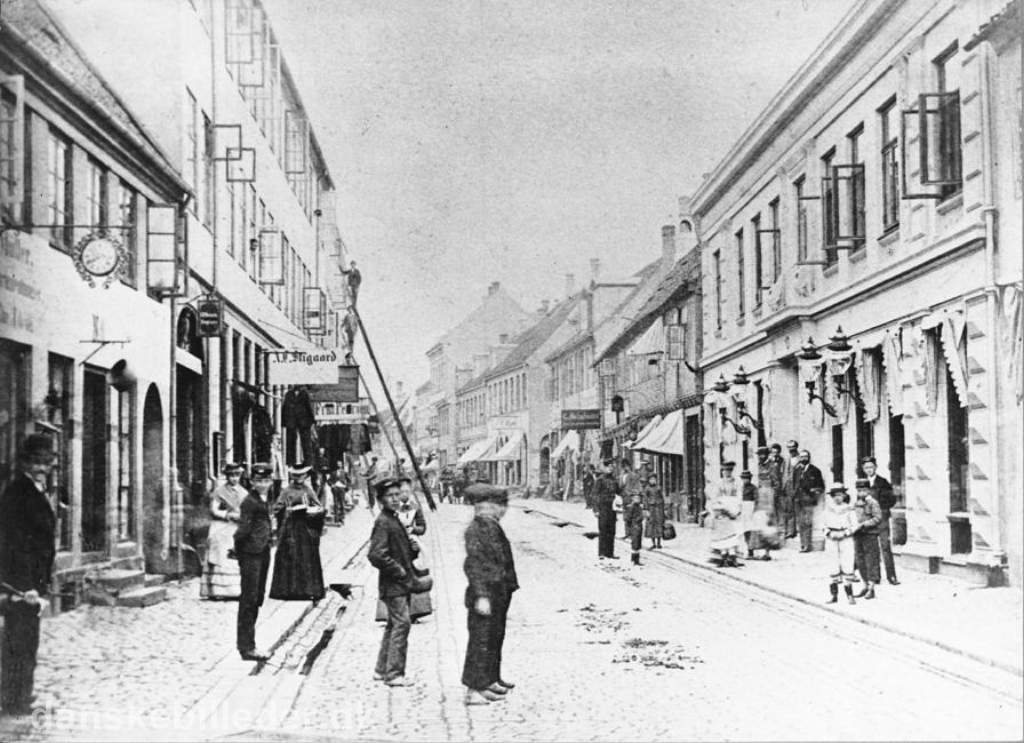
Vestergade in 1884 seen from Lille Torv

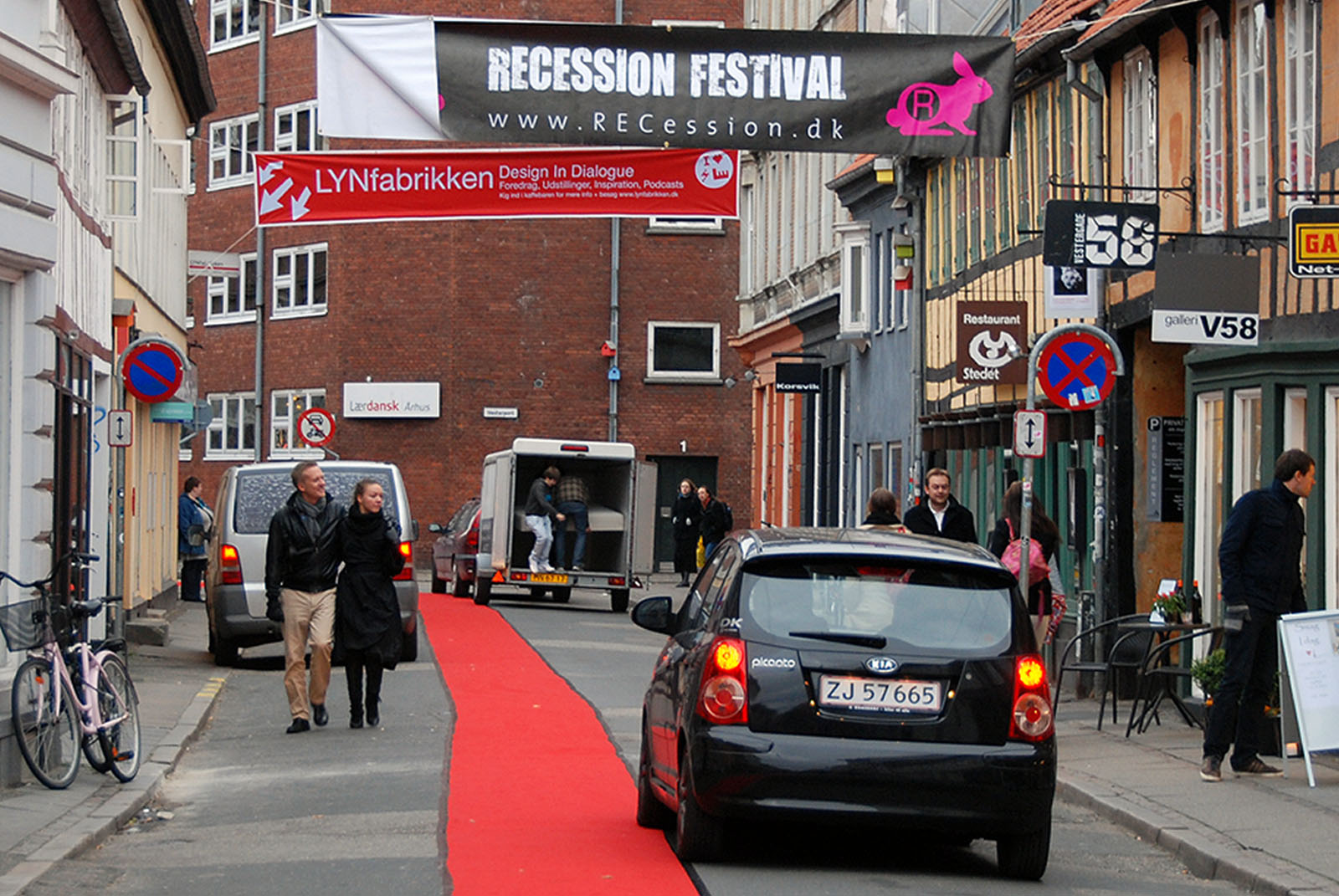
Vestergade street party is held every summer

The end of the Middle Ages saw the rising importance of trade and crafts. The merchant became a more powerful figure, acting as the middleman between farmers and the city. The new merchant class built expansive houses with stables and storage space on the streets leading to the city gates in a bid to be the first to trade with farmers. Vestergade had most of these, seventeen in all, followed by Mejlgade which had sixteen by the northern city gate. The best preserved example is the listed no. 58, comprising four half-timbered wings.

In 1529, the Dominicans abandoned their convent in Vestergade as the Reformation had made the people less favorable to their to cause. In 1533, a civil war broke out and in 1536 the Lutheran Christian III emerged victorious. Church, convent and diocesan properties were confiscated by the crown. In the short term this meant a complete restructuring of the economy since the vast lands owned by the church had resulted in wealth being concentrated in the cathedral in the city.

During the following 200 years, the merchant fleet expanded and trade continued to grow. The merchant estates typically had small homes for rent behind it where craftsmen would rent and operate the first small factories. Vestergade and Skolegade were also rife with legal and illegal bars making Vestergade a lively place. By 1733, Aarhus had the largest merchant fleet in the country and the economy was thriving.

In the early 1800s, the Danish state default and the loss of Norway hampered trade and the merchant fleet shrank. In the 1850s, political reforms broke the merchant monopolies the economy rebounded. Industrialization began and several factories were built in the city and Vestergade. Otto Mønsted established a margarine factory on Vestergade no. 11 and a tobacco factory opened in Vestergade no. 29. Vestergade, formerly dominated by merchants and nightlife, became dominated by industrial production.

The Great Depression hit the city hard and many of the small workshops were converted to speakeasys. In the 1930s, Vestergade became a center for moonshine, prostitution and gambling. During the occupation by Germany in the Second World War, the assortment was further expanded to include the black market.

In the 1950s, the city center was subjected to the first organized city planning efforts. The eastern section of Vestergade was demolished along with the entirety of Nygade. The old mayor's mansion on Lille Torv was moved to the Old Town Museum where it stands today. The modern buildings that replaced the old create a stark contrast to the old section of Vestergade.

In the 1960s, the educational institutions expanded and Aarhus became dominated by students and their teachers. Vestergade became a center for culture with several jazz clubs, galleries and musical instrument stores. Vestergade no. 58 became a music venue and a small theatre frequented by among others Jens Okking, Gnags, Thomas Helmig, Henning Stærk and Anne Linnet. In Vestergade no. 38 a small theatre was established; it later became Svalegangen and moved to Rosensgade 11.

In the 2010s, Vestergade is no longer the center for music it used to be but art is still represented with Aarhus Art Academy, galleries and handicrafts. It has become a popular street for bars, cafés and restaurants.

== Notable buildings ==
There are four listed properties in Vestergade and one with address on Lille Torv, on the corner of Vestergade. Vestergade no. 1 is a small merchant's house from 1540 consisting of a brick building facing the street and two half-timbered buildings behind it with a diminutive courtyard between them. It is the oldest listed house in Aarhus and may be the oldest residential building. Vestergade 1 was listed in 1919. Vestergade 58 is a large half-timbered merchants house from 1761 consisting of six individual structures, listed in 1950. Vestergade 11, also known as Mønsted's House, was Otto Mønsted's factory site in the 1800s and was listed in 1950. Vestergade 29, which today houses Aarhus Art Academy, is a house in historicst style which was listed in 1924. The Business- and Agricultural Bank of Jutland building is situated on the corner of Lille Torv and Vestergade. It is an Italian Renaissance-style building from 1899 which previously housed a bank.

== See also ==
- Architecture of Aarhus
