= Burhøns =

Studio album by Gnags
- Released: 1979 (LP); 1996 (CD)
- Recorded: Feedback Mobile Studio; Småland, Sweden
- Genre: Rock
- Length: 37:15
- Label: Genlyd Grammofon
- Producer: Gnags

Gnags chronology
Er du hjemme i aften?	Burhøns	Intercity

Burhøns (English: Battery hens) is the sixth LP album released 1979 by the Danish rock band Gnags. The album was released digitally remastered 1996 on CD.

== Track listing ==
- All songs written and arranged by Gnags.
1. Burhøns — 4:21
2. Ugler i mosen — 3:15
3. Pyramiden — 4:02
4. Professionelle ballademagere — 3:03
5. Alt hvad jeg ved — 3:05
6. Ikke køre træt — 3:53
7. En tiger fra zoo — 3:03
8. Savner dig — 4:58
9. Fugl på skinner — 4:09
10. Nu, stjerne — 3:26

== Personnel ==
- Ivan Sørensen: Vocals, Guitars, Organ, Piano, Moog Synthesizers
- Per Christian Frost: Guitars, Organ, Piano, Moog Synthesizers
- Jacob Riis-Olsen: Vocals, Slide Guitar
- Henning Stærk: Vocals, Harmonica, Bass, Drums, Percussion
- Peter AG Nielsen: Vocals, Drums
- Jens J. Nielsen: Vocals, Percussion
