= Safari (Gnags album) =

Studio album by Gnags
- Released: 1982 (LP); 1995 (CD)
- Recorded: Feedback Lydstudiet; Århus, Denmark
- Genre: Rock
- Length: 37:13
- Label: Genlyd Grammofon
- Producer: Karl Pitterson

Gnags chronology
| Live Vol. 1 | Safari | X |

Safari is the ninth LP album released 1982 by the Danish rock band Gnags, the album was released digitally remastered 1995 on CD.

== Track listing ==
1. Safari — 3:10
2. Under Gadelygten — 4:40
3. Mellem Tremmerne — 3:40
4. Bliv hos mig, Bliv — 3:06
5. Ned ad Klitten — 4:09
6. Vild, vild Elefant — 3:54
7. Kikkerten — 3:30
8. Den sidste Hval — 4:17
9. Tekniske Insekter — 4:07
10. American Boy — 2:40
