= Aarhus Art Academy =

Art school in Aarhus, Denmark

Coordinates: 56°09′27.0″N 10°12′09.2″E

- Århus Kunstakademi
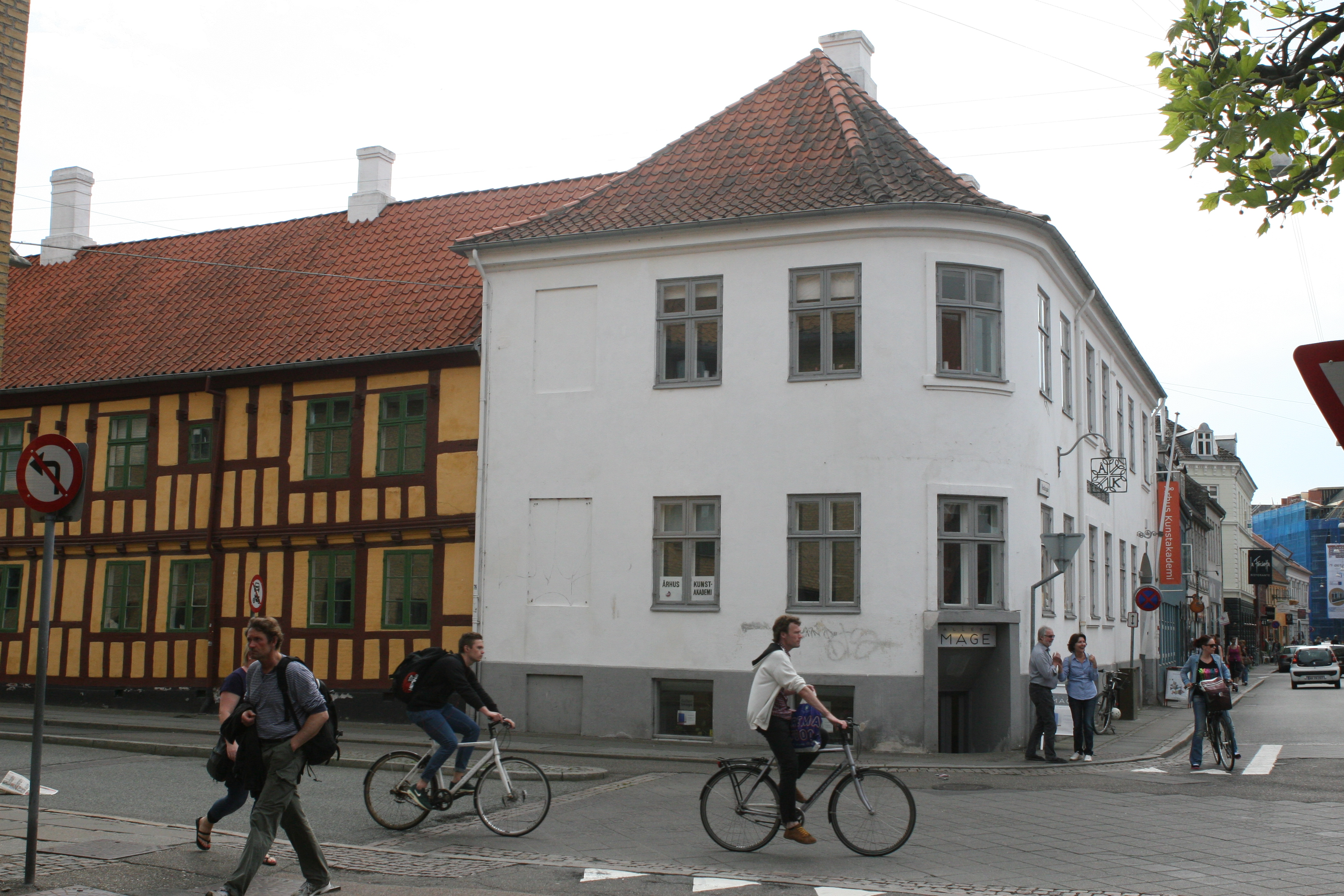
- Type: Public university
- Established: 1965
- Director: Ane Hejlskov Larsen
- Administrative staff: 28
- Students: 50 full time 1000 part time
- Location: Aarhus, Denmark
- Website: www.aarhuskunstakademi.dk

Aarhus Art Academy (Danish: Århus Kunstakademi) is an art school in Aarhus, Denmark. The school resides in a listed building on Vestergade 29 in the old medieval inner city, comprised by the neighborhood of Indre By. The building was listed on the Danish registry of protected buildings and places by the Danish Heritage Agency on 3 December 1924. The school offers a 4-year arts programme and a number of courses in sculpting, painting, design, ceramics, photo and webdesign.

== Academy ==
The academy offers a 4-year education in the arts focused on elective subjects such as sculpting, painting or design. Courses in various subjects without official state recognized accreditation are offered for part-time students on a hobby basis and this is the majority of the student body. The academy is a part of the Danish FORA network of educational organisations and institutions.

== The buildings ==
The academy building is a listed and protected structure; it was listed on 3 December 1924 as the first building to be registered in Aarhus. The main building at Vestergade no. 29 was constructed in 1881 in Historicst style, but was renovated in 1990. It remains largely original in appearance with the same white walls and grey base. The design is characterized by the middle section marked by flat whitewashed lesenes. The building material is brick covered in white plaster and it has a hip roof covered in winged brick. An attached courtyard and timber-framed wing facing the street of Grønnegade, was constructed earlier in the middle of the 1700s, and it was included in the listing in 1972.

The building used to house a tobacco factory in the late 19th century and the building complex is an example of one of the early small factories, constructed during the rapid industrialisation of the 19th and early 20th centuries.
