= Aarhus Botanical Gardens =

Botanical gardens in Aarhus, Denmark

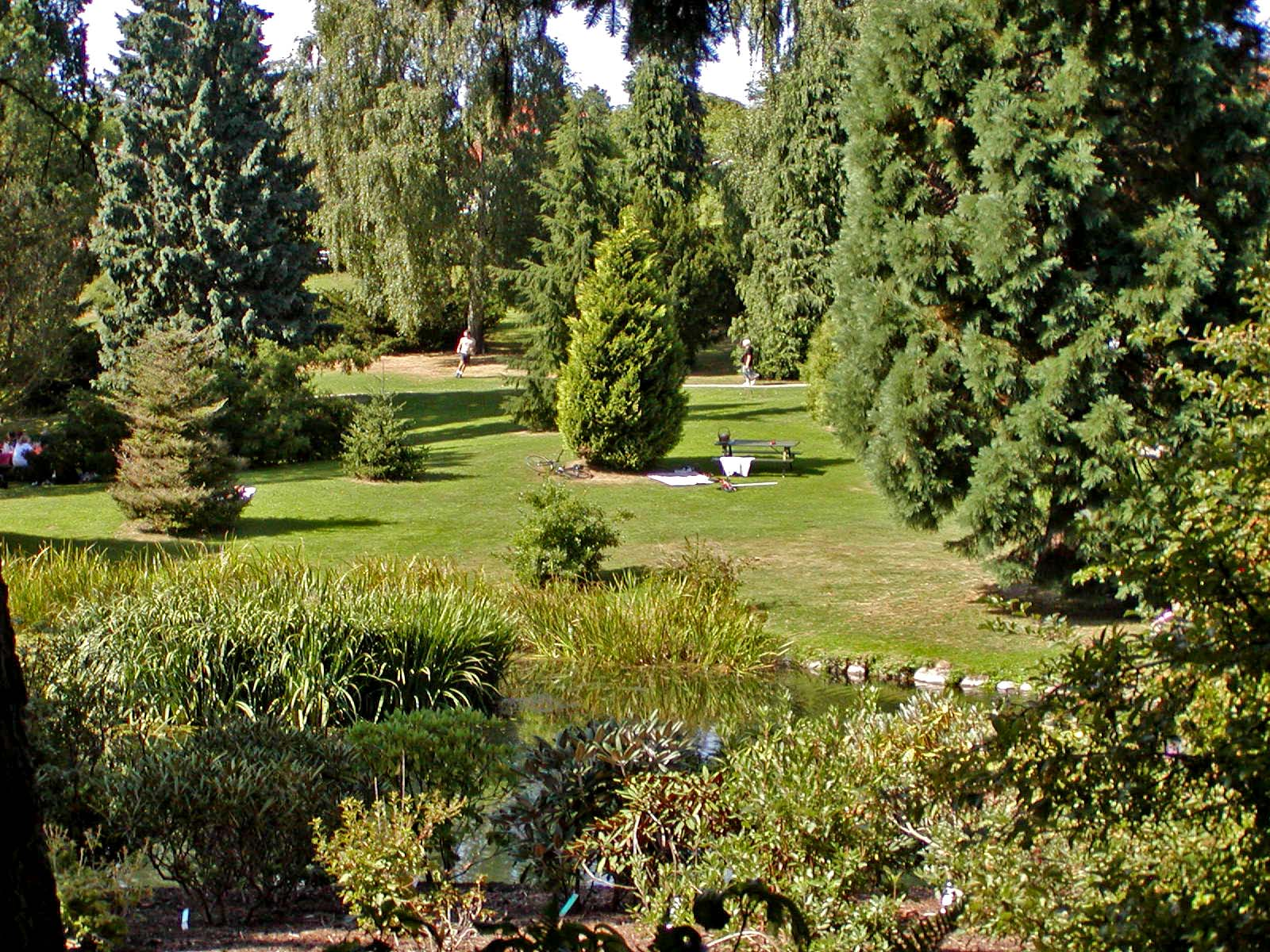
- Interactive map of Aarhus Botanical Gardens
- Type: City park, decommissioned botanical garden
- Location: Aarhus, Denmark
- Coordinates: 56°09′38″N 10°11′27″E
- Area: 0.2 km^{2} (0.077 sq mi)
- Created: 1873
- Operator: Aarhus Municipality, Aarhus University and an NGO
- Open: All year
- Status: Protected green space

Aarhus Botanical Gardens is a central park in Aarhus, Denmark. It is located north of the Old Town open-air village museum and was founded in 1873. Nowadays it covers an area of 21.5 hectares (53 acres), with 5 hectares (12 acres) for the Old Town.

As the name implies, the park formerly served as a botanical garden in relation to Aarhus University, and it still provides an attraction of interest to those who wish to inspect the thousands of plant species on display here. Many plants are still labelled in both Latin and Danish. The landscape is quite varied and includes a large greenhouse center; originally from 1970 by C. F. Møller Architects, but with a newly added tropical hothouse. The gardens have an open-air amphitheatre, three small ponds, a children's playground and the large lawns are popular with picnics, gatherings and events of all kinds year round.

The greenhouses was heavily renovated from 2011 to late 2014 and a large tropical dome was added, amongst other facilities. The project was budgeted at 65 million DKK and realized in a cooperation between Aarhus Municipality, Aarhus University and Realdania, with C. F. Møller Architects as architectural designers.

== Budget cuts, change of status and the future ==
Aarhus municipality found large parts of the botanical gardens too expensive in upkeep and manpower for several years. It was decided to stop the upkeep of the large rose gardens and the arboretum at one point and thereby end the park's status as a botanical garden, but civil protests postponed the city council's decisions for some years. In 2011, a group of citizens founded the non-governmental organization "Botanisk Haves Venner" (Friends of the Botanical Gardens) and since 2012, they are now in charge of the daily chores of maintaining the rose gardens and arboretum, working for free. Aarhus University also took over part of the responsibility from Aarhus Municipality, through the Science Museums which operates the greenhouses. Both the gardens and greenhouses, have changed their status and function from a scientific study ground to a place for recreational activities, public outreach and education.

As plans went on, and the adjacent open-air museum expanded into the botanical garden, civil protests pushed for a protection of the park's green space in 2014, and in May 2018, the area was given permanent protection on a national level. The protection does not include the specific content of the botanical gardens, only its physical green space area and high biodiversity.

== Gallery ==
Facilities

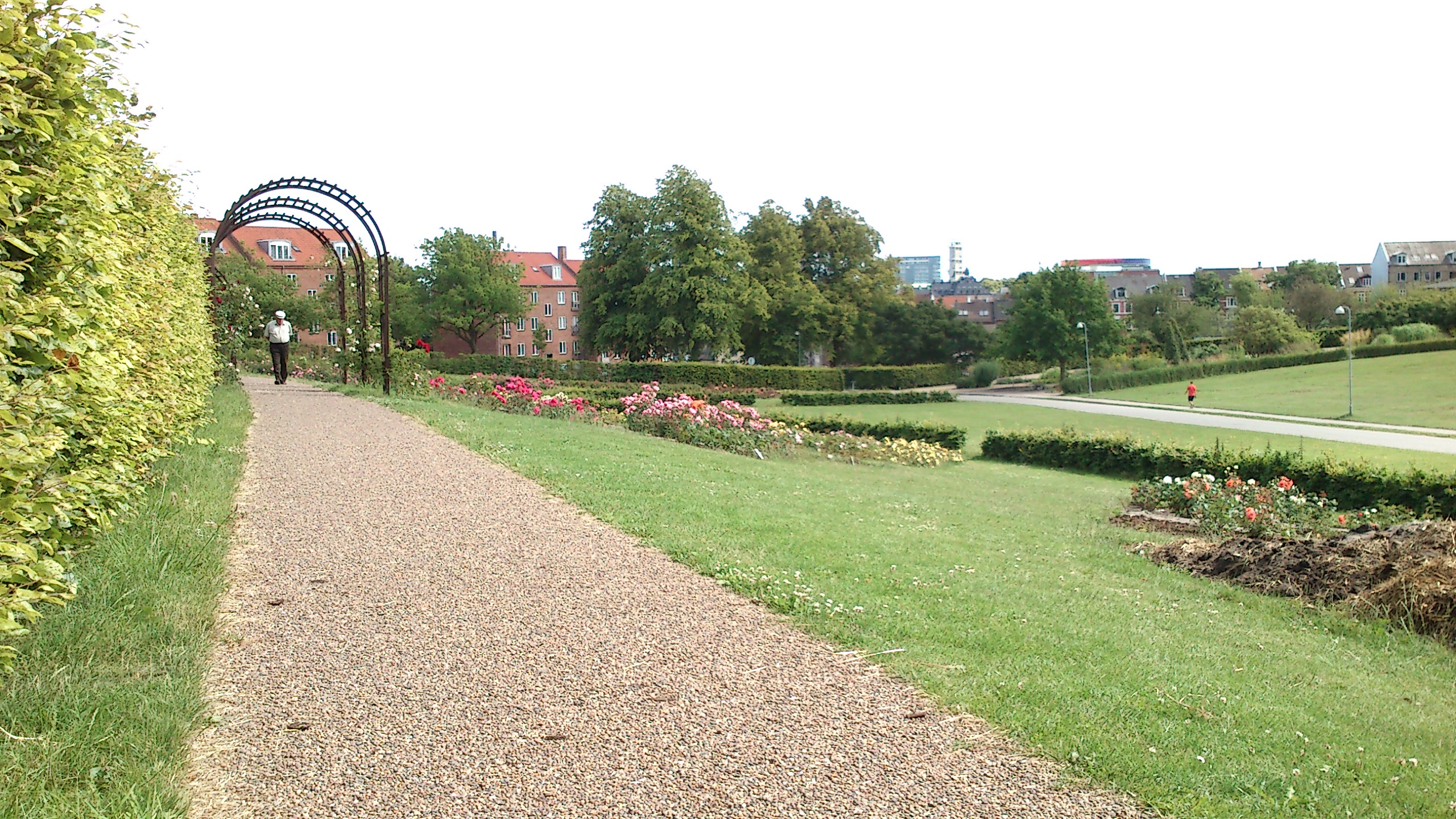
The flowervalley

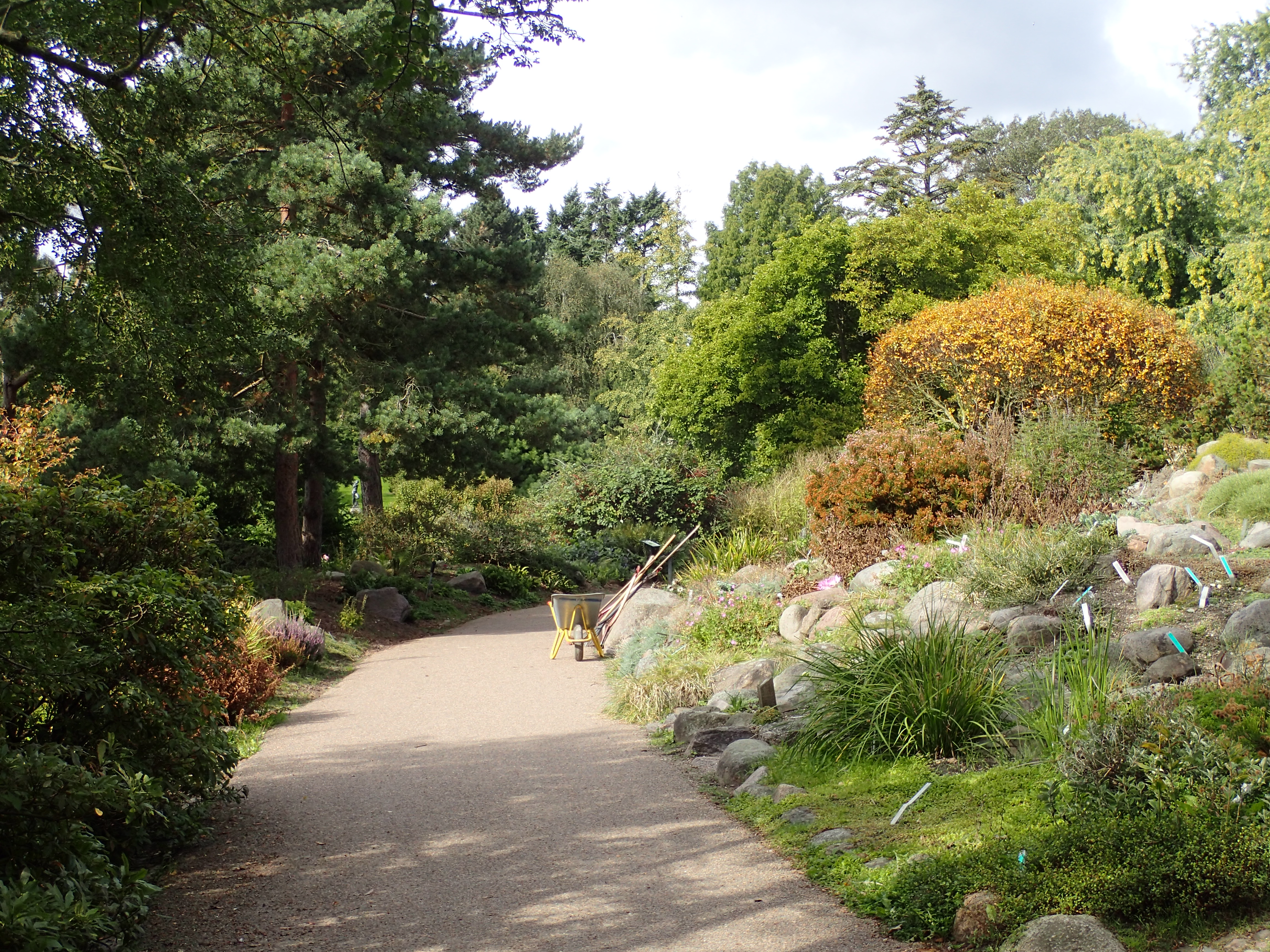
The rockeries

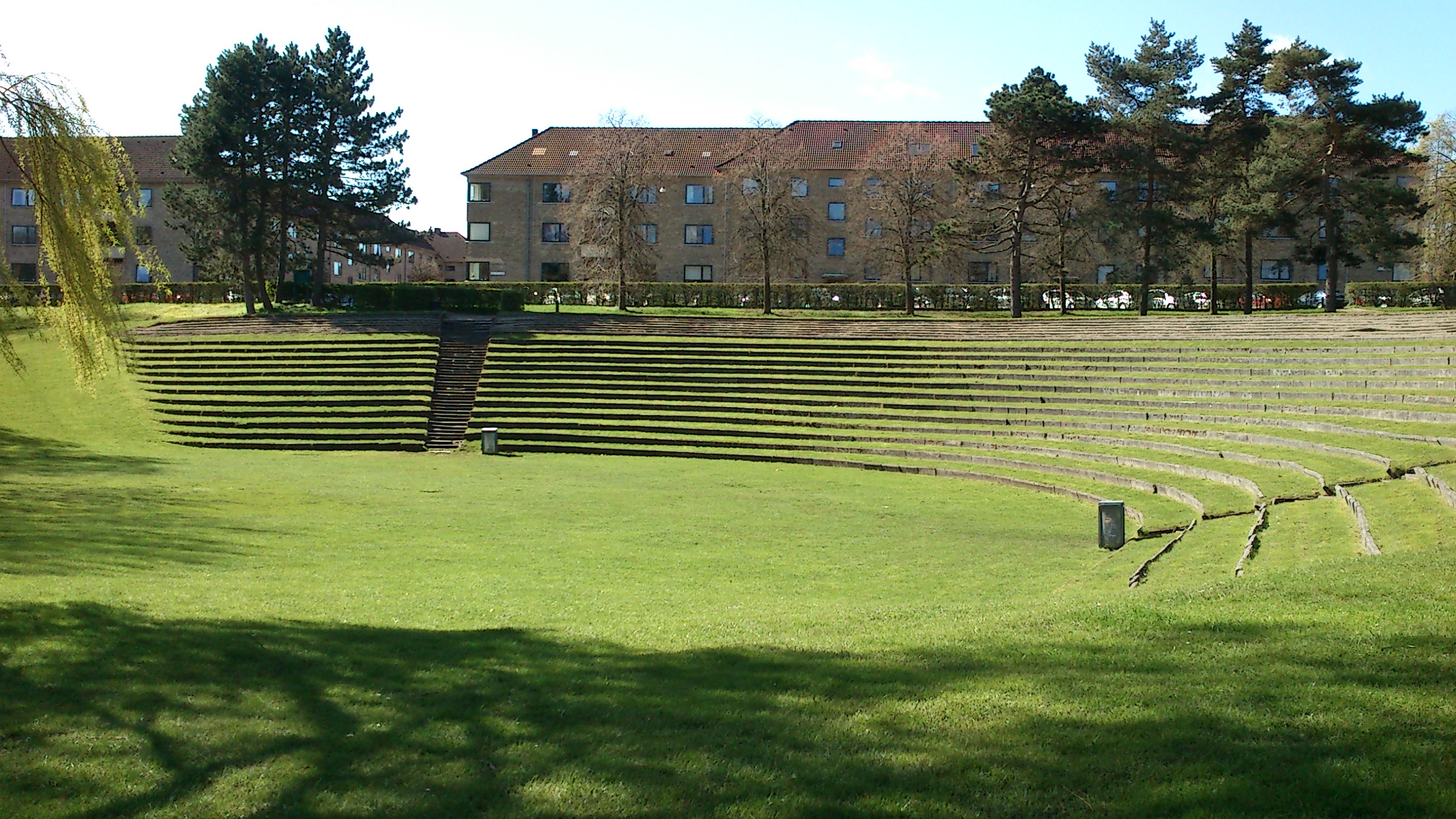
The amphitheatre

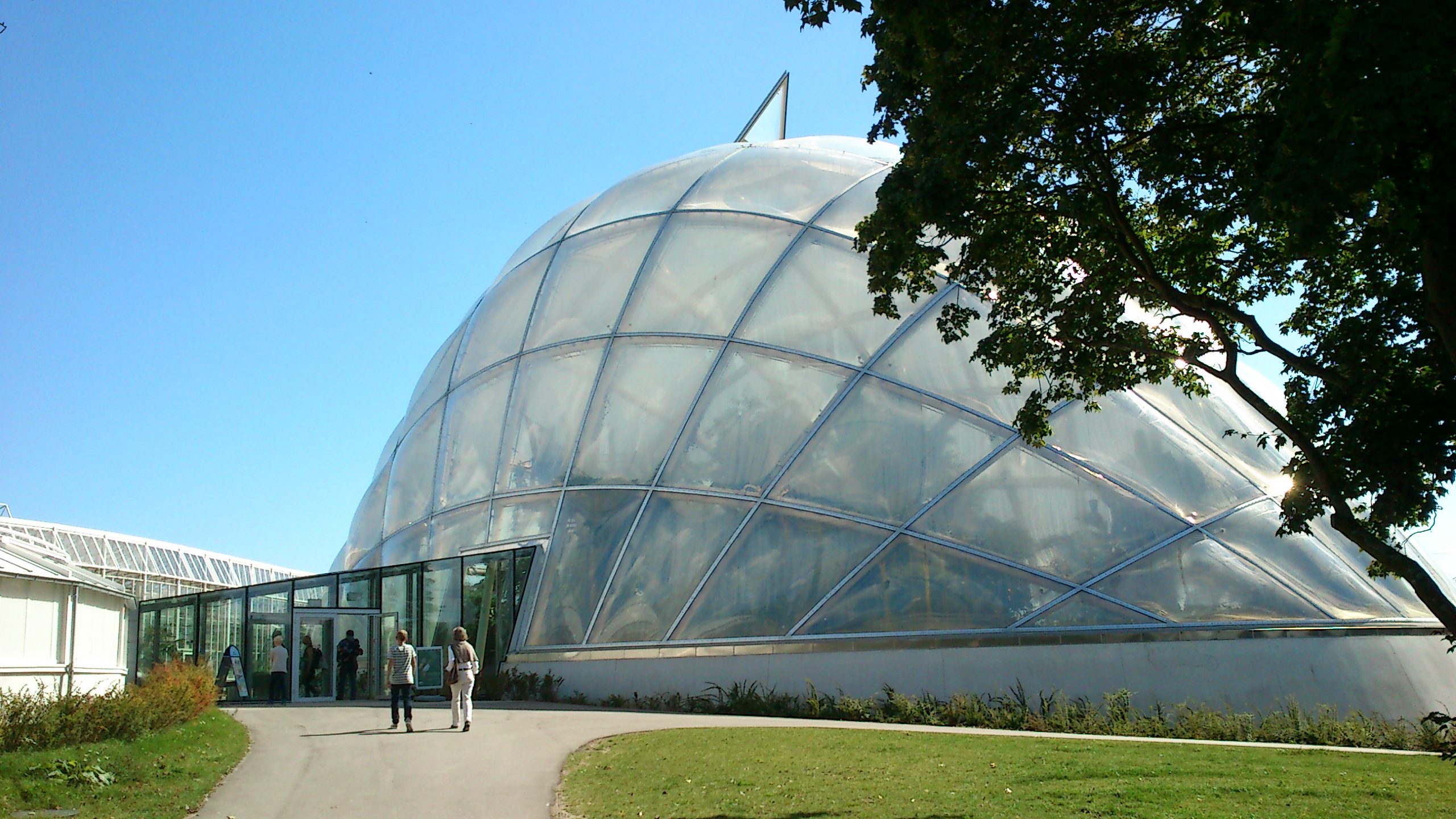
Entrance to the greenhouses

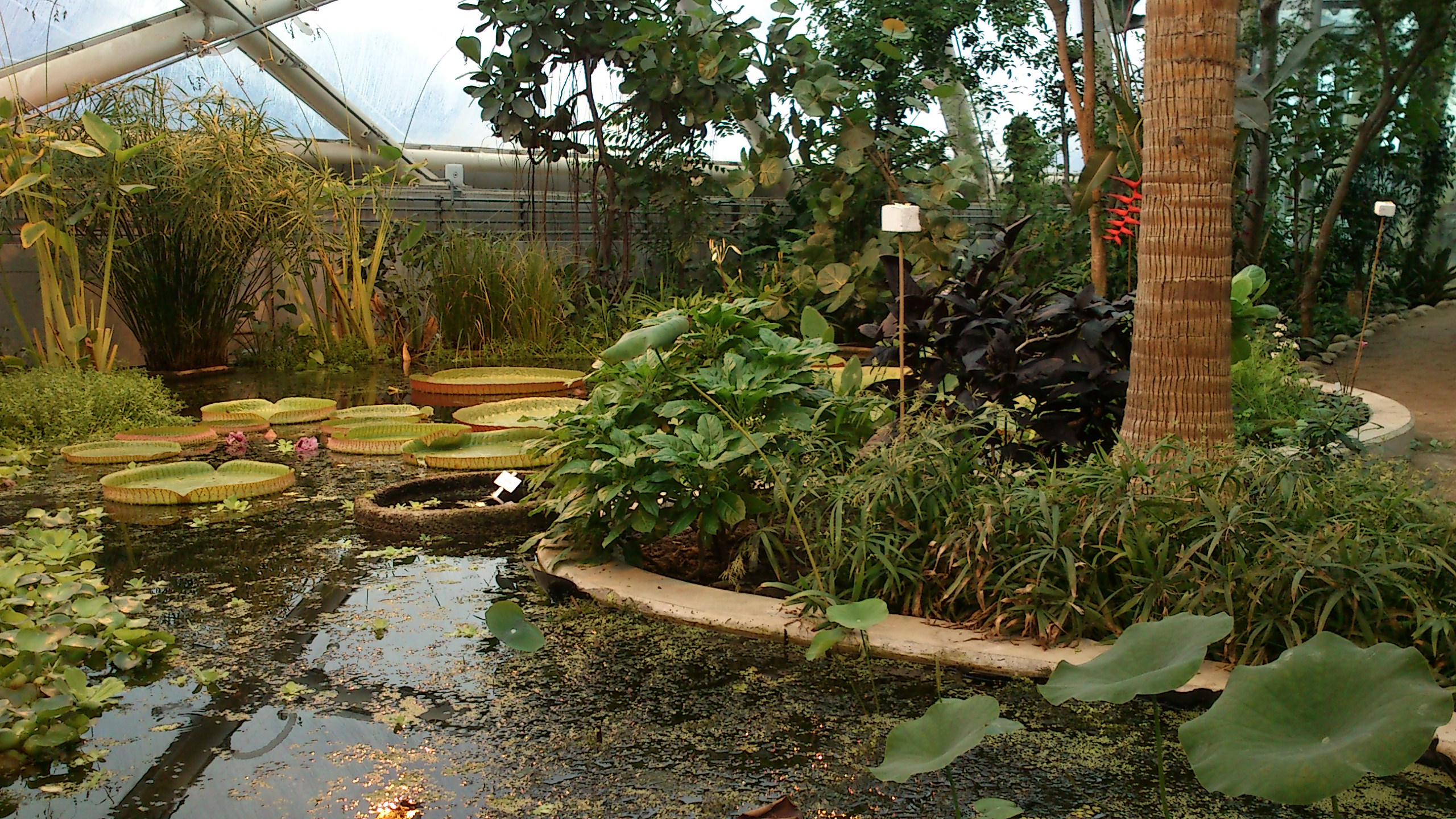
From the greenhouses

From the park

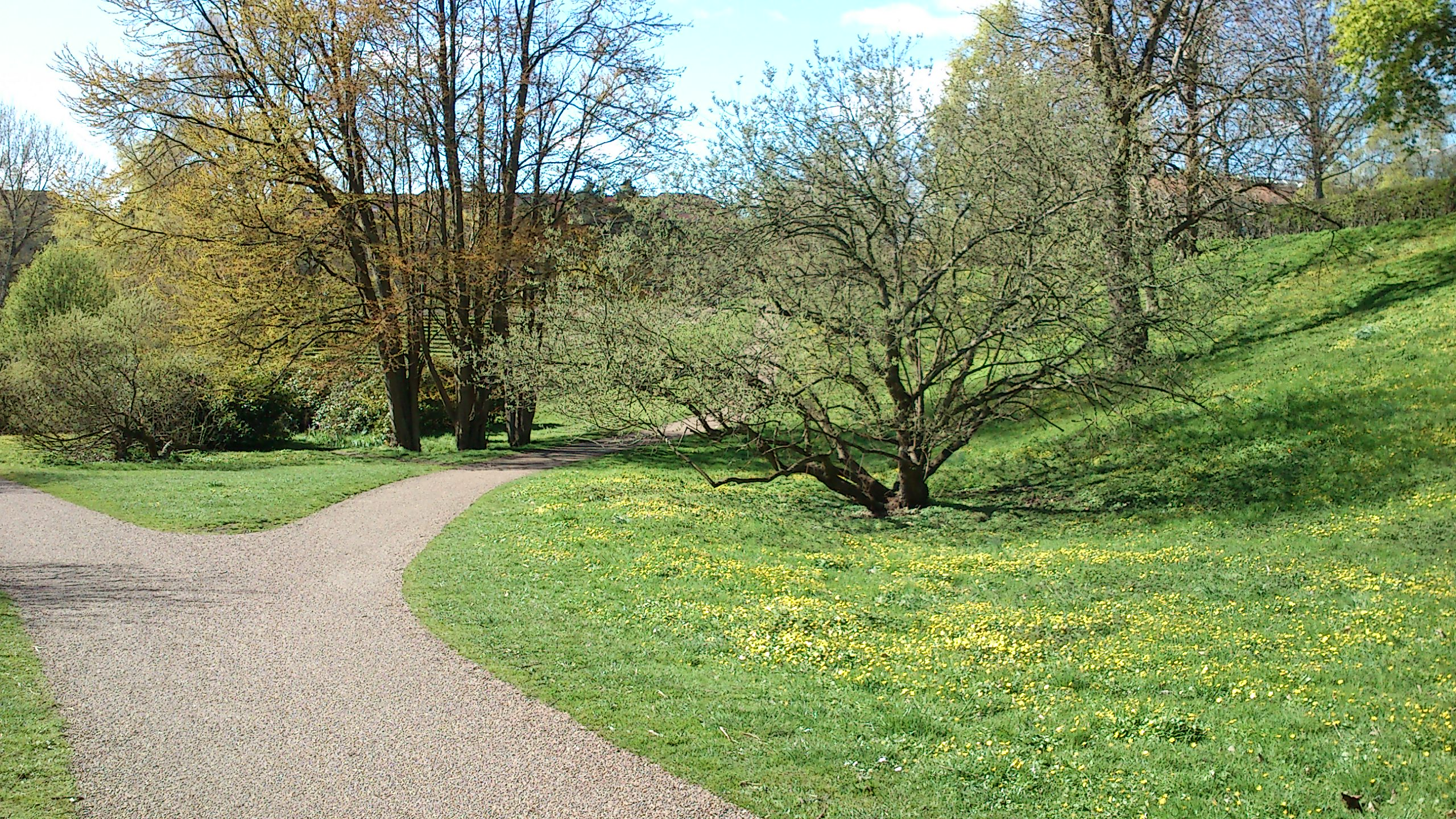
Spring

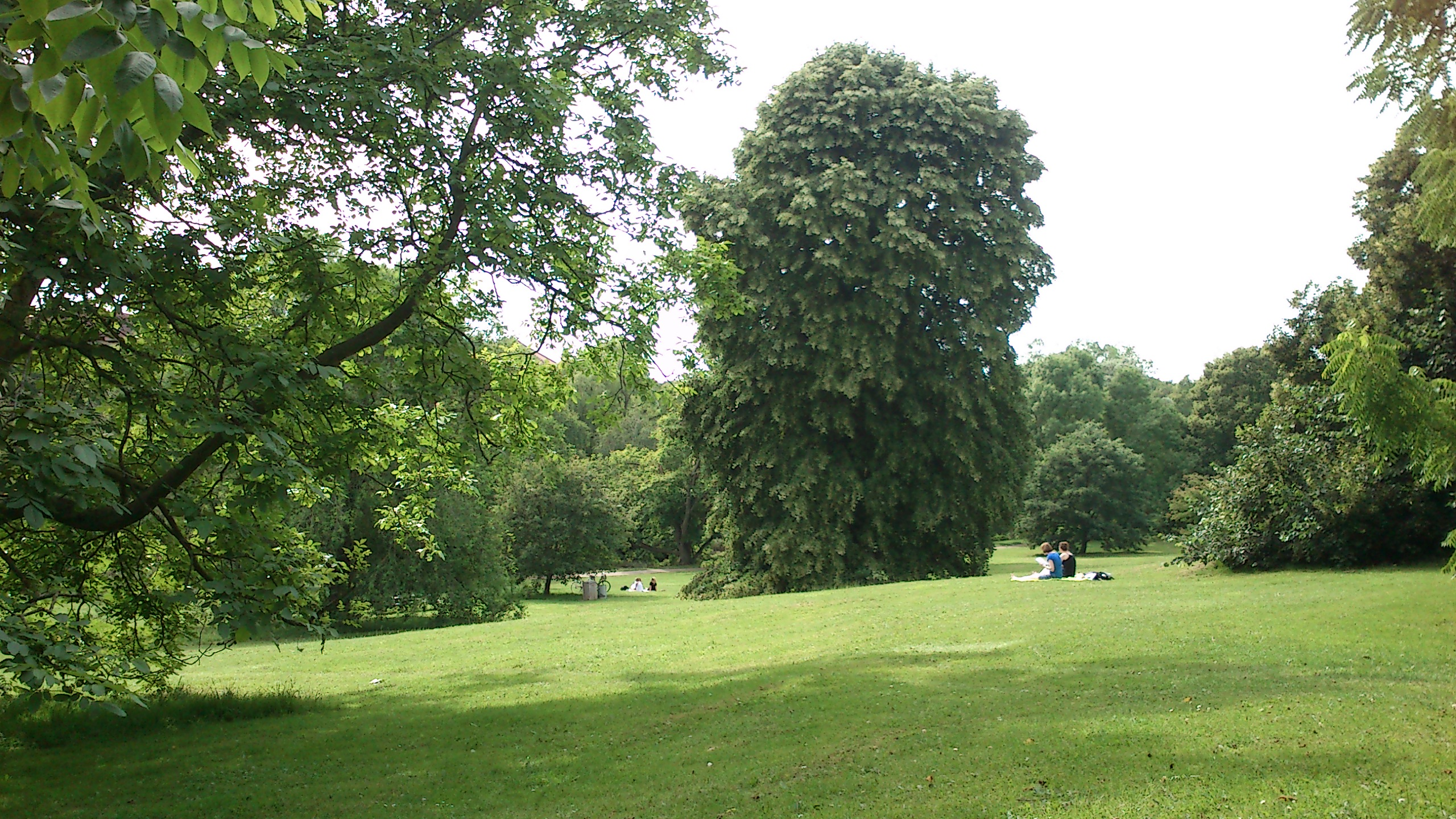
Summer

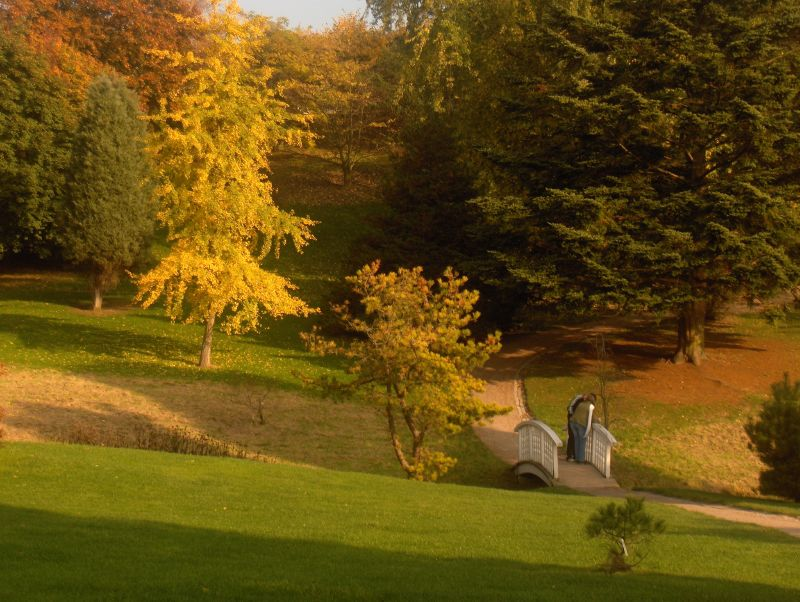
Autumn

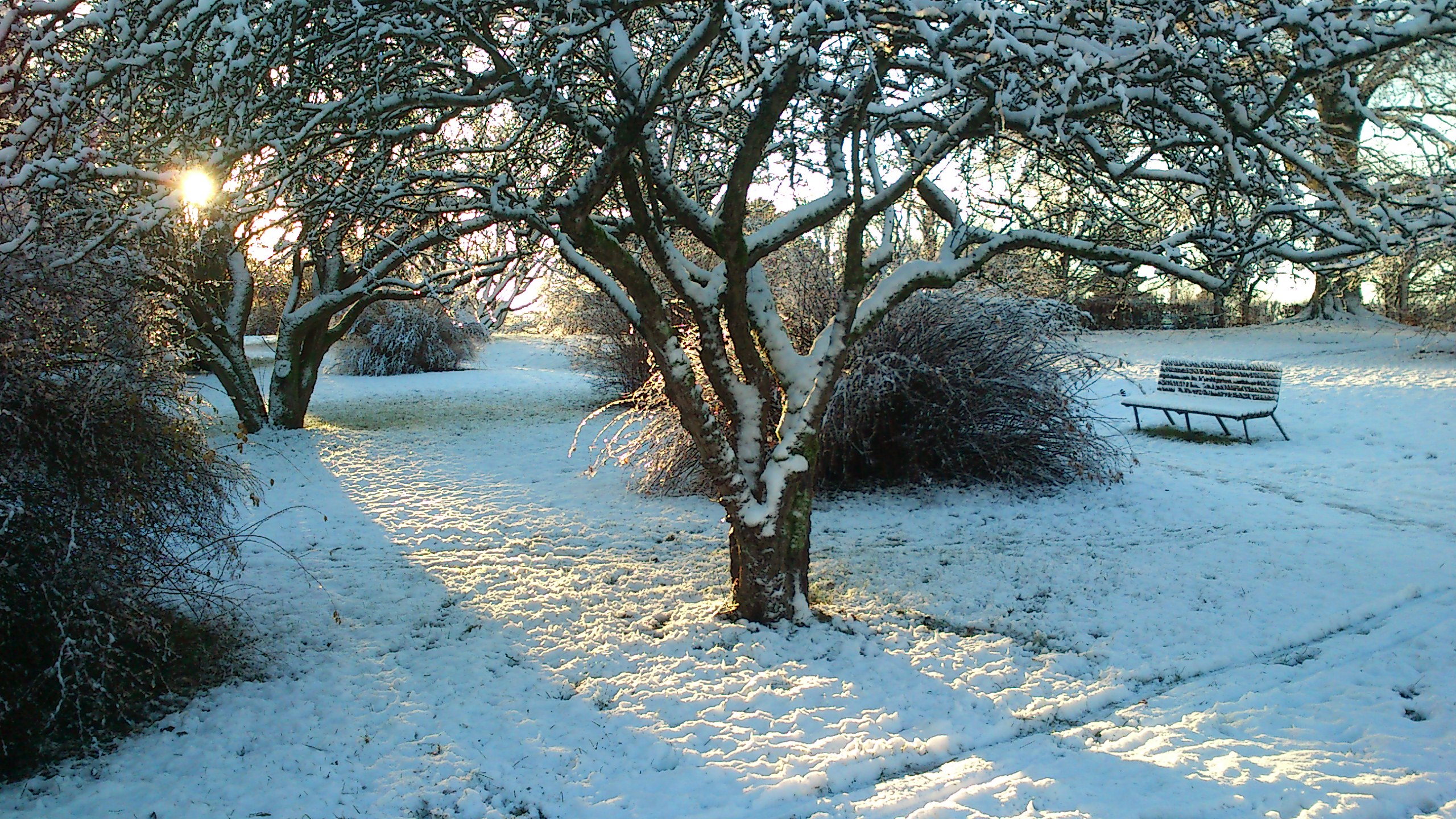
Winter

== Sources ==
- Sustainable Hothouse Architectural company C.F. Møller
- Aarhus Botanical Gardens Aarhus Municipality (in Danish)
- Success with volunteers maintaining beds in The Botanical Garden Aarhus Municipality (2013) (in Danish)
