= Den Gamle By =

The Old Town
- Den Gamle By
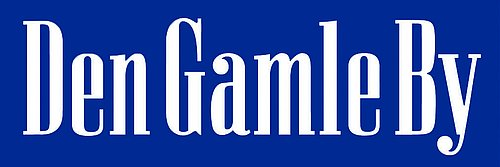
- Logo, made to resemble a street name sign

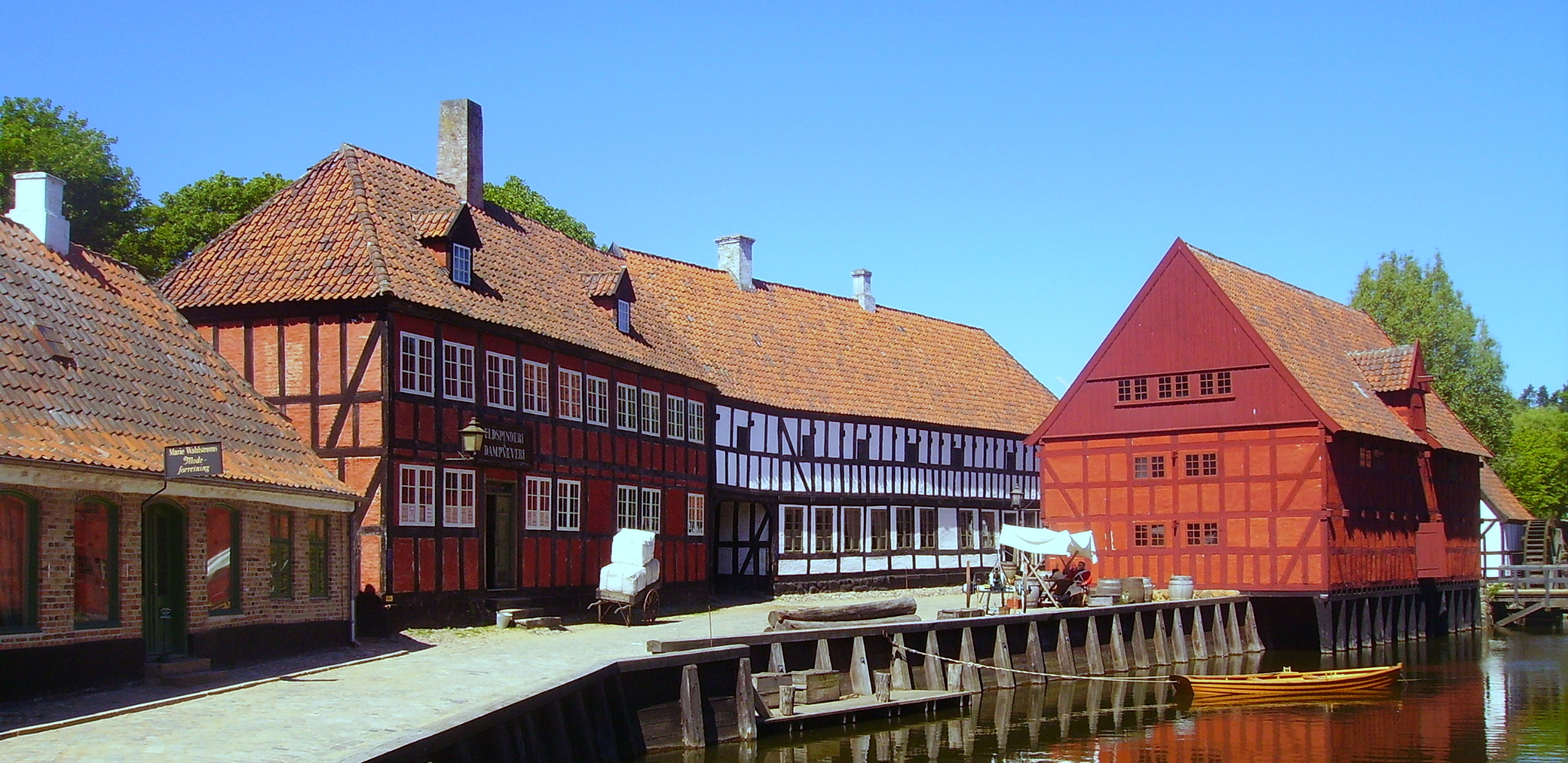
- The Old Town. View from the lakeside.
- Former name: The Old Mayor's House
- Established: July 23, 1919
- Location: Viborgvej 2 Aarhus, Denmark
- Coordinates: 56.159°N 10.191°E
- Type: Open-air museum
- Visitors: More than 400,000
- Founder: Peter Holm
- Director: Thomas Bloch Ravn
- Website: Official Website

Den Gamle By (lit. "The Old Town") is an open-air town museum located in the Aarhus Botanical Gardens, in central Aarhus, Denmark. In 1914, the museum opened as the Denmark's first open-air museum of its kind, concentrating on town culture rather than village culture, and to this day it remains one of just a few top rated Danish museums outside Copenhagen, serving more than 400,000 visitors pr. year. Today the museum consists of 75 historical buildings collected from 20 townships in all parts of the country. The town itself is the main attraction but most buildings are open for visitors; rooms are either decorated in the original historical style or organized into larger exhibits of which there are 5 regular with varying themes.

The museum buildings are organized into a small town of chiefly half-timbered structures originally erected between 1550 and the late 19th century in various parts of the country and later moved to Aarhus during the 20th century. In all there are some 27 rooms, chambers or kitchens, 34 workshops, 10 groceries or shops, 5 historical gardens, a post office, a customs office, a school and a theatre. There are several groceries, diners and workshops spread throughout the town with museum staff working in the roles of town figures i.e. merchant, blacksmith etc. adding to the illusion of a "living" town.

== History ==
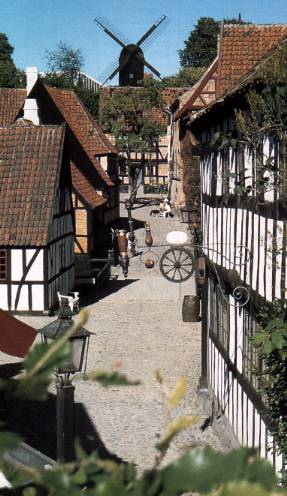
View across parts of The Old Town

In 1914 the Old Town was first opened to the public under the name "The Old Mayor's House". Apart from the renaissance-styled Mayor's House, there were a small garden pavilion and another large renaissance-styled house, all originally from the city of Aarhus. Over the course of the following half century the museum was slowly expanded as more buildings and collections from several parts of the country were donated or acquired.

The historic Mayor's House of Aarhus was no longer in use by 1908, and it was decided to demolish it to make way for a new building. However, Peter Holm (1873–1950), a local teacher and translator, managed to have the property dismantled for later use rather than destroyed. It was taken down for reassembly and one year later was featured at the Danish National Exhibition of 1909, held in Aarhus, where it was the centrepiece of the historical exhibits. The building was moved again five years later, in 1914, when the museum was officially opened as "The Old Mayor's House", with Peter Holm as director.

Almost fifteen years later in 1923, Peter Holm was notified by the National Museum that a large merchant mansion in Aalborg was to be demolished. Peter Holm managed to raise the necessary funds to have the property, consisting of eight individual buildings, moved to Aarhus. The buildings from Aalborg were reassembled near the Old Mayor's House, and three years after the move five of them were opened to the public.

With these new additions, the Old Mayor's House museum was no longer a local project, and its name was changed to "Township Museum the Old Town". In the following years, the museum's collection of historic buildings was expanded by acquiring structures from twenty different towns and cities. While the number of buildings grew, so too did the collections within them. Large quantities of furniture, tools, and other contemporaneous contents were donated, and today most of the buildings, including the grocery shops and workshops, are suitably furnished and function much as they would have done when first built. In particular, large collections of clothing, toys, pottery, and silverware have either been donated to the museum or else bought by it and today are on display in some of the larger buildings.

Peter Holm remained as director of the museum for 31 years, from 1914 to 1945, when he resigned. During this period he managed to save some fifty historic buildings from destruction and raised the funds to have them moved to and erected in Aarhus; a unique and impressive feat in Danish museum history.

The museum's name was changed again in 1995 to "The Old Town. Township Museum of Denmark."

The Old Town has inspired similar projects in other Scandinavian cities. Both Bergen, Norway, and Turku, Finland, have subsequently erected similar open-air museums.

== Buildings ==
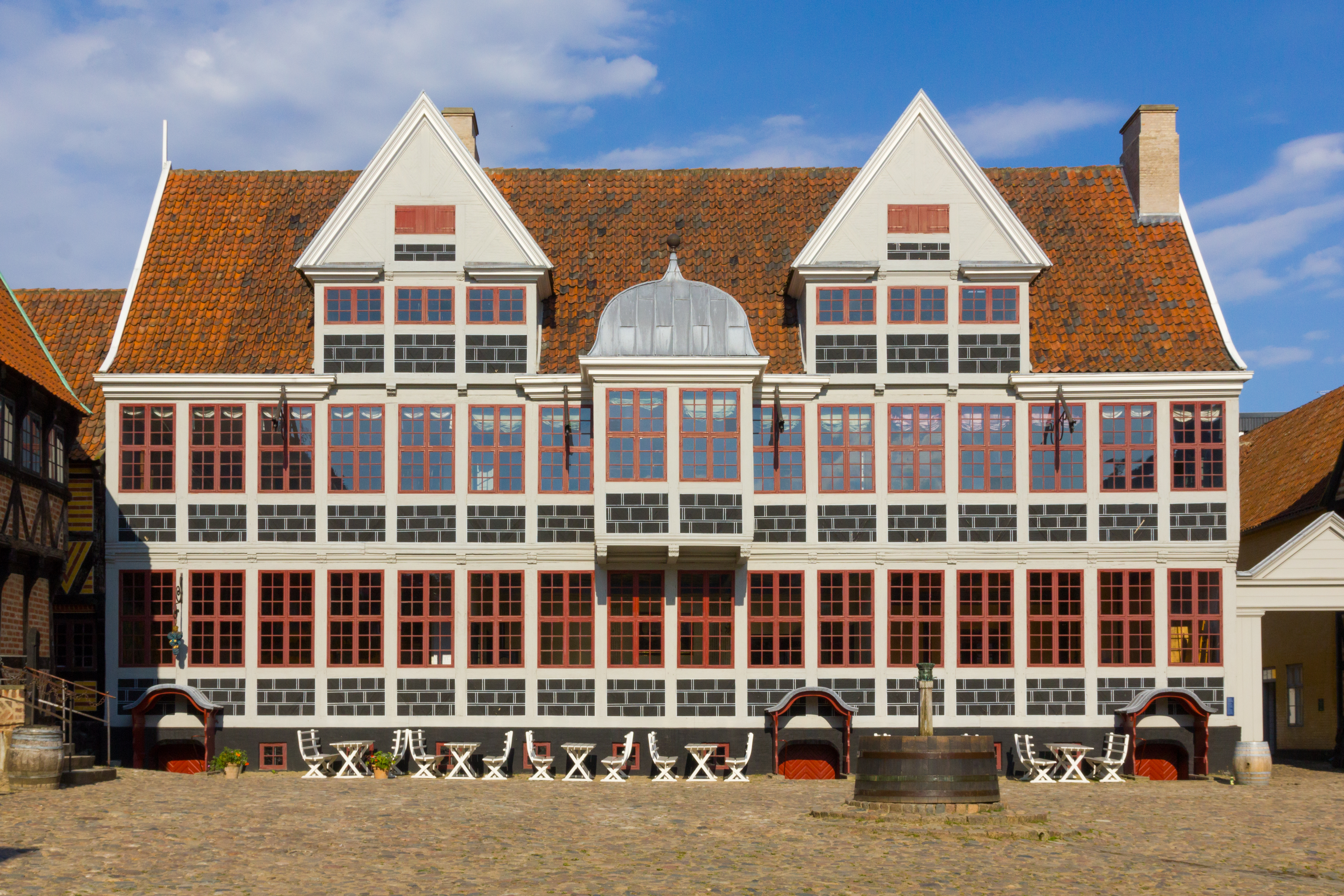
The Coin Master's Mansion. Reconstructed in 1998-2009.

The Old Town features a total of 75 buildings from 20 Danish towns while another three are in storage awaiting later reconstruction. The oldest structure is a storage house from Aalborg from c. 1550 and the youngest is a garden pavilion from the 1909 Country Exhibit in Aarhus. The majority of the structures are from the mid 18th to early 19th centuries in typical half-timbered Renaissance style.

The largest and most impressive buildings are the Coin Master's Mansion from Copenhagen (c. 1683), the Mayor's House from Aarhus (c. 1597), a merchant's house from Aarhus (c. 1723) and the Aalborg Estate from Aalborg (c. 1570 and 1807). Many smaller buildings of diverse persuasions are scattered around the site, ranging from ordinary residences to a small dock for boat construction, a tobacco barn, several watermills and a windmill.

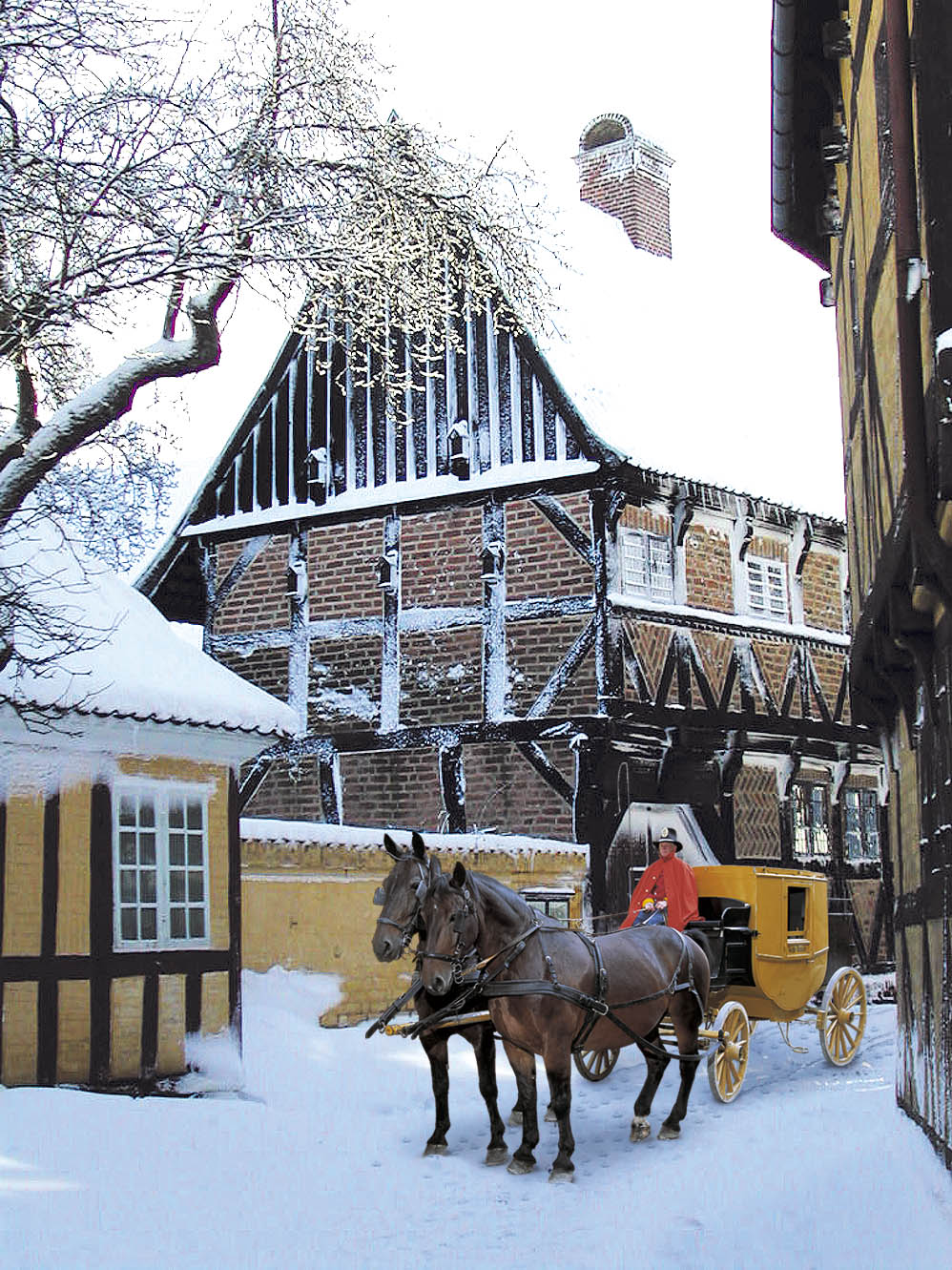
Snowfall in The Old Town. Horse carriages carry visitors around occasionally.

The most recent addition to the museum town was the half-timbered Coin Master's Mansion (Møntmestergården). It was erected as a residence for the royal coin masters in Copenhagen by Gregorius Sessemann in c. 1683 and was used for this purpose until 1749. The Copenhagen City Museum disassembled the building in 1944 and in 1995 it was handed over to The Old Town who initiated its reconstruction in 1998, finishing in 2009. The Coin Master's Mansion was reconstructed as it is believed to have presented itself in 1750 and the interior was furnished accordingly, using methods and materials true to this period.

The Mayor's House is one of the most significant Danish half-timbered Renaissance buildings with many unique architectural features. It was the first building in The Old Town and is still one of the central pieces in the town. The Mayor's House now contains a cavalcade of common city culture from 1600 to 1850. Original located at Lilletorv (Lesser square) at the corner of Vestergade and Immervad at the site of present-day department store Magasin du Nord.

The merchant's mansion from Aarhus is the main parts of a large mansion originally at Brobjerg Port later named Frederiks Port, the city gate at the end of Frederiksgade. At the city boundary at the time, now opposite the present day city hall. The mansion was rebuilt in The Old Town in 1942. Facing the street there is a grocery, residential wing and large grain storage in the attic and the stable and garden are situated in the back. The merchant's mansion is now home to one of the regular exhibits in the museum, The Merchant Mansion of 1864.

The Aalborg Estate consists of five buildings, two from c. 1570, one from c. 1585, one from c. 1634 and one from c. 1807. The complex was part of the same merchant's estate in central Aalborg and was rebuilt in The Old Town in 1926 and 1934 and one building now doubles as a brewery.

== Exhibits ==
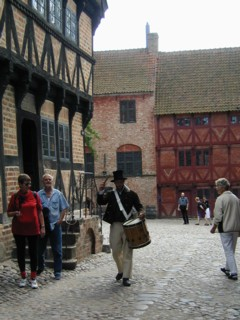
Museum staff members dress up in historical authentic clothing. Sometimes roleplays are acted out.

There are 5 regular exhibits, The Danish Clock Museum, the Toy Museum, a silverware exhibit, a pottery exhibit and the Textile Museum, in addition to several smaller exhibits. Besides the town itself, these exhibitions form the centrepiece of the museum and contain some of the largest collections of historical artefacts outside Copenhagen. In addition to the regular exhibits the museum holds several special themed exhibits every year with artefacts borrowed from other Danish, and in some cases Scandinavian, cities

The Toy Museum is situated in the large warehouse from Næstved and contains some 6000 pieces of toys from the 19th century to the 1960s. On the ground floor most boy's toys are displayed including German Märklin cars and Bing trains, mechanical toys from Lehmann, Danish Tekno toys and a somewhat unusual feature - wooden toys produced by inmates of Danish prisons.

The first floor focuses on the pedagogical use of toys. In the 18th century childhood was increasingly recognized as a special period in a human's life whereas it had earlier perceived as a necessary and difficult period needed to be overcome on the path to becoming a "real" person. In the late 18th century philosophers, doctors and teachers more and more viewed childhood as an important time where parents could influence the child in positive directions. To this end toys became an important tool. It was believed that by giving a child a specific toy it could be led in a specific direction in later life i.e. influence girls to become good housewives and boys to an active, social existence bound for the commercial life of the 19th and 20th centuries.

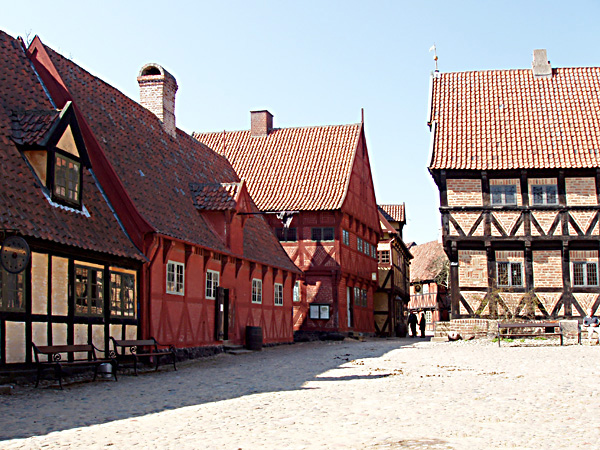
At the central cobbled town square

The Danish Clock Museum showcases a fully equipped watch makers shop with workshops for tower watchmaker and ordinary watchmakers. The museum has a large collection of Danish and foreign clocks and watches and shows the development from sun dials and hour glasses to mechanical clocks. The earliest clocks from the 16th century had only one hand to show the hour of the day but later and more sophisticated clocks showed time in fractions of a second and the position of planets.

The textile museum is essentially spread out over the entire town. The exhibits aims at telling the story of the use of textiles in the home i.e. the introduction of curtains and sofa cushions. During the 19th century a tendency to hide furniture behind textiles erupted. Towels were hidden behind embroidered linen and the stove was hidden behind an embroidered textile screen and in the 1890s the average home resembled a box excessively lined with coloured curtains, screens and linen. The functionalism of the 1920s was a rebellion against this tendency. The Mayor's House showcases the tendencies of 250 years of interior decoration.

The silverware exhibit details the development of design and fabrication in the silver industry of the 17th century from baroque to functionalism. The collection includes works of 310 smiths from 44 different cities and towns with works of Niels Christensen as the oldest (c. 1637) and Henning Koppel, a pupil of Georg Jensen, as the most recent (1918).

== Gardens ==
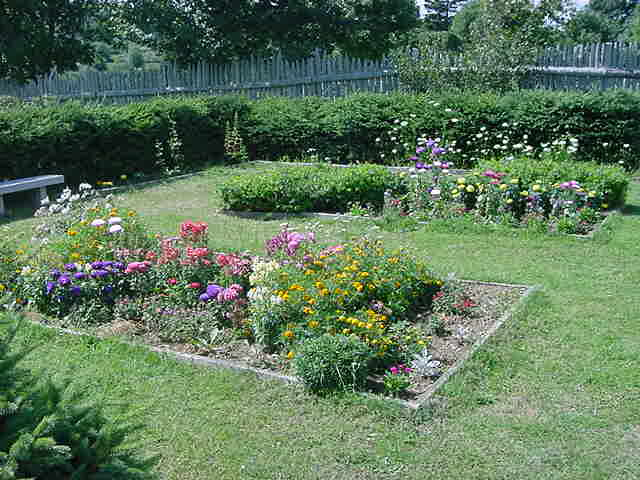
Part of Ms. Wahlstrøm's renaissance garden

There are five gardens in the museum representing various periods in time from the mid 17th to the early 20th centuries ranging from simple recreational hobby gardens to greeneries for commercial use.

The Pharmacy Garden c. 1750 is 300 m^{2}. and has been constructed around a small house from the 1750s. The garden is designed in the Baroque style with 91 squares each containing one type of flowering plant all of which has been used for medical purposes in the mid-1750s including henbane, thorn apple, mistletoe, hop, belladonna, blue anemones and aniseed.

Commercial Greenery Bernstoff is a greenery which grows flowers, plants and spices to be sold on the local town market. The large greenhouse from Bernstorff Palace contains the exhibit "Great Grandmothers Plants" during the summer. The collection of pelargonium is particularly large including 20-30 different species.

Ms. Wahlstrøm's garden of 1920 is a small garden and a part of the Lemvig House reconstructed in The Old Town in 1982. The house was originally used by a single woman who lived in the house and worked in the adjoining shop. The 700 m^{2} garden remains as it looked originally and is largely grass with a small corner used for growing herbs, salads etc. The garden is framed by European honeysuckle, lavender, old roses species, common lilac, lilies, summer flowers and fruit trees.

The residential garden of 1864 contains a functional kitchen garden and a typical garden for recreational purposes in the upper classes of the mid 19th century. The central part of the garden is composed of a large round section with columbine, larkspur, dianthus and red valerian in addition to numerous other plants and flowers typical of this time. The kitchen garden is separated from the recreational garden and contains typical vegetables and herbs in addition to many lesser known plants not commonly used today.

The Renaissance garden of 1647 is part of the Mayor's House created and was created on the basis of the book Horticultura Danica by Hans Rasmussen Block in 1647. It is a small garden measuring 6 by 7 metres surrounded by a red painted fence containing tulips, snake's head and forget-me-nots orchestrated in strong Renaissance style.

== Activities ==
Spread throughout the small town, six shops including a bookstore, a post office and a bakery contribute to the appearance of a town. In addition, five diners and cafés serve visitors, and double as miniature exhibits showcasing historical work methods.

== See also ==
- Frilandsmuseet
- The Funen Village
- Open-air museum

== Sources ==
- The Old Town Web Portal
- The City of Aarhus Web Portal
- The Official Tourist Portal of Aarhus
- Aarhus History in Photos and Text
- Aarhus University and The Old Town Collaborative History Project
- Digital City Portal -History of old cities in Denmark
- Den Klassiske Købstad (ISBN 87-7934-150-0)
- Middelalderbyen (ISBN 87-7934-094-6)
