= Henning Stærk =

Danish singer and musical-performer (born 1949)

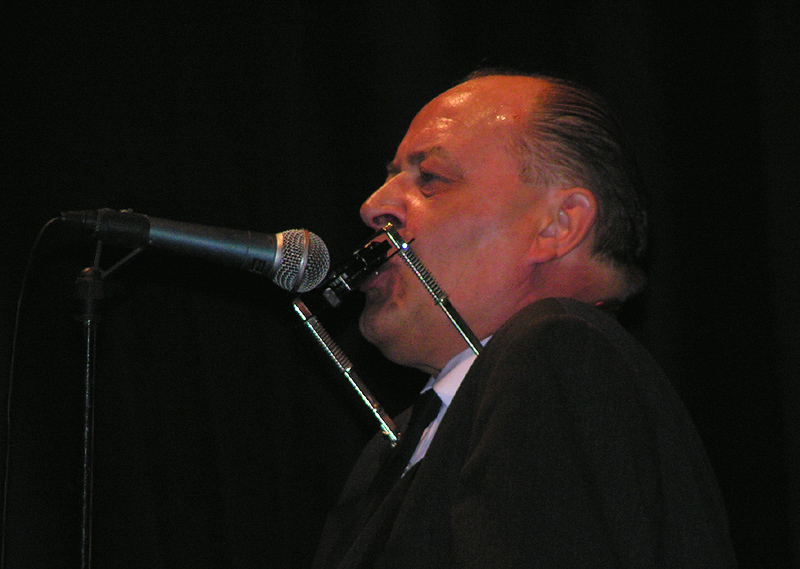
- Henning Stærk during a performance

Background information
- Born: 20 March 1949 (age 77)
- Origin: Holstebro, Denmark
- Genres: Alternative, pop rock
- Instrument: Singing
- Years active: 1965–present
- Website: Official website

Henning Stærk (born 20 March 1949) is a Danish singer and musical-performer. Henning Stærk was born in Holstebro on 20 March 1949. He started his musical career in Holstebro but later moved to Aarhus where he became involved in the local music scene.

Henning Stærk started singing with his childhood friend Palle Thy Christensen but was quickly contacted by the local rhythm´n´blues band Beat Stones. The band debuted on 18 September 1965 and was renamed to Road Runners. The band dissolved around one year later and several members moved to Holstebro's leading band The Poisons, which in 1967 became number two in a music competition. In 1967 the band published the single "Reach out I´ll be there // Call my name". The group played together until 1969 when Stærk and two other band members created the group Chapter Three.

In 1970 Stærk moved to Aarhus and the band was dissolved. Instead Stærk joined the group Jackie Boo Flight which published two albums in the period 1970 to 1975. Simultaneously Stærk ented the law school at the University of Aarhus and in 1973 passed the first exams. Stærk subsequently dedicated himself to music and quit the studies. From 1973 to 1977 he was singer, bassist, guitarist and drummer in Spillemændene In 1977 he became a member of the band Gnags in which he played drums, harmonica and sang until late 1981. In 1980 Stærk started his own band in which he plays the vocals and drums. In 1981 he recorded the debut single Henning Stærk. IN the early 2000s he toured with Henning Stærk Trio and in 2004 he published the CD "Stærk" on his own record label.

== Activism ==
In the 1970s and 1980s Stærk actively participated in the organization of the local music scene in Aarhus. Stærk co-founded Musikernes Hus (Musicians' House) in Vestergade 58. He also helped create Århus Musikkontor and in the late 1970s he was a member of the board of Dansk Musikerforbund.

== Studio albums ==
- Henning Stærk (1981)
- One Nite Stand (1984) (as Henning Stærk Band)
- Soul Feet (1985) (as Henning Stærk Band)
- Tender Touch (1987) (as Henning Stærk Band)
- Dreams To Remember (1989)
- Hard To Handle (1991)
- Small town Saturday Night (1992)
- Whatever Gets You Thru The Night (1994)
- Somewhere Someone´s Falling in Love (1997)
- Let A Man Stand Up (1998)
- hit House (2000)
- Stærk (2004)
- Old Time Rocker (2009)
