= Gnags =

Danish rock band

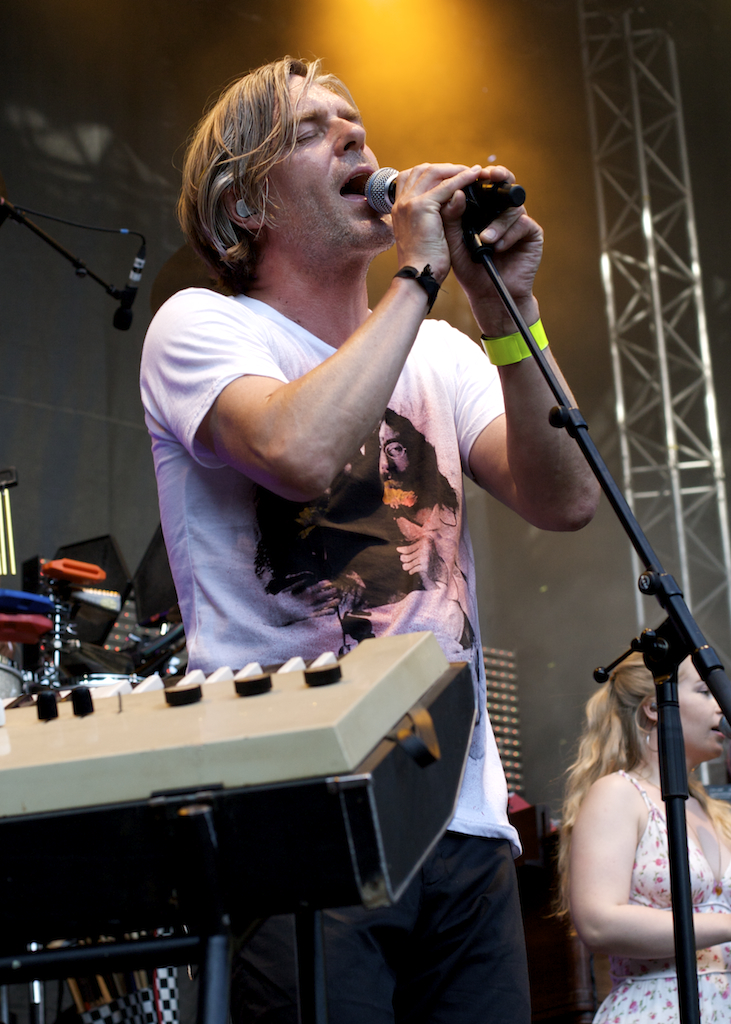
- Photo: Simon Wedege Petersen

Background information
- Origin: Skjern, Denmark
- Genres: Rock
- Years active: 1966–present
- Label: Genlyd
- Members: Peter A.G. Nielsen, Mads Michelsen, Mika Vandborg and Bastian Sjelberg
- Past members: Per Christian Frost; Jens G Nielsen; Sven Fenger; Henning Stærk; Jacob Riis-Olsen; Ivan Oehlenschaeg Sørensen
- Website: http://www.gnags.dk

Gnags is a Danish rock band from Skjern formed by Peter A. G. Nielsen and his brother Jens G. Nielsen in 1966.

== History ==
The band started playing regularly in 1968 after winning the Danish national championship in "beat music". Their championship title paved the way for the band's first two single recordings, "Eyes and Ears" and "I Can't Talk About It Now". Sven Fenger left the band in 1969, after which Gnags continued as a trio, playing Danish festivals and in Amsterdam.

The band moved to Aarhus in 1971 and joined a commune. There they recorded their first album, Paa Vej, which was released in 1973. The band had financed the album out of their own pockets, and they sold the distribution rights to the record producer and musician Johnny Reimar. Struggling to find a record label, Gnags created Genlyd Records in 1974. Ivan Oehlenschaeg Sørensen joined the band in 1973 and Per Christian Frost in 1974. Gnags released their second album, Del af en ring, in 1974.

Gnags created Feedback Studios in 1975, from which most of their subsequent works have been recorded.

Gnags' sales and popularity rose steadily during the 1970s reaching national saturation in the 1980s with albums such as Intercity, Safari and X.

Gnags continues to play and tour after 40 years as a band. Though some members have left over time, the band has maintained a stable membership over the years with only Per Christian Frost, Henning Stærk and Jens G Nielsen leaving in recent history.

In August 2013 the original band members reunited for a concert also celebrating the coincident birthdays of Peter Nielsen (60) and his son (40).

In September 2013, Peter Nielsen began performing a solo performance show.

== Music style ==
Gnags' musical style is unusual. It is clearly rock and roll but stylistically it is dominated by Peter A. G. Nielsen's unmistakable voice. From 1981 to 1983 there was a strong influence from reggae music, which has its origins in their work with producer Jack Nuber. Gnags have recorded almost all their songs in the Danish language. Exceptions are three songs in English: Their singles "Eyes and Ears" and "I Can't Talk About It Now", and the last track on the 1982 album Safari ("American Boy"). Gnags are energetic performers on stage.

== Discography ==
=== Albums ===
- På vej (1973) Philips
- Del af en ring (1975) Genlyd
- Det er det (1976) Genlyd
- La' det gro (1977) Genlyd
- Er du hjemme i aften? (1978) Genlyd
- Burhøns (1979) Genlyd
- Intercity (1980) Genlyd
- Live Vol. 1 (1981 - live recording) Genlyd
- Safari (1982) Genlyd
- X (1983) Genlyd
- Den blå hund (1984) Genlyd
- En underlig fisk (1985) Genlyd
- Plads til begejstring (1986) Genlyd
- Har de puttet noget i kaffen? (1987) Genlyd
- Under bøgen (1988 - Compilation) Genlyd
- Mr. Swing King (1989) Genlyd
- Lygtemandens sang (1991) Genlyd
- Live vol. 2 (1992 - Live recording) Genlyd
- Øjne på stilke (1994) Genlyd
- Gösta Hammerfedt (1996) Genlyd
- Gnags Greatest (1999 - Compilation) Genlyd
- Ridser, Revner og Buler (2000) Genlyd
- Skønhedspletter (2002) Genlyd
- Skitsernes Drøm (2003) Genlyd
- Siden 66 (2005 - Compilation - Box set) Genlyd
- Legepladsen (2008) Genlyd
- Nørd (2017) Sony Music
- Robot’n'Roll (2019) Sony Music
- På ryggen af en drøm (2022) Sony Music
