= Thorald's House =

Coordinates: 56.1934°N 10.1113°E

- Thoralds Hus
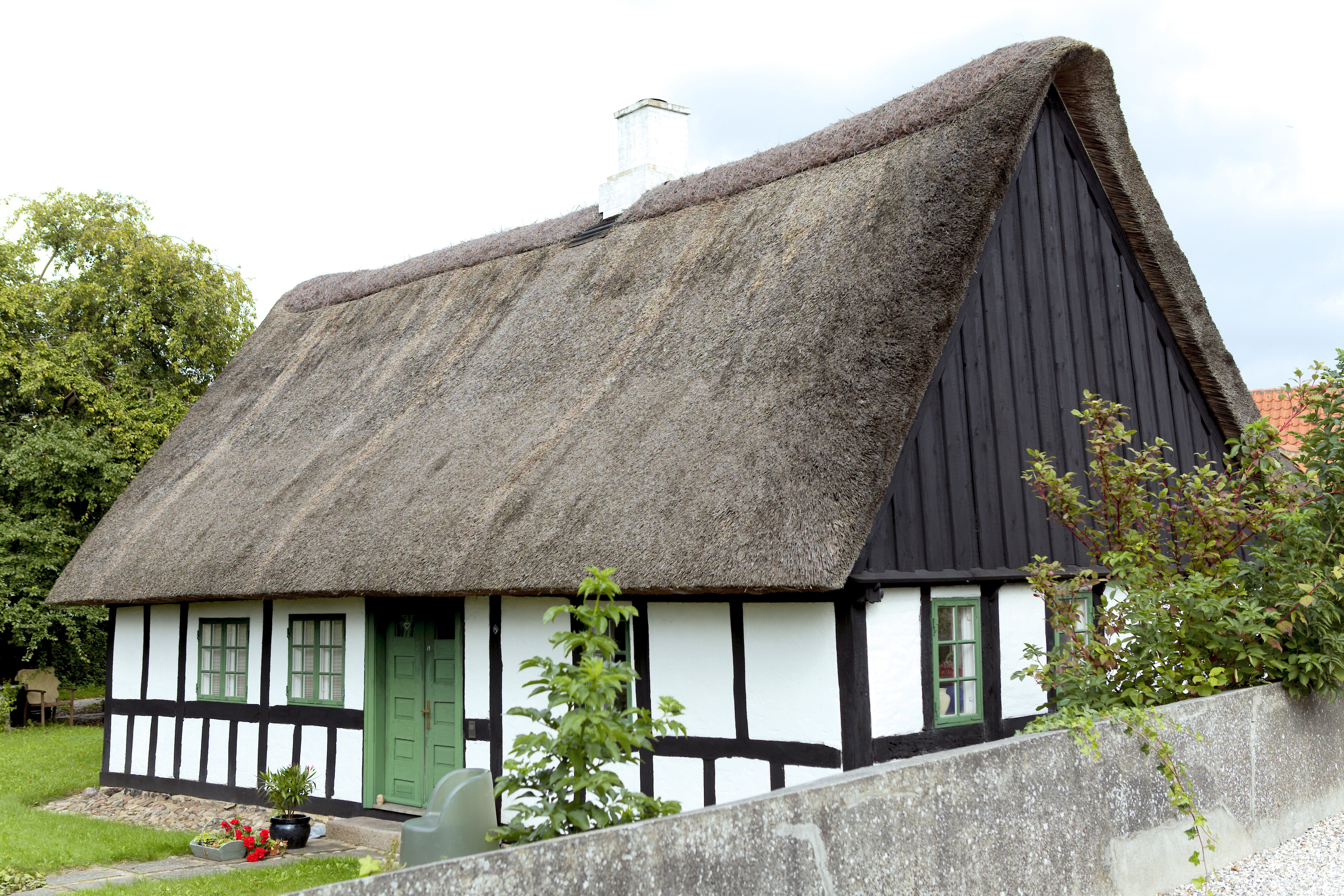
- Interactive map of the Thorald's House area

General information
- Location: Aarhus, Denmark
- Completed: c. 1750

Technical details
- Floor count: 1

Thorald's House (Danish:Thoralds Hus) is a house and a listed building in Aarhus, Denmark. The house was built in approximately 1750 and was listed on the Danish registry of protected buildings and places by the Danish Heritage Agency on 21 March 2012. The house is situated in the Tilst suburb 8 km west of the city center, adjacent to the Tilst Church.

== History ==
The house was built some time in the mid-1700s as a smallholding under Lyngbygård. The house had a piece of land by Geding Lake attached during the land redistribution of the late 18th century land reforms. The house is described in an 1834 copyhold document as 9 joists long with a threshing floor and a flail in the 3 northernmost joists, stable in the two southernmost and home in the middle. The census of 1840 counted 9 residents in the 62 m2 residential area. During this time the building was likely expanded 1 meter in width to the east and was possibly made a freehold. The status is not known for certain but in 1860 Peter Jensen is counted as "house father" in the census while he was counted as copyholder as in 1840.

In 1870 another census Niels Rasmussen is named farm manager but in 1880 he is listed as "day laborer in agriculture" and in 1890 simply workman. At some point during the late 1800s the barn to the north was demolished and the stable to the south was made a part of the residential unit. Between 1918 and 1953 the house was occupied by Thorald Nielsen from who the house gets its name.

In 1980 Tilst parish council bought the house in order to eventually expand the Tilst Church cemetery. Later there were plans to remodel it as a home for the gravedigger but the council thought the price would be too high and instead applied to demolish the building. The building had been noted as architecturally interesting and worthy of preservation on several occasions but the Aarhus Municipality city council nonetheless granted permission. The parish in the end did not have the funds to remove the building and as a result of widespread protests it was instead given to the "Tilst-Kasted-Geding Local History Organisation" in 1998 which established a foundation to renovate and preserve the building which was initiated in the 2000s and completed in 2010. On 21 March 2012 the building was listed and today it is used as a private residence.

== Architecture ==
The basis for the listing was that the house is a rare example of the typical and formerly ubiquitous smallholder farms of the 1600s–1800s. The visual relationship to Tilst Kirke and the unchanged appearance of the building was also considered important. The house is a half-timbered wattle and daub structure. It is whitewashed with visible black tarred wooden beams, a thatched roof with pointed wooden gables and one brick chimney.

== See also ==
- Listed buildings in Aarhus Municipality
