= Langkær Gymnasium & HF =

Langkaer Gymnasium: STX, HF & IB World School
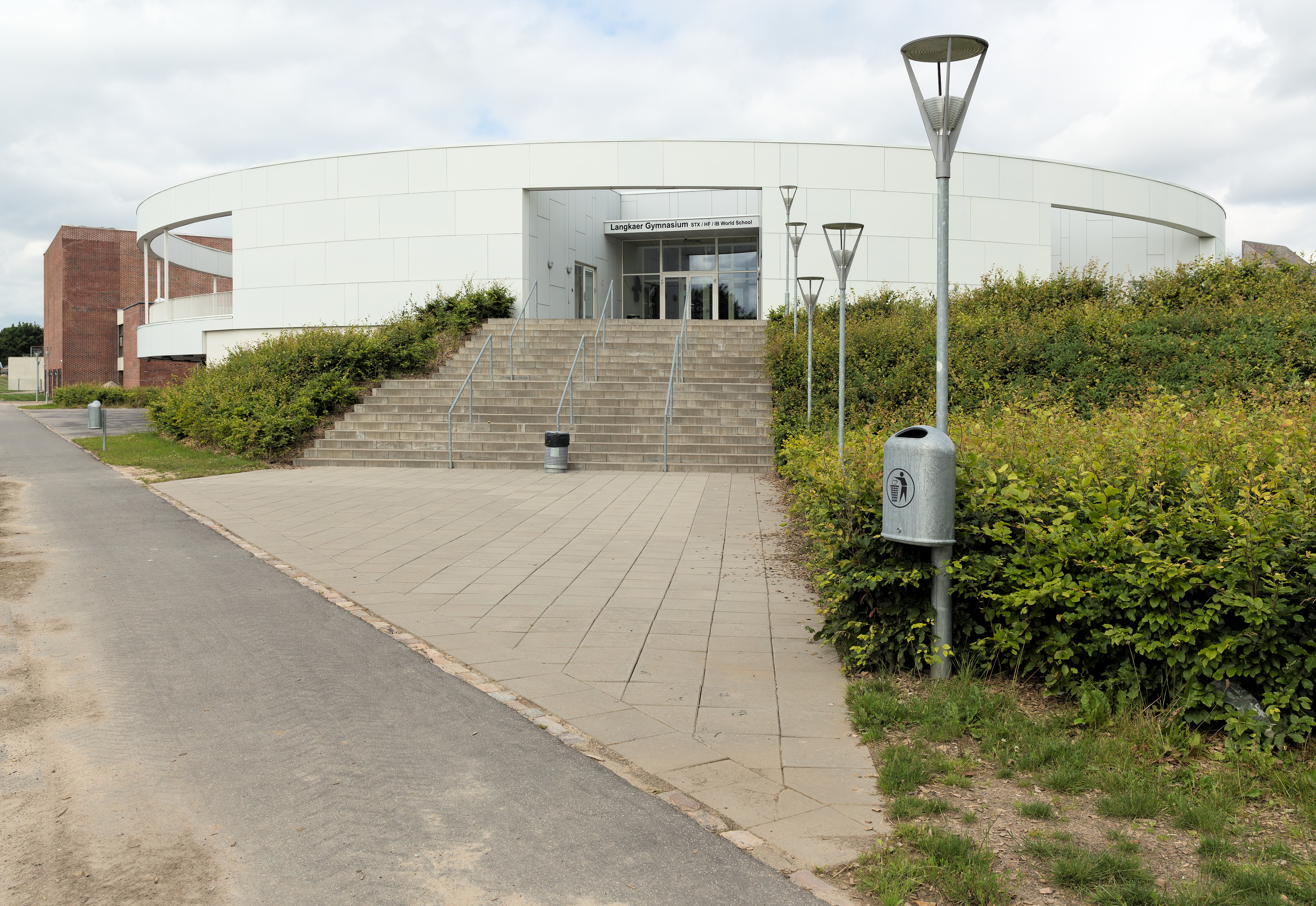
- Rear entrance

Location
- Kileparken 25; Aarhus 8381; Denmark; 56°18′59″N 10°11′24″E

Information
- Type: Gymnasium
- Established: 1975; 51 years ago
- Closed: 2018; 8 years ago
- Principal: Yago Bundgaard (2015-2018)
- Staff: 16 (2015)
- Faculty: 90 (2015)
- Enrollment: 850 (2015)
- Language: Danish, English
- Website: http://langkaer.dk/

Langkaer Gymnasium - STX, HF & IB World School (formerly Langkær Gymnasium) was a secondary school and gymnasium in Tilst, Denmark. The school opened in 1975 and effectively closed in 2018 when it merged with Aarhus Tech.

In 2014, the school had over 900 students enrolled, primarily between the ages of 15 and 19. The student body consisted of 30 classes divided between three years, with 10 new classes beginning each year. This made it the largest school of its type in Aarhus. At the time of its closure, Langkaer Gymnasium offered a 3 year matriculation examination (STX) program within four main branches: natural sciences, political sciences, linguistics and music. The school's 2 year Higher Preparatory Examination (HF) program was offered from 1975-1978 and again from 1989 onwards. Beginning in 2011, the school also offered a 2-year International Baccalaureate Diploma Programme.

Langkaer Gymnasium was a financially independent educational institution under the Danish state. It taught many students from the western area of Aarhus in addition to those from neighboring towns such as Galten, Hammel, Sabro and Mundelstrup. Compared to other gymnasiums in the greater Aarhus area with very limited diversity, Langkaer Gymnasium's student body, particularly after 2010, consisted of an increasing percentage of students from minority backgrounds. Controversial policies which divided students by their ethnic background gained significant national and international media attention in 2016. This controversy caused a rapid decline in student enrolment which eventually led to the school's closure.

== History ==
The formal decision to build Langkaer Gymnasium was made on the 3rd of April, 1973 and construction work commenced in August 1974. The site in Kileparken was previously part of the Tåstumgård farm, which had been bought by Aarhus County in the late 1960s. Initially, there were visions of a school that could integrate academic and vocational educational programmes, but the collaborative work between the Danish Ministry of Education and Aarhus County ended when ministerial proposals for an integrated approach to youth education were shelved in 1977. From its opening in 1975, Langkaer Gymnasium instead became involved in a number of different pedagogical projects and the new school was quickly recognised as an institution that embraced the sometimes experimental development of teaching practices.

Langkaer Gymnasium changed the Danish 'æ' in its name to the anglicised 'ae' upon becoming an IB school. Langkaer Gymnasium had been chosen to house the IB Diploma Programme in Aarhus after both Langkaer Gymnasium and the more centrally located (and much older) Aarhus Katedralskole had competed to become the city's first IB school. The school's IB programme was officially inaugurated by Mary, Crown Princess of Denmark in September 2011. In the space of a few years, and with an influx of international teachers working in tandem with their Danish colleagues, the school established itself as one of the most successful IB schools in Denmark. IB graduates from Langkaer Gymnasium achieved high diploma scores, some received places at prestigious international universities and, despite the school facing a number of wider challenges from 2015 onwards, the number of IB students at the school continued to grow. A developing IB student body enabled Langkaer to offer a wider range of IB subjects; among the new IB subjects introduced were Environmental Systems and Societies, Global Politics and Music. IB students from Langkaer were regular participants in Model United Nations (MUN) conferences at Birkerød Gymnasium. An increasing interest in MUN led students from Langkaer at first to found their own, smaller MUN conferences and then to collaborate with students from Ikast-Brande Gymnasium to hold successful MUN conferences with over 100 delegates.

=== Controversy ===
As the demographics of the school's students changed more rapidly after 2010, the school faced a number of challenges that tested its identity. A number of former and current students from the school travelled to Syria to fight for ISIS, with police stating that individuals with connections to the Grimhøj Mosque (Danish: Grimhøjmoskeen) had been a catalyst for the group. In 2020, the late Victor Kjærulff, a former teacher and student counsellor at Langkaer Gymnasium, reflected upon some of the difficulties that he had encountered as a teacher at a school where an increasing number of students had non-western backgrounds. The school worked with the police, religious leaders, local schools and other organisations to counter radicalisation and to provide insight into democratic processes. One example of this was the visit of the American ambassador to Denmark, Rufus Gifford, who took part in a workshop on democratic participation and civic responsibility in 2015. Another example was the school banning group prayer sessions in an attempt to stop social control and maintain its integrity as a secular school.

The relative lack of minority students at other high schools in the area was a significant 'push' factor and Langkær's reputation and diversity was in itself a 'pull' factor for applicants of non-Danish backgrounds. However, in 2016, Langkaer Gymnasium was the focus of significant national and international media attention after it became public knowledge that the school had allocated students into classes based on whether they had a Danish background. The school's then principal, Yago Bundgaard, and the chairman of Langkaer's active student council, Jens Philip Yazdani, both described the move as the 'least worst' option open to the school at the time as the school sought to maintain its Danish identity, while still offering an inclusive environment to students of other backgrounds. After the controversy, the number of new students who chose the school's STX programme decreased dramatically. Jazdani and Bundgaard would later clash on matters such as the students' right to pray in groups as Langkaer Gymnasium sought to solve a unique set of challenges relating to integration.

=== Dissolution ===
Langkaer's financial footing had previously been sound, but faced increasing problems as a result of dwindling student numbers coupled with government funding cuts. Unbeknownst to the school's staff, Yago Bundgaard made contact to other educational institutions in the local area and agreed in principle to a merger with Aarhus Tech. Bundgaard was of the opinion that a merger was the only means of securing the school's long-term survival and thus being able to offer high school programmes in the western half of Aarhus. Aarhus Tech's leadership called the merger a "good match". Yago Bundgaard, who would become a director in the new organisation, would later admit that Langkaer Gymnasium would be 'swallowed up' by the merger. Nevertheless, the merger was in due course ratified by the school's board of governors. Despite increased spending on marketing, including advertisements on buses in Aarhus, the decreasing student numbers and ensuing staff redundancies that had marked the final years of Langkaer Gymnasium continued under the school's new leadership. There were 10 full-time redundancies in the 'youth' division of Aarhus Tech immediately after the merger, the majority of which were teachers from Langkaer Gymnasium. Further redundancies would follow. Within two years of the merger, all of Langkaer's management staff, except the former vice principal, Marie Kongskov, had left the school. In the same period, all of Langkaer's technical and administrative staff were made redundant, had left or were relocated, canteen management was centralised and the school's administrative and communications systems had been replaced. These fundamental changes to its governance, leadership, staff, and organisational structure were followed by Aarhus Tech's confirmation that a closure of its STX, Hf, Pre-IB and IB programmes in Tilst was imminent.

On October 15, 2018, then Minister for Education, Merete Riisager, had made the announcement that Langkaer Gymnasium had formally merged with Aarhus Tech. As a result, the school's name changed to AARHUS GYMNASIUM, Tilst (capitals intended). The ramifications of the merger were controversial, not least the introduction of STX classes to a location in the heart of Aarhus, at Dollerupvej. Prior to 2016, high schools in Aarhus had coexisted in a friendly manner, meeting regularly to share pedagogical and leadership practices and there were 'gentleman' agreements with regards to marketing etc. This contrasted the situation in other larger Danish towns and cities, where schools had taken increasingly aggressive approaches to ensure that students chose them. However, government funding cuts coincided with the increasing problems relating to the distribution of students with non-Danish cultural backgrounds in the Aarhus area. As such, applicants had become an increasingly important commodity, with falling numbers resulting in staff redundancies, but Langkaer's issues showed that vastly altered student demographics could quickly lead to a decrease in the size of future cohorts. As an indication of a previously unseen willingness to pursue aggressive tactics among Danish educational institutions, five high schools in Aarhus, led by Marselisborg Gymnasium, actively investigated the possibility of a hostile takeover of Langkaer Gymnasium in August 2018.

== Academics ==
Langkaer was the scene of many cultural activities from student-produced musicals, concerts and art exhibitions to a feminist study group.

Students from Langkaer regularly received high placings in the nationwide Georg Mohr competition in mathematics. The school often featured among the best Danish schools with regards to its ability to improve the grades of students compared to expectations based upon socio-economic predictors. Teachers from the school published textbooks that won awards and were well-received by fellow educators. Reading counsellors travelled to other schools to share insights into how to support students with learning challenges, such as reading and writing problems for students with non-academic, non-Danish or mixed cultural backgrounds. Langkaer Gymnasium's identity was often defined in relation to 'Langkærånden' (the Langkaer spirit). This diffuse term was used to describe the ambition of the school's staff to overcome adversity and help students and staff to grow by standing together as a collective. The cumulative effect of Langkaer Gymnasium's approach could be seen in the results of its graduates, many of whom emphasised the ability of the school's staff to help them develop and improve.

Langkaer Gymnasium played a prominent role within the sphere of high school internationalisation in Denmark and it had partner schools in places such as Belgrade, Nanjing, Ramallah, Singapore and Murcia. It was a founding member of the Globale Gymnasier association in Denmark and teachers participated in numerous Comenius, Erasmus and eTwinning projects.

== Facilities ==
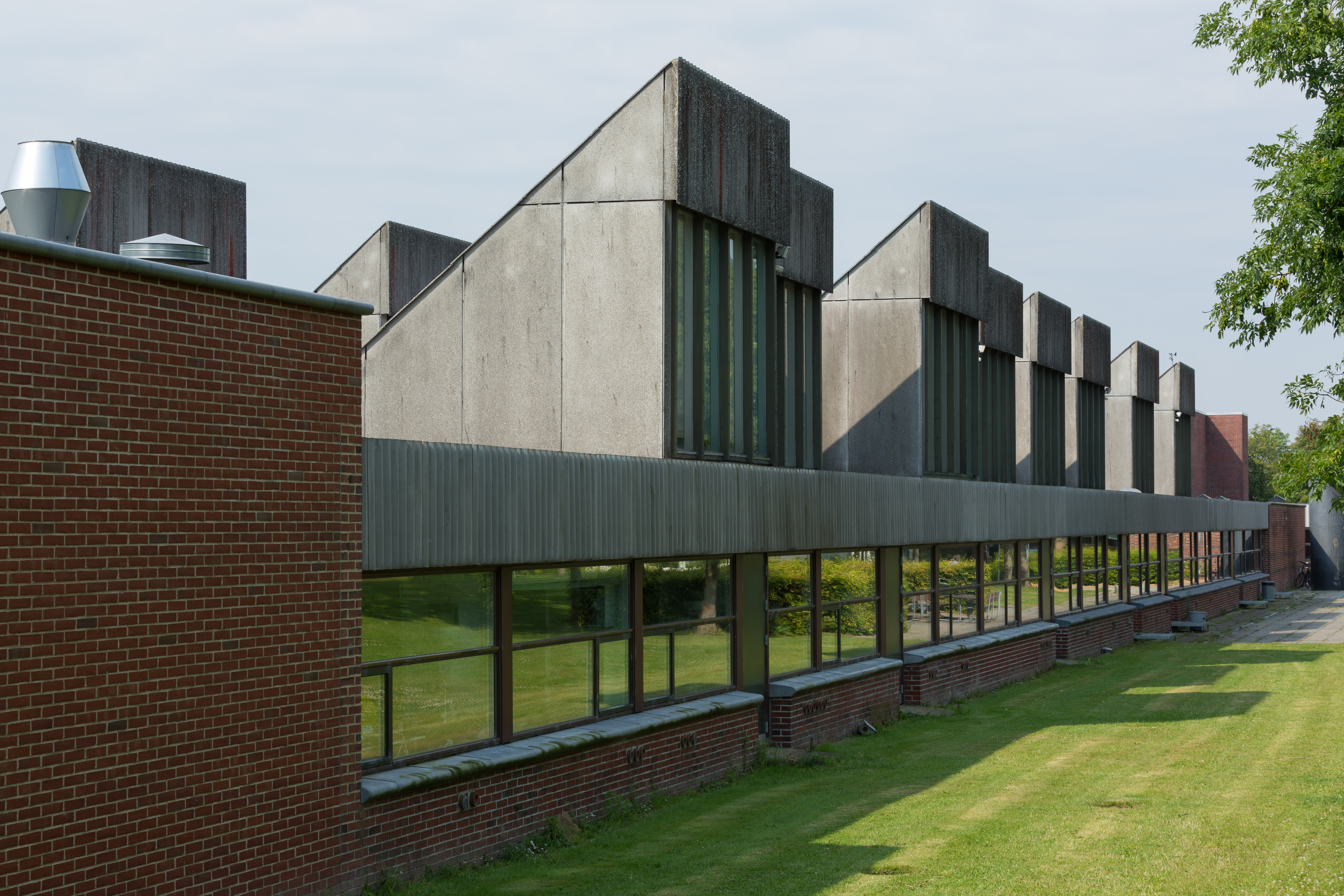
Northern side of Langkaer Gymnasium

The school opened in 1975. Its facilities were designed by Friis & Moltke Architects. A new section of the school was completed in 2011–12.

Langkaer Gymnasium housed several works of art, including an imposing sculptural work at the entrance to the school, called 'Angels and Ghosts' by Erik A. Frandsen. Frandsen's work was affectionately known as 'grillstarteren' (English: the chimney starter) by staff.

The school's location adjacent to the Danish Football Association's Jutland headquarters meant that there was access to excellent sporting facilities and the school's main hall and other buildings often housed activities for local groups and associations.

== Notable students ==
- Allan Sørensen, Weekendavisen journalist
- Jens Philip Yazdani
- Karin Dahl Hansen, journalist and editor, Kristeligt Dagblad
- Mikkel Andersson, journalist
- Morten Breum, DJ and producer
- Nagin Ravand, footballer, coach and leader of initiatives for girls in Aarhus
- Rabih Azad-Ahmed, politician
- Søren Sko, musician

== See also ==
- Tilst
- Aarhus Tech
- Education in Aarhus
