= Lyngbygård =

Coordinates: 56.16959°N 10.02827°E

Lyngby Estate
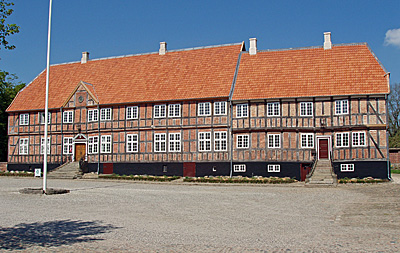
- Main façade of Lyngbygård
- Interactive map of the Lyngby Estate area

General information
- Architectural style: Half-timbered
- Location: Aarhus, Denmark
- Completed: 1756

Technical details
- Floor count: 2

Website
- Lyngbygaard

Lyngbygård (lit. 'Lyngby Manor') is a manor house and a listed building in Aarhus Municipality, Denmark. The estate is 225 hectares of land situated by Lyngbygård River, 4 km. west of Tilst in Aarhus. The manor building was listed by the Danish Heritage Agency on 9 July 1918.

The estate is today family owned and much of the surrounding land has been turned into golf courses under Lyngbygaard Golf. The park is open to the public according to an agreement with the owner and Aarhus Municipality.

== History ==
The area is known from the 14th century when the lands is thought to have belonged to the nunnery Ring by Skanderborg Lake. After the Reformation in 1536 the lands were confiscated by the crown, like all other church owned property. In 1579 the lands were taken over by the noble woman Anne Skram and a number of small farms on them were merged to form Lyng-bygård (Lit. Ling-townfarm). The following year Anne Skram married Christian Munk and it is believed they were the ones to build the original farm buildings in 1596. The buildings no longer exist, but traces can be found in the form of an arched basement under the western section of the current main building.

Over the following century until 1686 ownership of the estate changed a number of times until 1686 when Johan Arentsen Althalt buys it. The estate would stay in the Althalt family until the 19th century. In 1766, Johan Arent Althalt, had the eastern part of the manor house built in 1755. In 1775 his widow had the former main building torn down and the current two-storey half-timbered structure in red brick was constructed in its place. Ownership of the estate has since changed a number of times and many additions and restorations has been made including new stables and barn. The farm has since 1945 been owned by the family which bought it in 1945. It is operated as a modern agricultural operation along with two neighbouring farms.

== Architecture ==
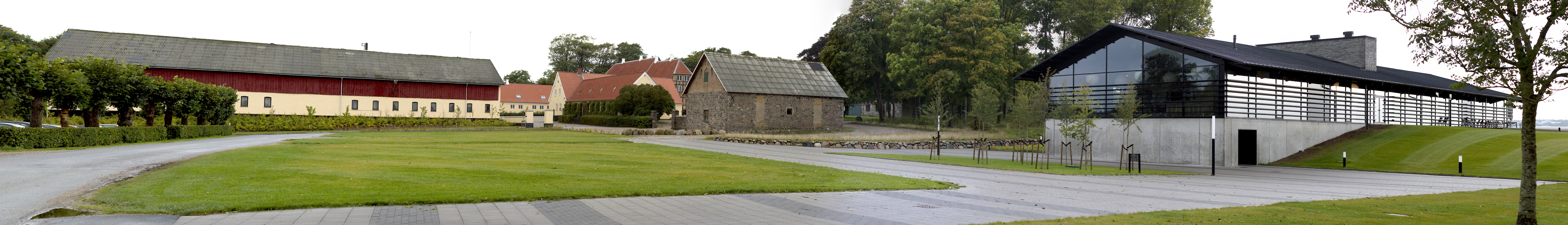
Panoramic view of the Lyngby Estate.

The west building is a well-preserved example of a large half-timbered structure divided between an east building from 1775 and a west building from 1755. The external walls are built of granite boulders and the low and wide barrel vault with groins over the windows are formed by large medieval bricks. Both buildings have wooden cornices, hip roofs, spires and ridge turrets. The east building has a front dormer over the main entrance which is decorated with an architrave. Steep steps lead to the entrance which has wooden pilasters.

The interior has much of the original furniture, wing doors, panels and stucco. Many rooms have Dutch doors, with brass mountings. There are iron stoves throughout the building including a Norwegian one with rococo decorations. The kitchen section of the manor house had a four-sided tower built in 1876. The western section of basement is arched and is the oldest remains from the original structures. In the middle of the basement sits a four-sided substructure, which carries the great brick fireplace in the hall.

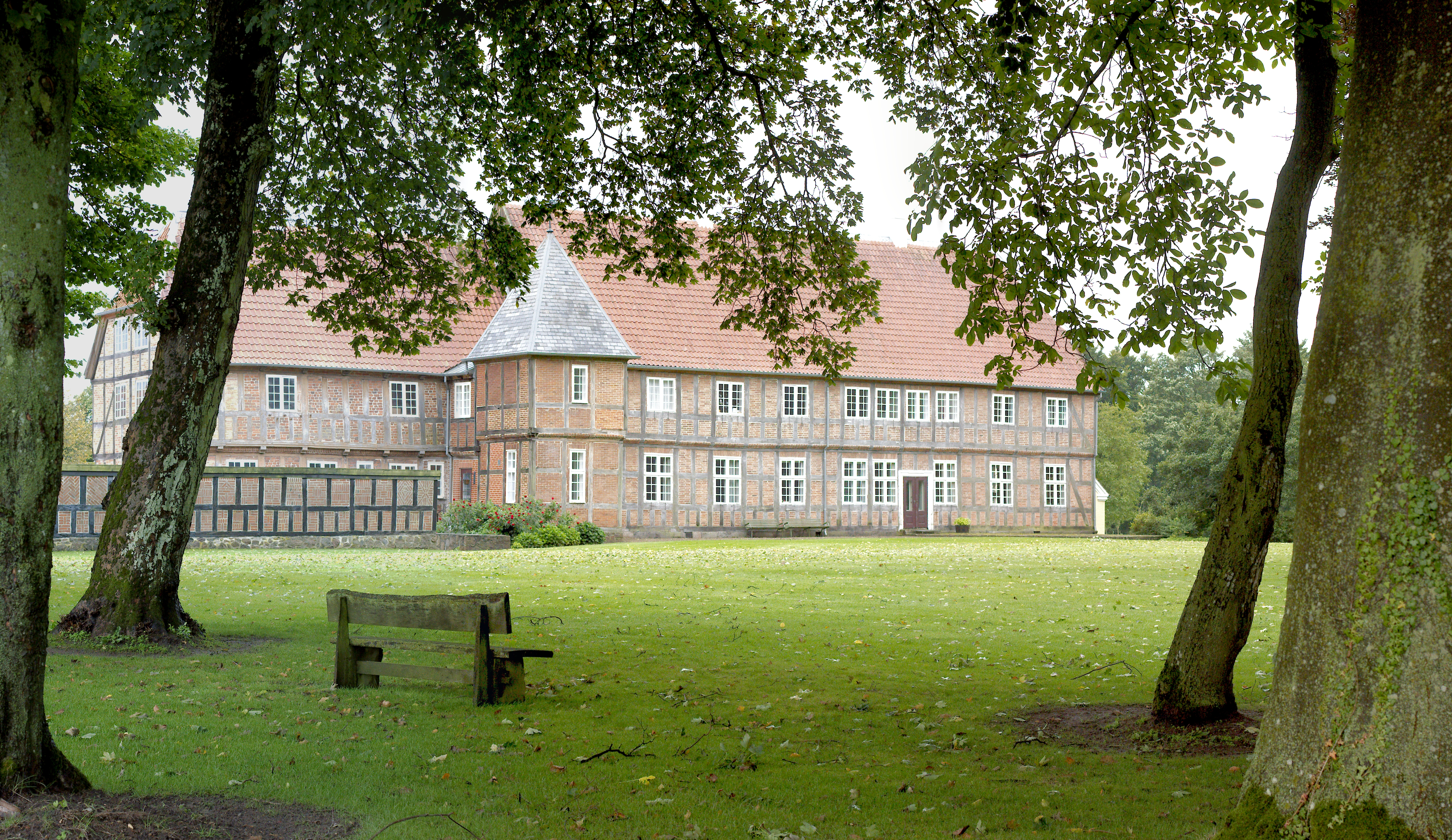
Lyngbygård set fra haven

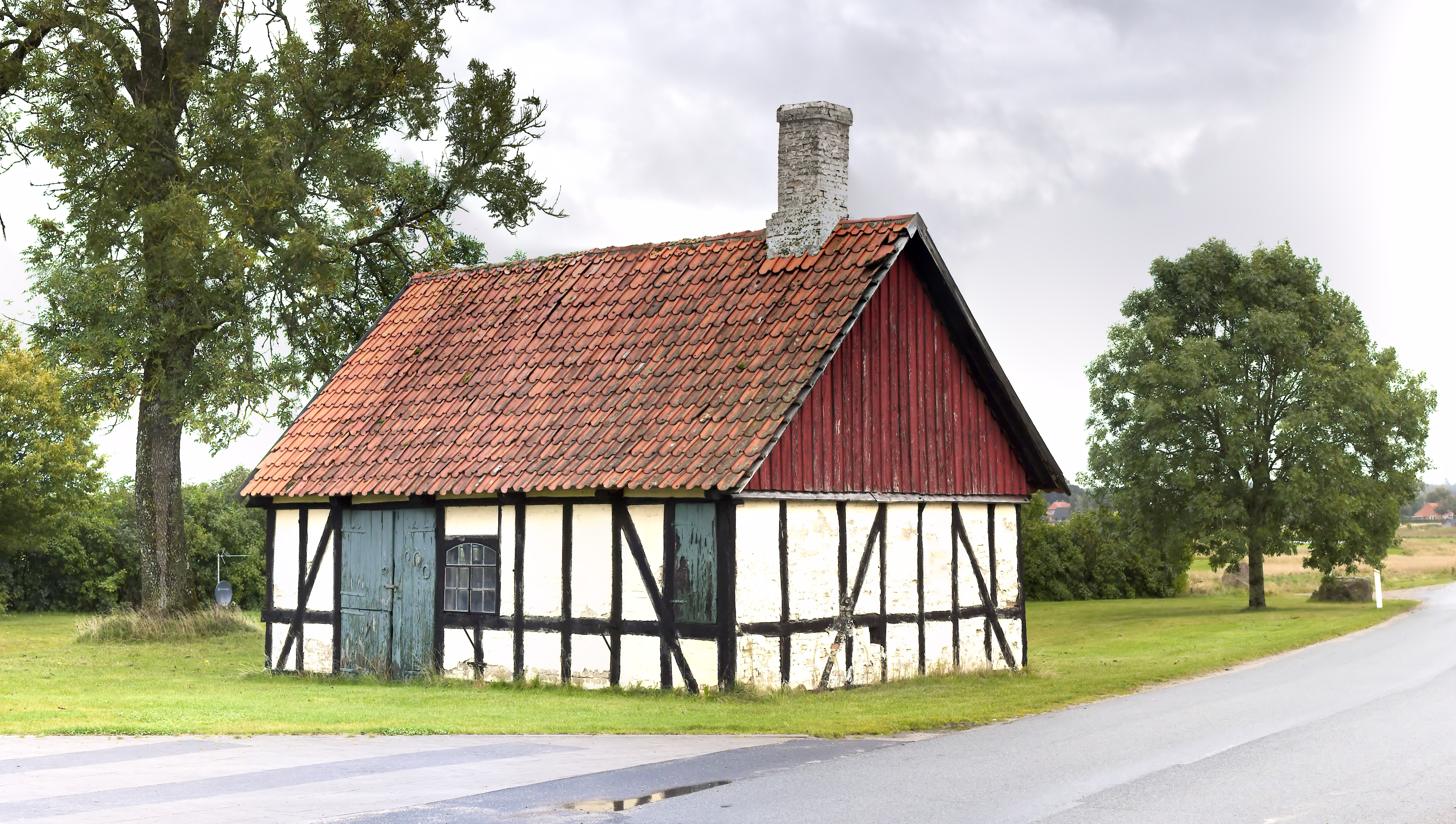
Smedjen ved Lyngbygård

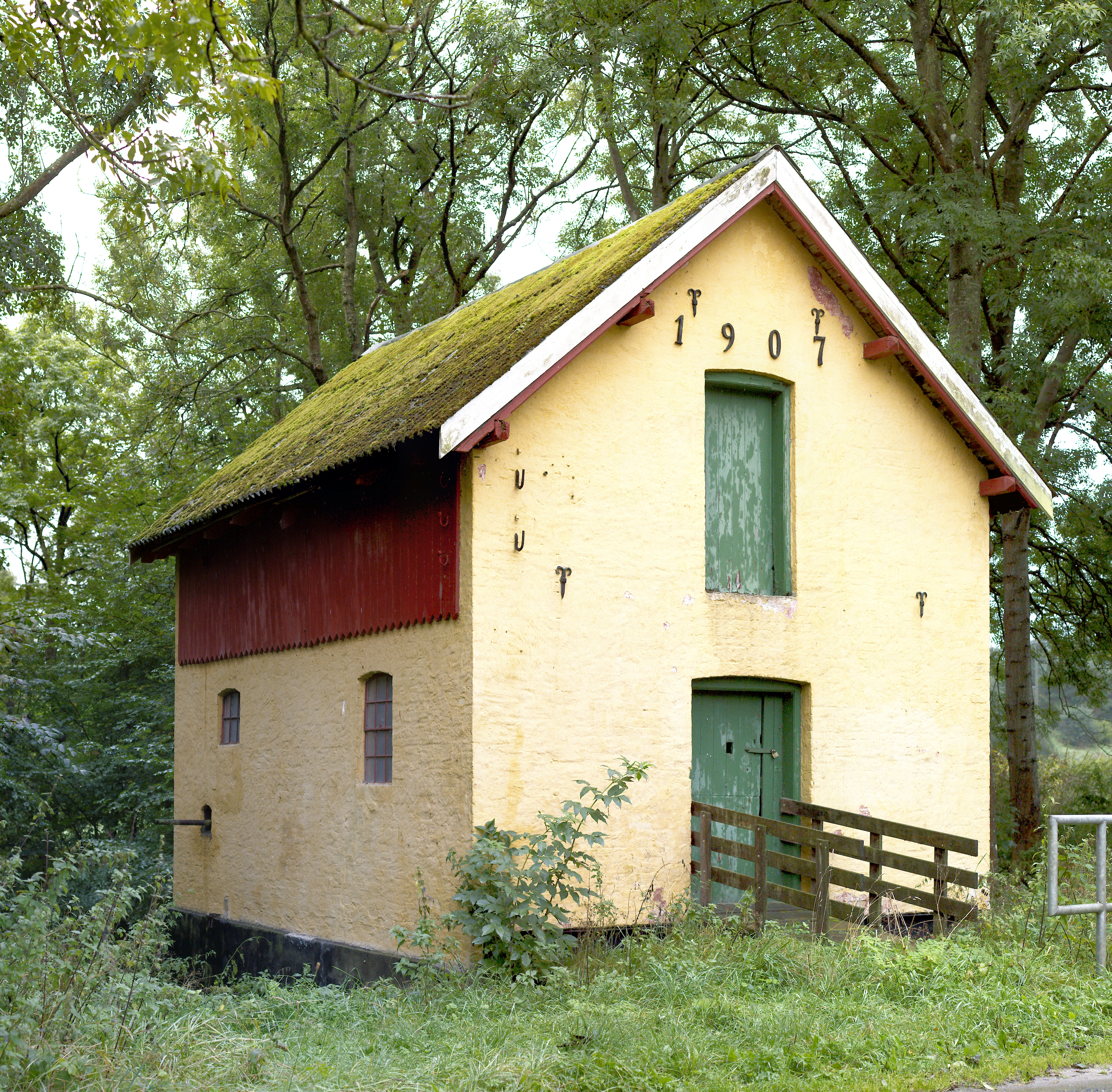
Vandmøllen

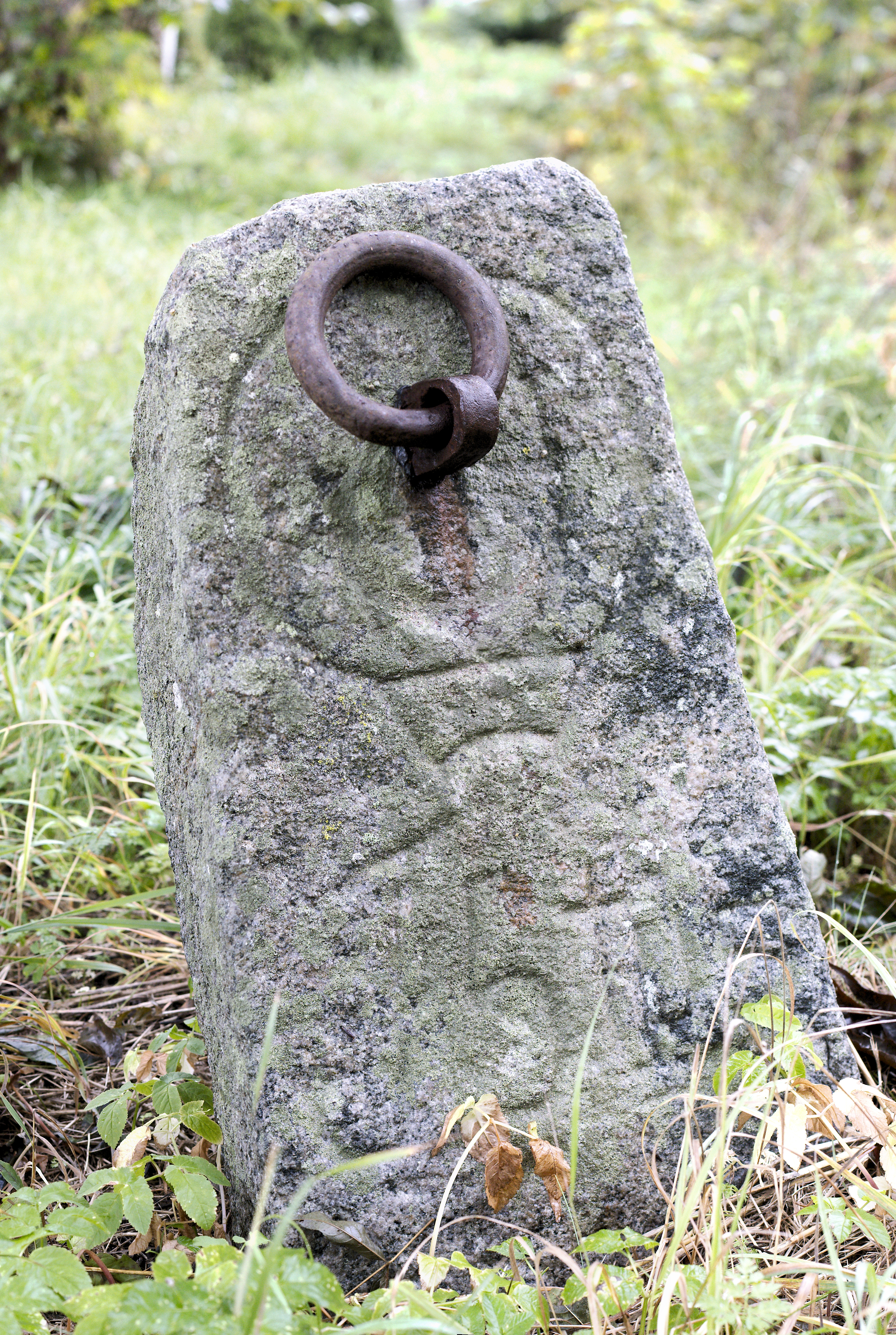
Vildtbanestenen
