= Søren Sko =

Danish singer and songwriter (born 1963)

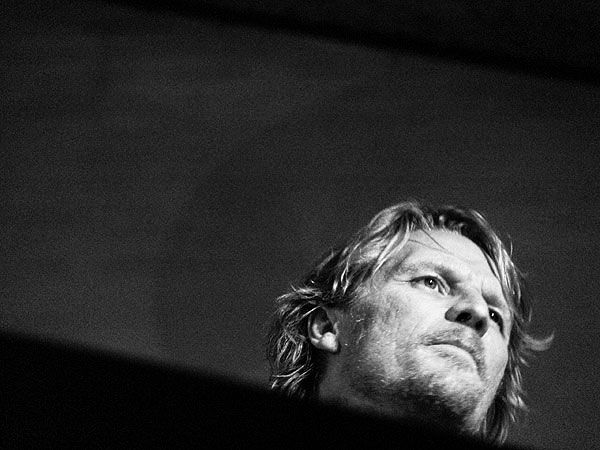
- Sko at Tversted Jazzy Days Festival

Background information
- Born: Søren Svenninggaard Sørensen; 4 June 1963 (age 62); Aalborg, Denmark
- Genres: Pop, pop rock
- Occupations: Singer, songwriter
- Years active: 1990–present

Søren Sko (born Søren Svenninggaard; 4 July 1963) is a Danish singer and songwriter, best known as a member of the duo Sko/Torp. The artist got his stage name, Sko, which means shoes in Danish, from his father who was a shoemaker in Hammel.

Sko was born in Aalborg, Denmark. At the age of 9, he and his family moved to Hammel, Denmark. He graduated from Langkær Gymnasium in 1982. After graduating he moved to Aarhus, and began singing in vocal groups for Sanne Salomonsen, among others.

== Career ==
=== Sko/Torp ===
While performing at Aarhus University, Sko met the guitarist and keyboardist Palle Torp. The two musicians formed the band Sko/Torp in 1989. The record company Sonet was reluctant to release their first album On a Long Lonely Night for fear that an English-language album would become a commercial success. Sanne Salomonsen, whose husband Mats Ronander had produced the album, persuaded the record label's manager and the album was released in 1990. On a Long Lonely Night sold more than 200,000 copies. In 1991, the duo was named the new Danish name of the year at the Danish Music Awards, and Søren Sko was named the Danish singer of the year. The duo released three more studio albums as Sko/Torp, before splitting in 1997.

Søren Sko and Palle Torp reunited as Sko/Torp in 2004. The duo began touring with their previous albums. In 2019 They released Heartland, their first album since reuniting, in collaboration with producers Nick Foss and Rune Nissen-Petersen. Their sixth album, After Hours was released in 2016.

=== Solo career ===
In September 1998, Søren Sko released his first solo album, Sko. The album sold 40,000 copies, and earned him the Danish Grammy as the Danish singer of the year. His second studio album Shine was released in March 2000. Unpolished was released in 2001, which included covers of popular songs by Eric Clapton, Neil Young, Poul Krebs, and Rick Astley, among others.

Sko's fourth album Faith Hope Love was released in October 2002. It was his first album which he had written and composed all of the songs independently. In January 2004 One for My Baby was released. The album was produced by the jazz bassist Chris Minh Doky, and featured cover versions of popular songs by Elton John, Lionel Richie, John Lennon, and Stevie Wonder. One for My Baby also contains two songs which Sko had co-written with Palle Torp. It was the first time the two had worked together since Sko/Torp split in 1997.

In 2001, Søren Sko produced EyeQ's debut album Let It Spin, which sold 150,000 copies. EyeQ won the first season of the Danish edition of Popstars on TV 2. Sko was a judge for the second season of Popstars in 2002, along with Simon Junker and choreographer Toniah Pedersen.

In 2012, Sko formed the pop-duo Shoes for Julia with Julia Fabrin Jakobsen, a former vocalist for The Fireflies. Their first single, "Cross the Line" was released that June by EMI. In October, their self-titled debut album was released.

In March 2018, Søren Sko released the album "On Cole" in collaboration with Benjamin Koppel. The album was a tribute to Nat King Cole and Søren's father.

== Discography ==
=== Sko/Torp ===
Released	Album	Record company
1990	On a Long Lonely Night	Sonet
1992	Familiar Roads	Medley
1994	Hey You!	Medley
1996	A Perfect Day	Medley
1997	Radio Song Book – De bedste fra Sko/Torp (compilation)	Medley
2007	Glorious Days – The Very Best Of (compilation)	EMI
2010	Heartland	Mermaid
2012	De første fra Sko/Torp (compilation)	EMI
2016	After Hours	Phd Music
2018	Heaven is on our side	Warner
2021	I Al Elskværdighed	Shoeshine Music

=== Søren Sko ===
Released	Album	Highest chart ranking in Denmark	Record awards
1998	Sko	7	
2000	Shine	12	
2001	Unpolished	3	Gold
2002	Faith Hope Love	—	
2004	One for My Baby	6	
2017	De Bedste (compilation)		
2018	On Cole		

=== Shoes for Julia ===
==== Albums ====
Released	Title	Highest chart ranking in Denmark
2012	Shoes for Julia	11

==== Singles ====
- "Cross the Line" (2012)
- "Bringing on the Heartache" (2012)
- "I Am the Other" (2013)
