= Tilst =

- Neighborhood
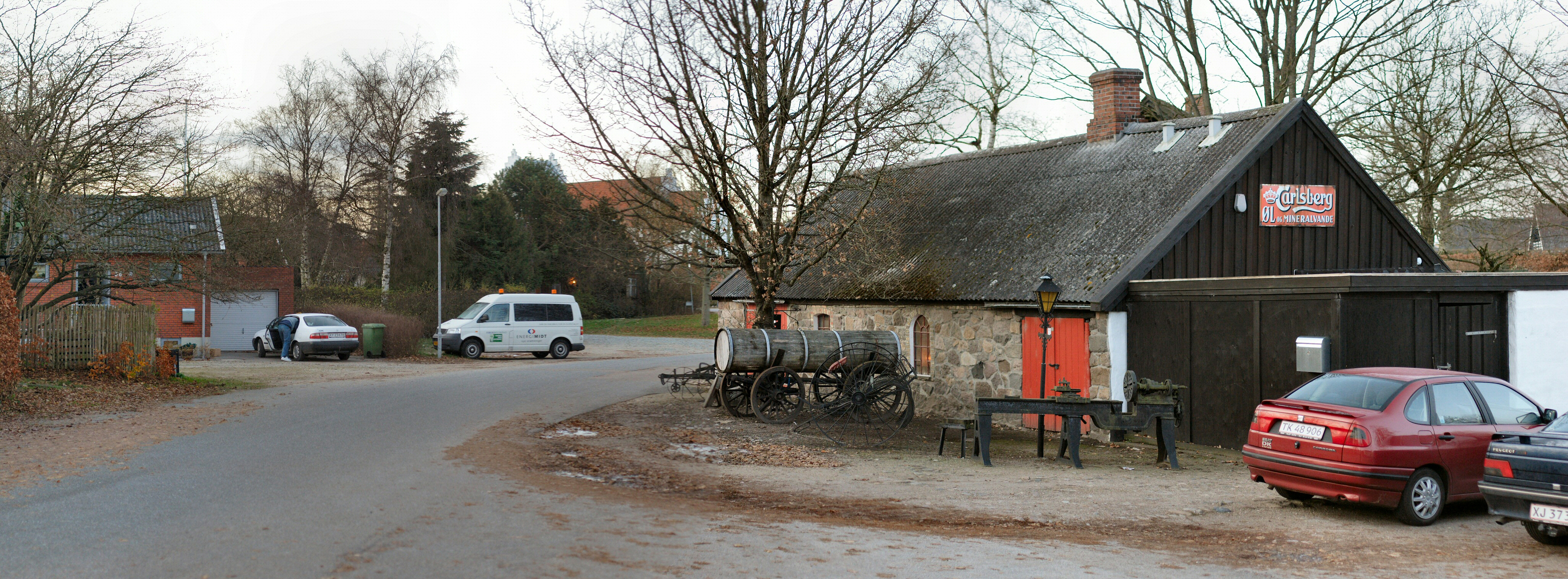
- The old village

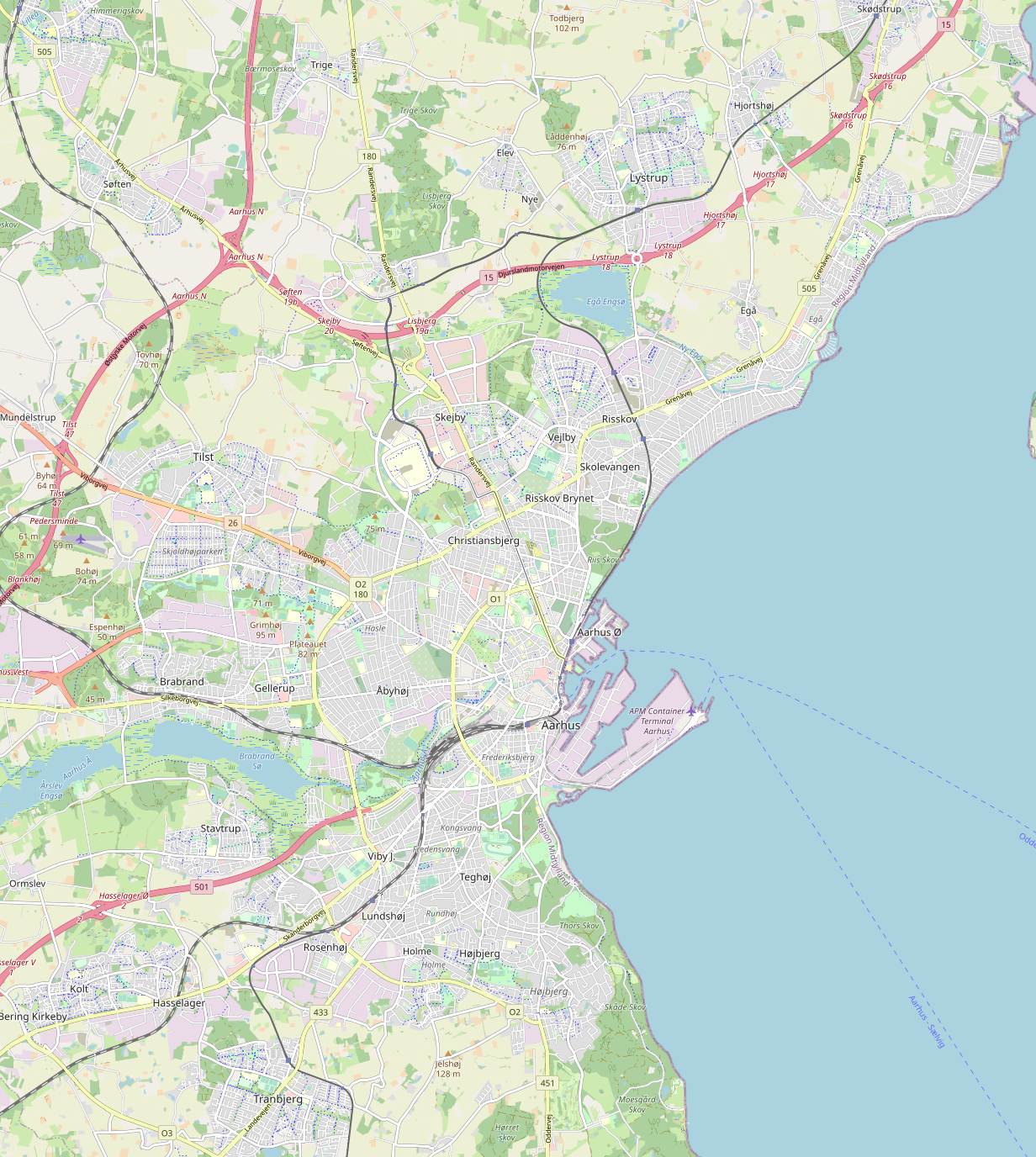
- Location within Aarhus
- Coordinates: 56.183605°N 10.112212°E
- Country: Kingdom of Denmark
- Regions of Denmark: Central Denmark Region
- Municipality: Aarhus Municipality
- District: Tilst
- Postal code: 8381

Tilst is a suburban area of Aarhus, Denmark, situated 8 km to the northwest of Aarhus.

The Tilst area is marked by big city blocks and large traditional suburban areas. In the surrounding area are several superstores, which mainly serve the inner city population of Aarhus. The area is most commonly known for the Bilka warehouse, the largest in Denmark and the only one of its kind in the Aarhus area.

The area is divided by the intercity Viborgvej road, with Tilst on the northern side, and the True and Skjoldhøj area situated to the south, bordering Brabrand and Hasle. Tilst has a relatively high density of immigrants compared to the rest of Aarhus, and the suburb is home to many ethnic groups.

Tilst is divided into several neighbourhoods, each one usually identified by its location or street names. One area for example, a residential one near the lake of Geding Sø in the western parts, is known as Blomsterkvarteret (The Flower Quarter) since all the streets are named after flowers. There is a relatively large industrial park, with mostly light industry, in the eastern outskirts of Tilst.

The local public school is Tilst Skole, and the local gymnasium is called Langkær Gymnasium og HF.

The local church, Tilst Kirke, founded in the 12th century is among the oldest churches in Scandinavia, but with several additions from the 15th century.

== Gallery ==
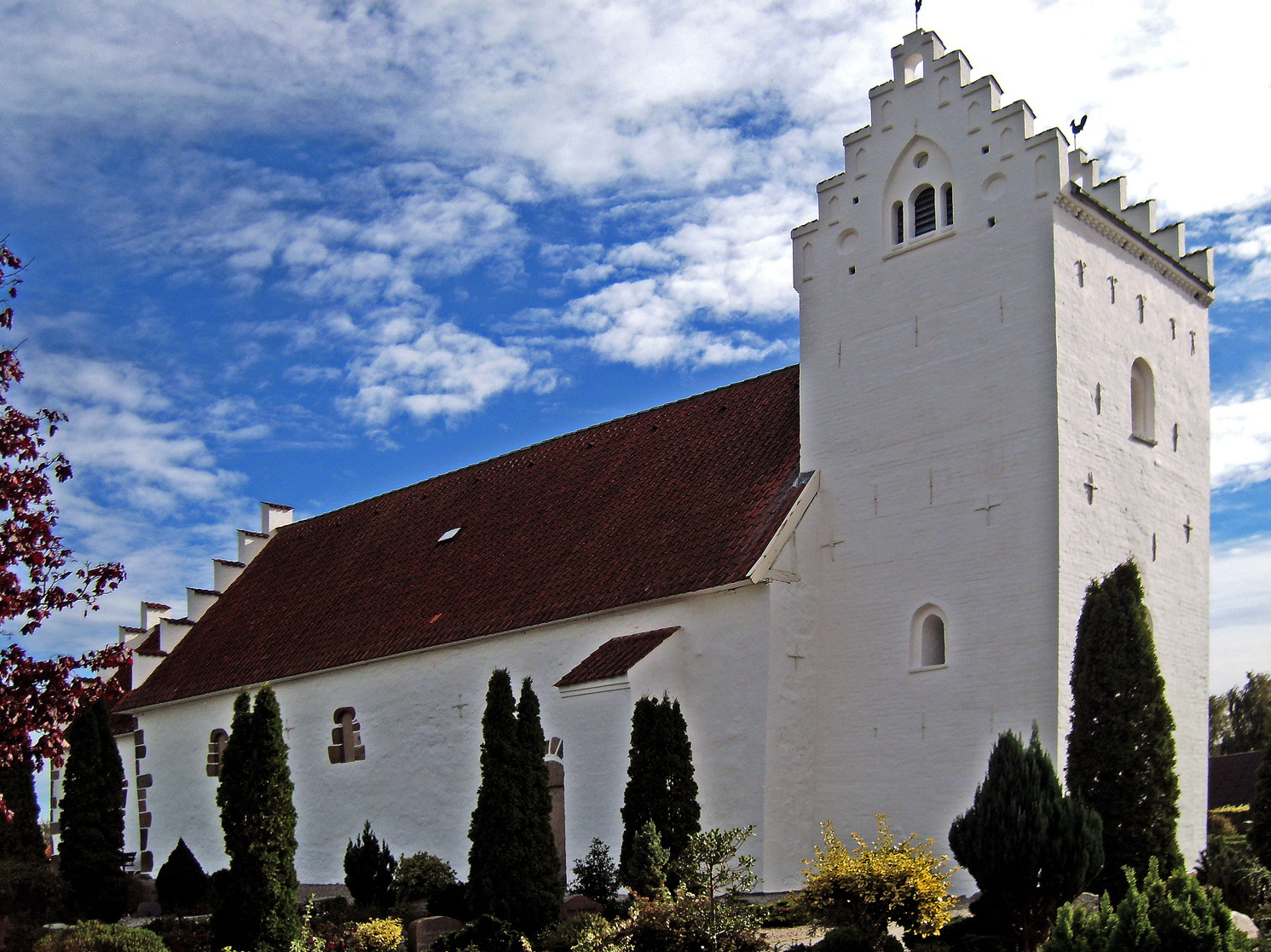
Tilst Church

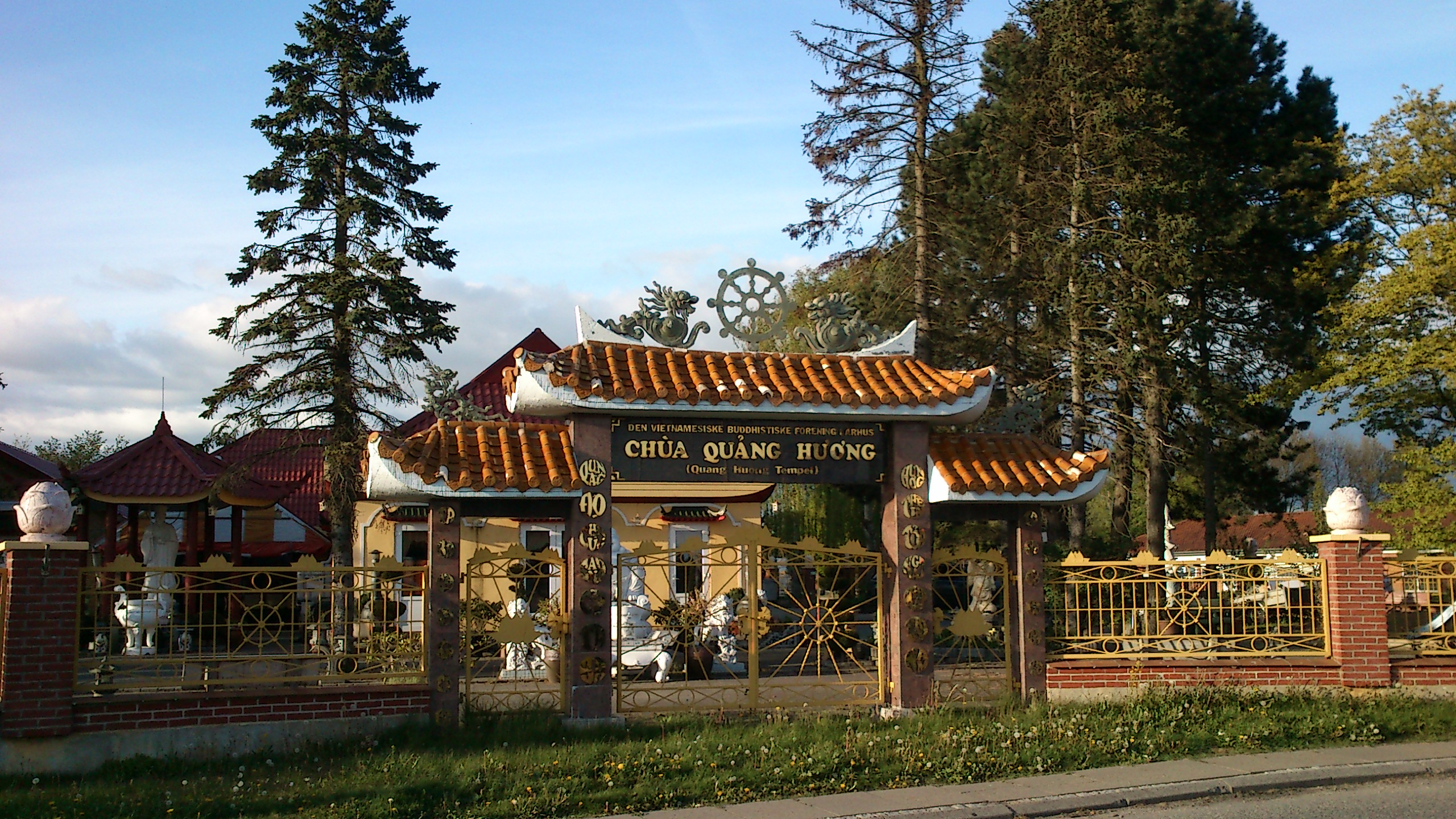
Quang Huong buddhist temple.

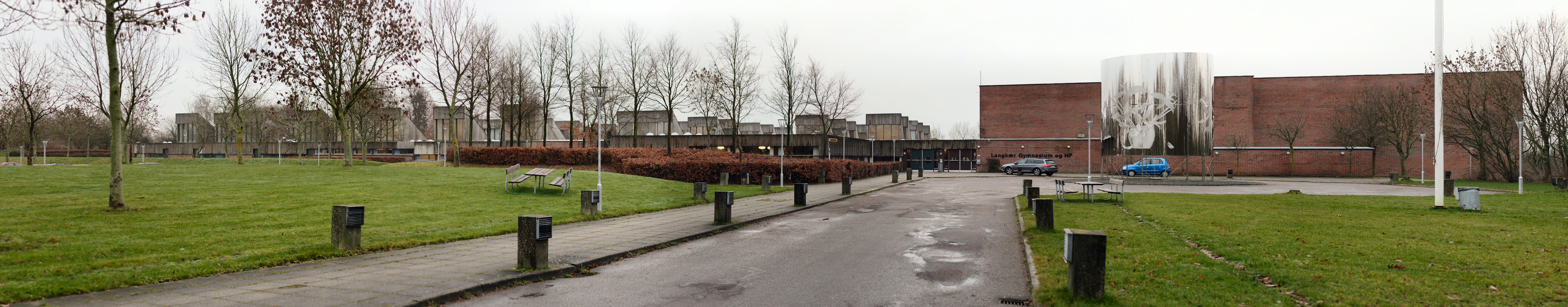
Langkær Gymnasium.

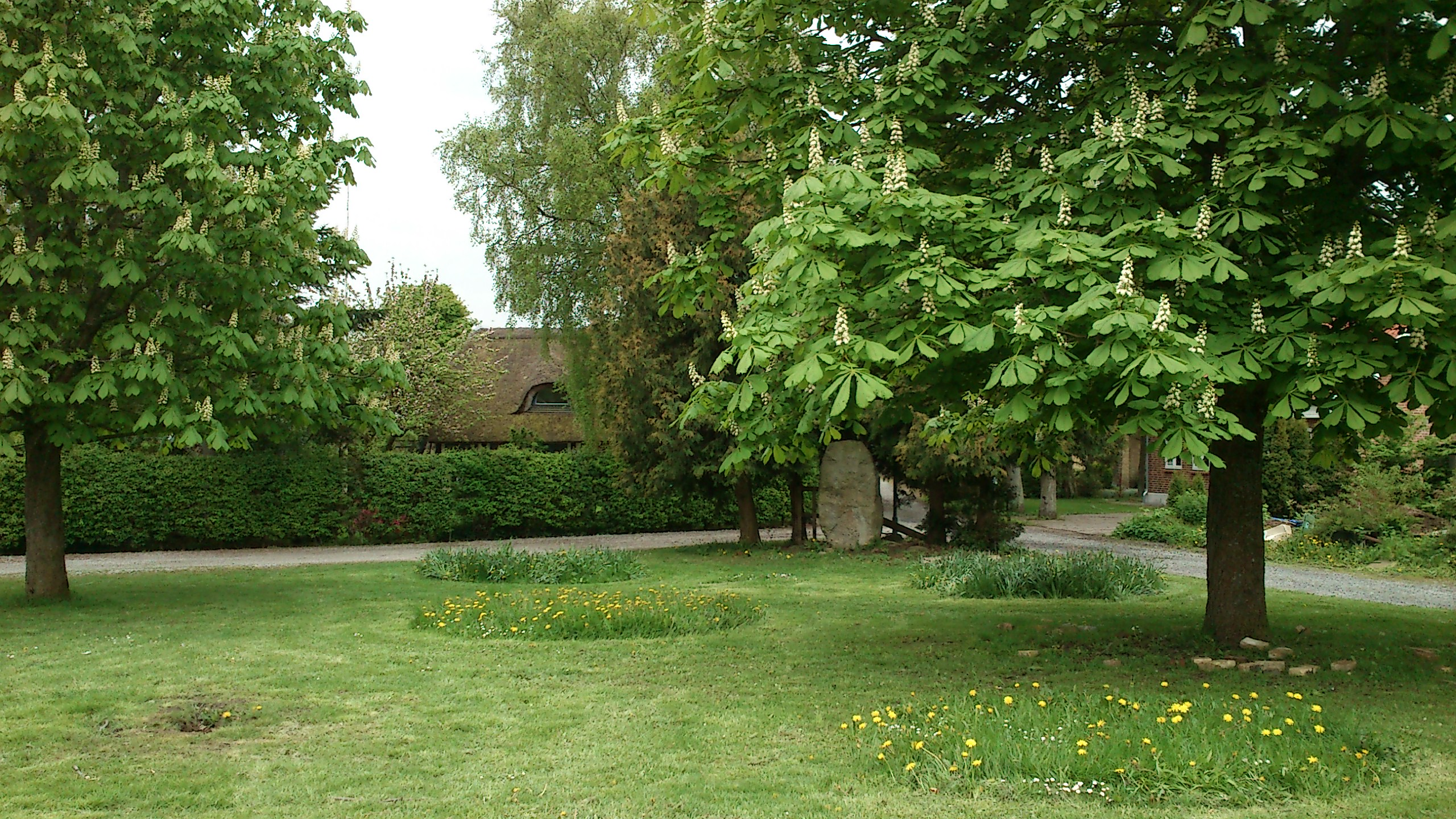
A small park area at the old village center.

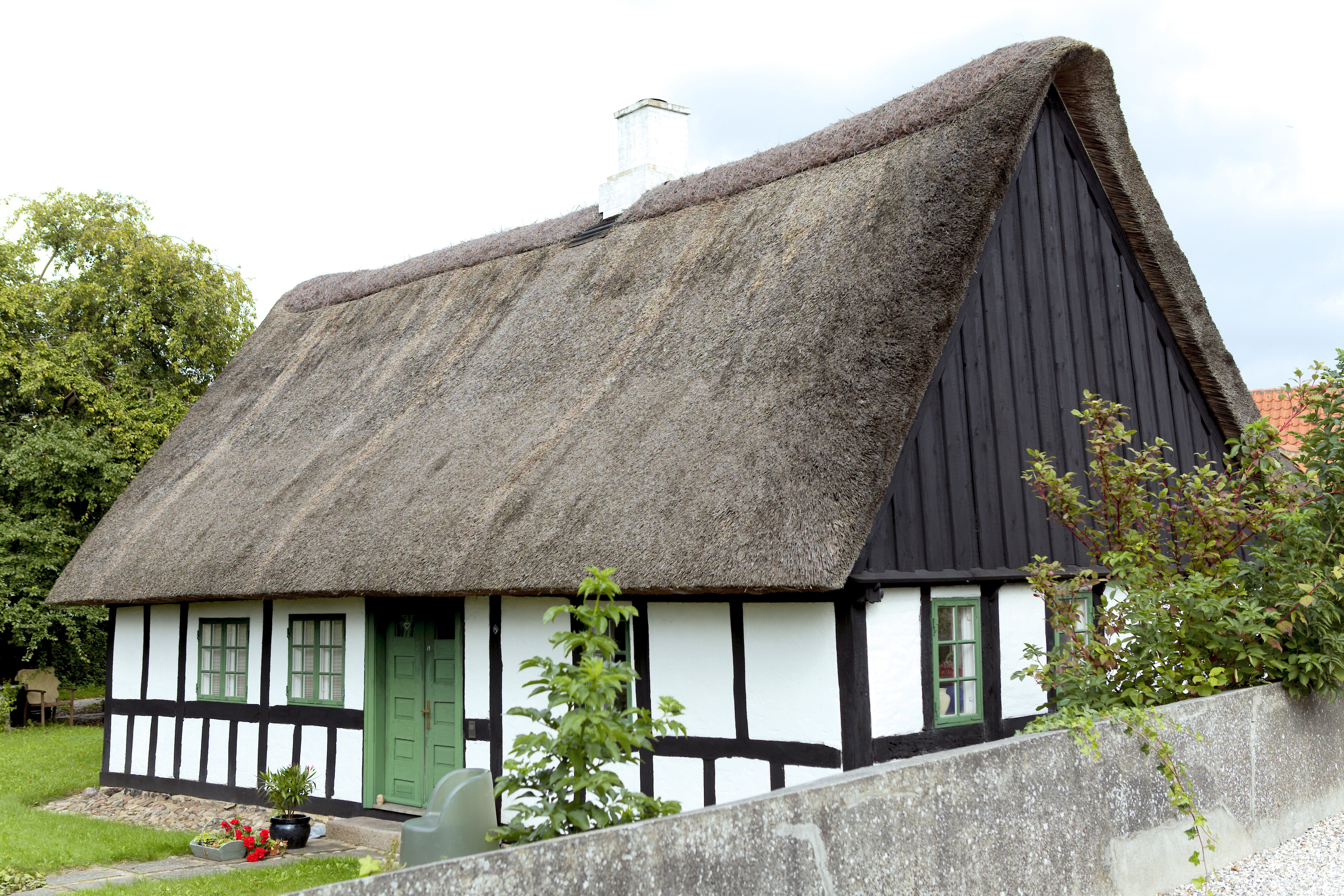
Thorald's House, a listed house in Tilst.

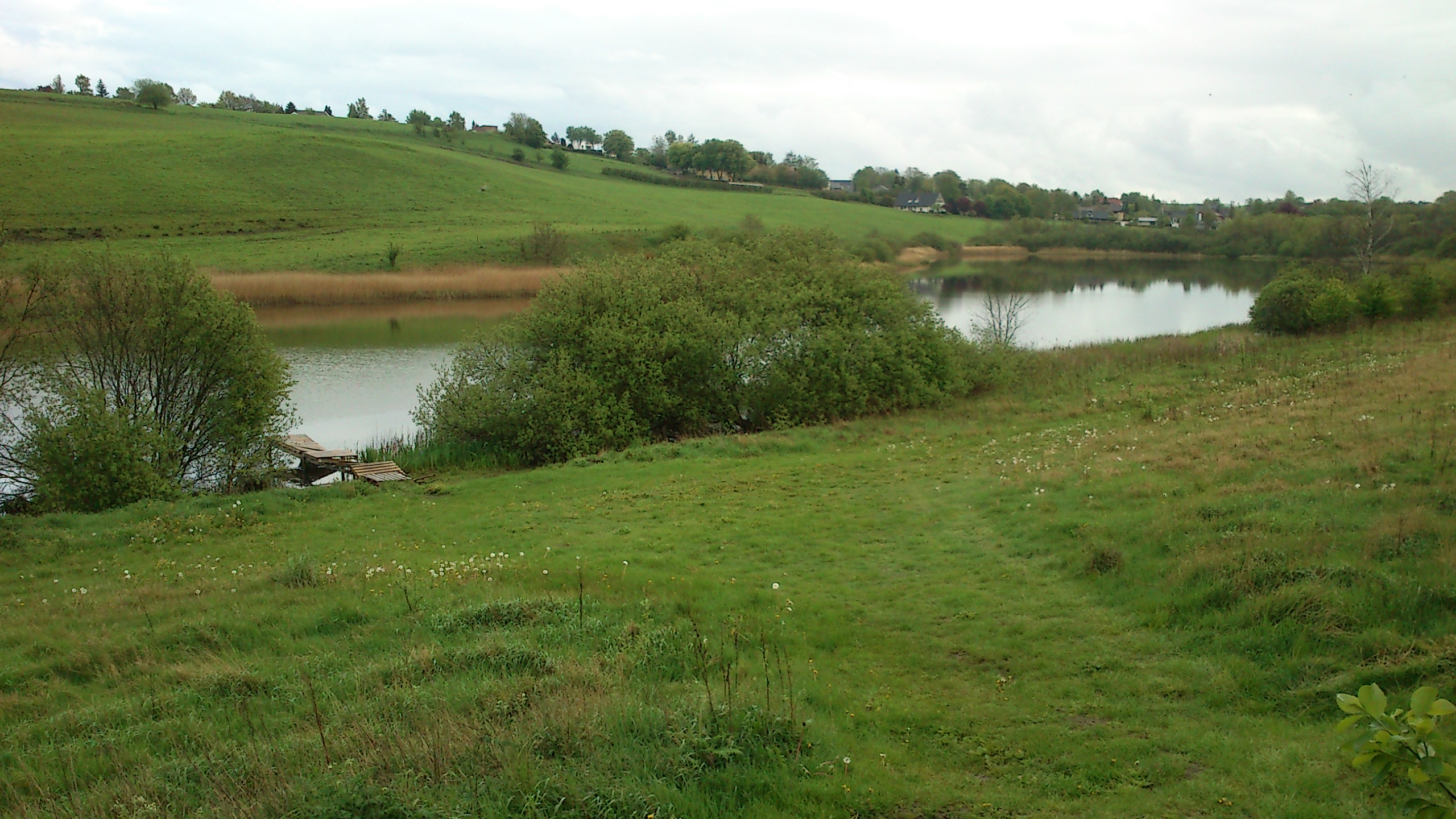
The lake of Geding Sø.
