= Nagin Ravand =

Danish-Afghan football coach (born 1999)

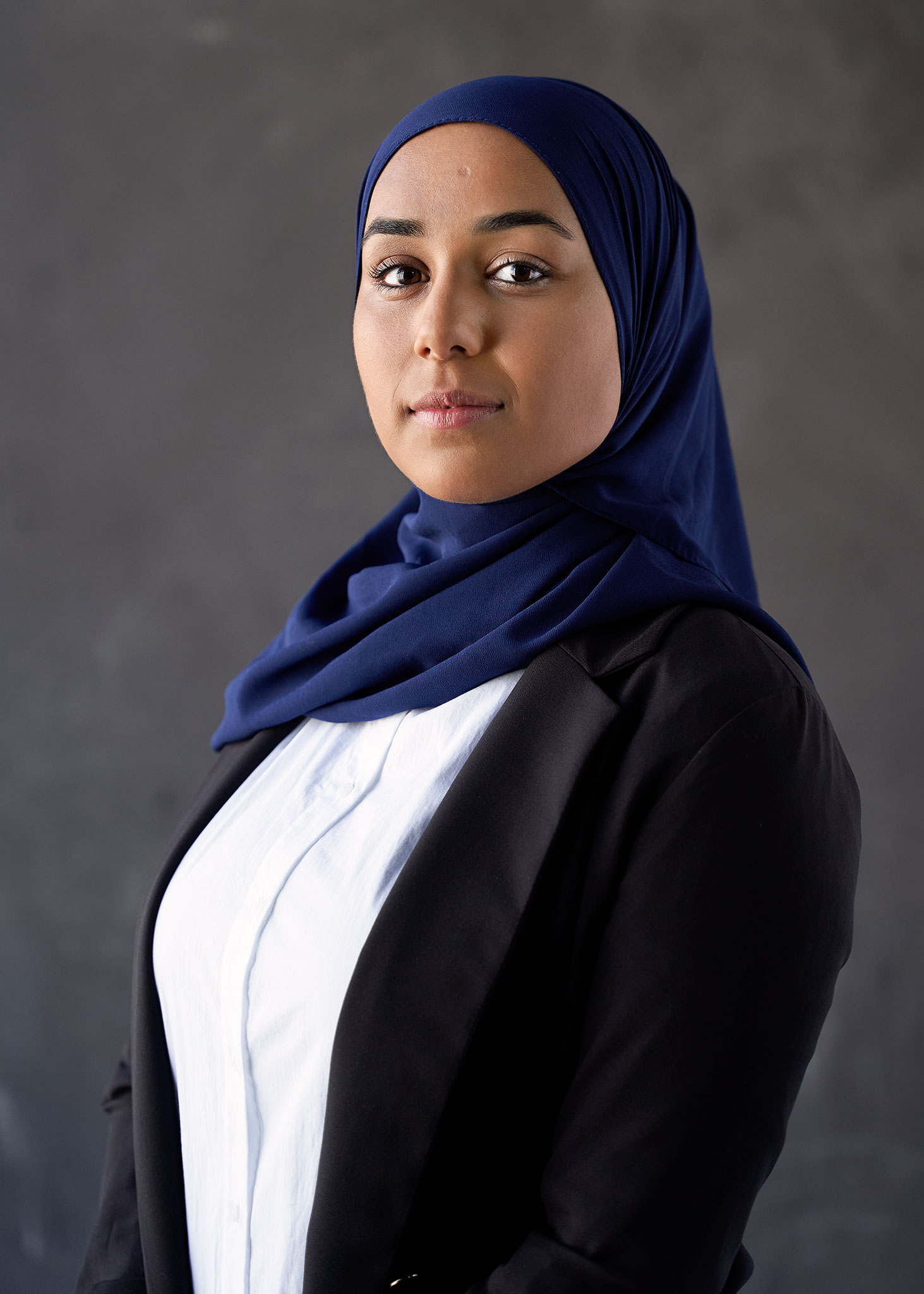
- Ravand in 2021
- Born: 16 June 1999 (age 26)
- Education: Aarhus University
- Occupation: Association football coach

Nagin Ravand (born 16 June 1999) is a Danish-Afghan football coach.

== Early life ==
Ravand and her family immigrated to Denmark in the early 2000s when she was three years old. She spent much of her childhood in Nørresundby, where she learned to play football after friend took her to Lindholm IF at eight years old.

== Career ==
Moving to Gellerup in 2013, Ravand stated that she lacked the ability to continue playing football. She started working towards creating a team for girls in the area with non-Western backgrounds. At age 15, she was contacted by ACFC in Gellerup, who wanted to help her start a girls team with the club. She accepted the offer, despite no experience with coaching or knowledge of the club. At the time, she was playing for Brabrand IF. She also founded the football club Vatanspor, located in Brabrand.

Ravand has received several awards for her efforts. In 2020, she was honoured with the PlanBørnefondens Pigepris for her initiatives to make football accessible for girls with different backgrounds. The award was given in connection with International Day of the Girl Child by the United Nations. The Swedish Embassy in Copenhagen, in 2021, awarded her the Nordic Pioneer Prize for her efforts to tackle racism and discrimination in Denmark.

In September 2022, Ravand received the youth award at the annual Elle Awards. In October 2022, she was one of seven girls honoured as the director for a day in charge of the Danish Football Association, which included a meeting with Ane Halsboe-Jørgensen, who was then-Minister for Culture. She later joined the DBU's advisory board.

== Personal life ==
Ravand is a practicing Muslim, which she has stated is a large part of her life.
