= Tilst Church =

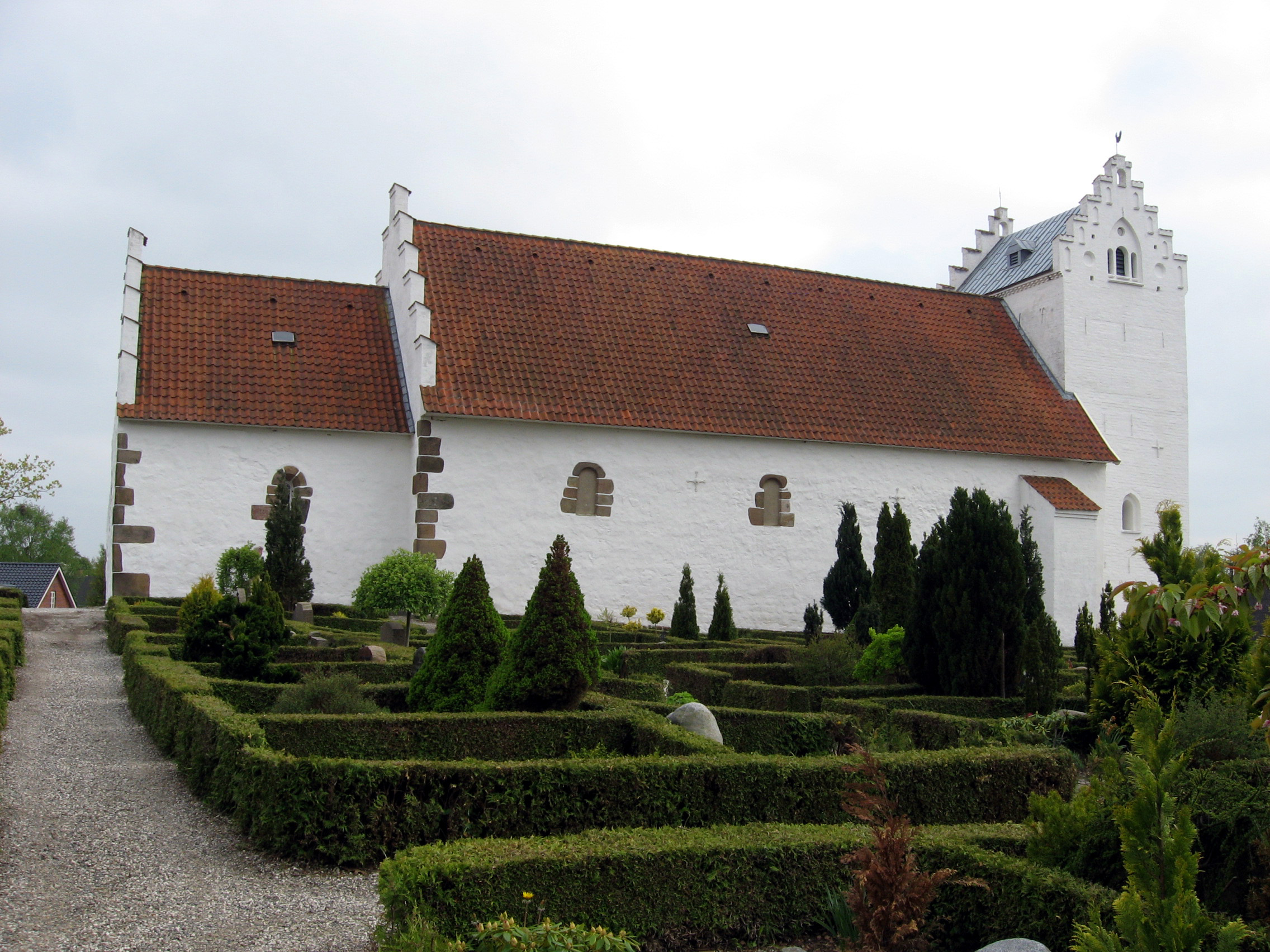
- Tilst Church
- 56.19296°N 10.1112°E
- Location: Aarhus, Denmark
- Country: Denmark
- Denomination: Church of Denmark
- Previous denomination: Catholic Church

History
- Status: Church

Architecture
- Architectural type: Romanesque
- Completed: c. 1170

Specifications
- Materials: Brick

Administration
- Archdiocese: Diocese of Aarhus

Tilst Church is a church in Aarhus, Denmark, situated in the suburb Tilst 8 kilometers north-west of Aarhus city center. Tilst Church is from the 1100s, erected as a typical Danish Romanesque village church. Later additions in the 15th century added a Gothic tower and porch. Tilst Church is the only church in Tilst Parish but it is a part of the Tilst-Kasted pastorate which includes Tilst and Kasted Churches. There were 5.163 members of the Church of Denmark living in Tilst Parish on 1 January 2016.

== Architecture ==
The original part of the church, the chancel and nave, probably dates from the latter half of the 12th century and is constructed of split and rough granite boulders. Ashlar is used at the windows, doors and the corners of the building. A couple of the Romanesque round-arched windows are preserved and the molded imposts in the doorways and chancel arch are retained. The original simple church had, as was usual, a wooden ceiling, but this was replaced around the middle of the 15th century by masonry vaulting. In the same Late Medieval period, which was characterized by considerable activity in church building, a porch was added in front of the nave's south door and later made higher in two stages. The tower, which like the porch is built of brick, must have been erected in the decades before the Reformation in 1536. In more recent times small repairs have frequently been undertaken, but have not made any essential change. The church was last restored 1959–60.

== Murals ==
The walls and vaulting of both the chancel and nave are decorated with Late Gothic murals from c. 1450–75. The simple paintings of the vaults correspond to those of the Aarhus Cathedral and a number of the village churches in the surrounding districts. The walls in the church were almost entirely decorated with imitations of tapestry, and above this in the chancel and on the north and south walls of the nave are painted various scenes. The greater part of these survive only in fragments. The north and south walls of the chancel had a frieze of the Apostles, while those of the nave have scenes from Christ's Passion within an architectonic framework of two stories. A grimacing jester can be seen just inside the south entrance to the church.

== Furniture ==
A Romanesque baptismal font with twin lions on the basin is among the earliest furniture of the church. Some of the pews from 1890 have pinewood bench-ends from 1584 with rustic decoration in low relief. Other bench-ends with the date 1684 and inscriptions presumably came from a parish clerk's seat in the church. Several Baroque tombstones were probably obtained from various churches around Aarhus and then modernized and given new inscriptions.
