= Geding Lake =

- Geding Sø
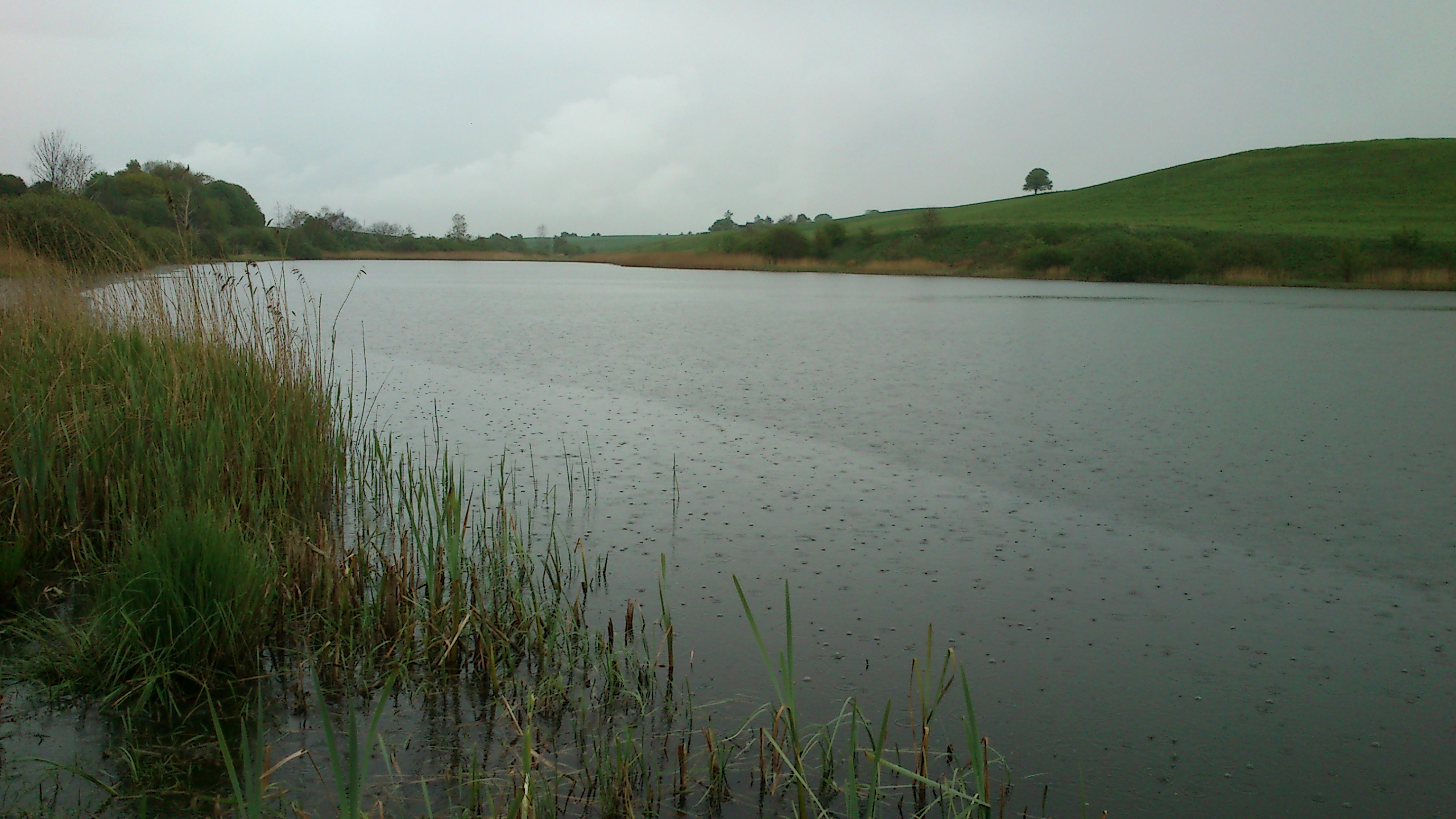
- View from the westward shore across the northern end of Geding Lake

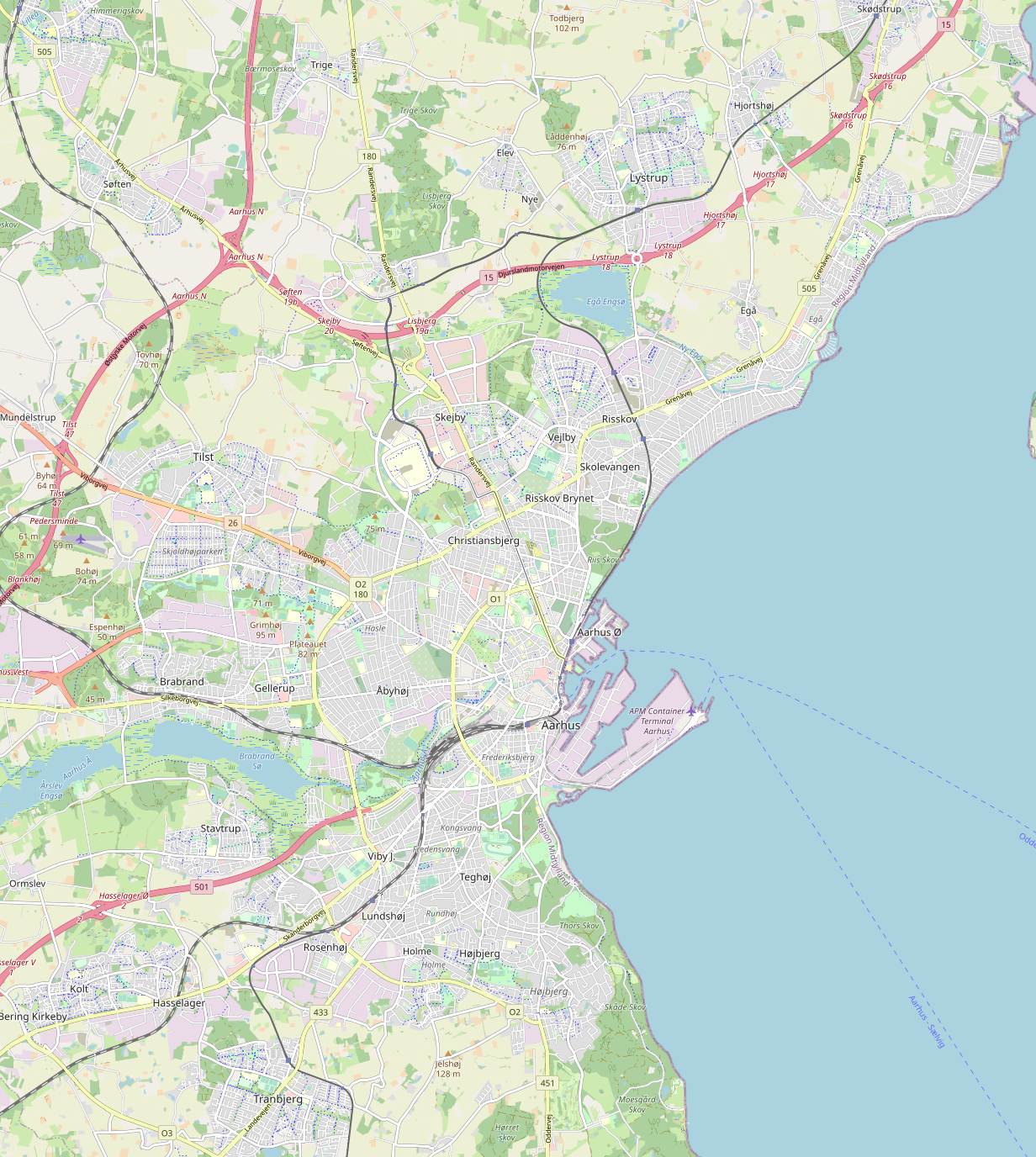
- Location within Aarhus
- Location: Aarhus Municipality, Denmark
- Coordinates: 56°11′44″N 10°05′22″E
- Type: Lake
- Primary outflows: Egå
- Max. length: 3 kilometres (1.9 mi)
- Max. width: 700 metres (2,300 ft)
- Surface area: 5.8 hectares (14 acres)
- Average depth: 2 metres (6 ft 7 in)
- Max. depth: 3.7 metres (12 ft)
- Water volume: 100,460 cubic metres (3,548,000 cu ft)

Geding Lake (Danish: Geding Sø) is a lake west of the Aarhus suburb of Tilst in Aarhus Municipality, Denmark. The stream Egå and the Egå river valley begins here. The lake is bounded by the Aarhus–Randers railway line to the west.

Geding Lake is also known under the older name Gjeding Sø. The lake is connected to a myth and folk story stating that Geding Lake, Brabrand Lake and Lading Lake was created during a battle between two giants that lived in the hills Hasle Høj and Borum Eshøj.

Until 1997, the hills on the eastern side of the lake were used for skiing including a ski lift provided by Aarhus SKi Club, but due to lack of snow for years these activities have stopped.

== Environmental conditions ==
Geding Lake is rich in calcium. The ecosystem of the lake has experienced problems with heightened levels of chlorophyll some 3 times higher than the targeted levels. The catchment area is fairly small at just a few square kilometers so the inflow of phosphorus and nitrogen is relatively small compared to other lakes in Denmark but is still deemed too high and the surrounding agricultural areas would have to decrease runoff to the lake by some two kilograms annually to reach environmental targets. Over time it may be necessary to undertake a restoration project to return the lake to its natural condition.

The neighboring Mundelstrup Stationsby has experienced a major pollution event from the fertilizer factory Mundelstrup Gødningsfabrik which was active in the area from 1870 to 1904 when it burned. The factory caused major pollution with heavy metals in Geding Lake, Geding-Kasted Bog and the river Egå, in particularly with arsenic. The factory has closed, the migration of heavy metals to waterbodies in the area has stopped and it is expected that the levels of arsenic will now decrease over time. However, the lake sediment still contains high levels of the poison and Geding Lake is under continued observation for this reason.

== Gallery ==
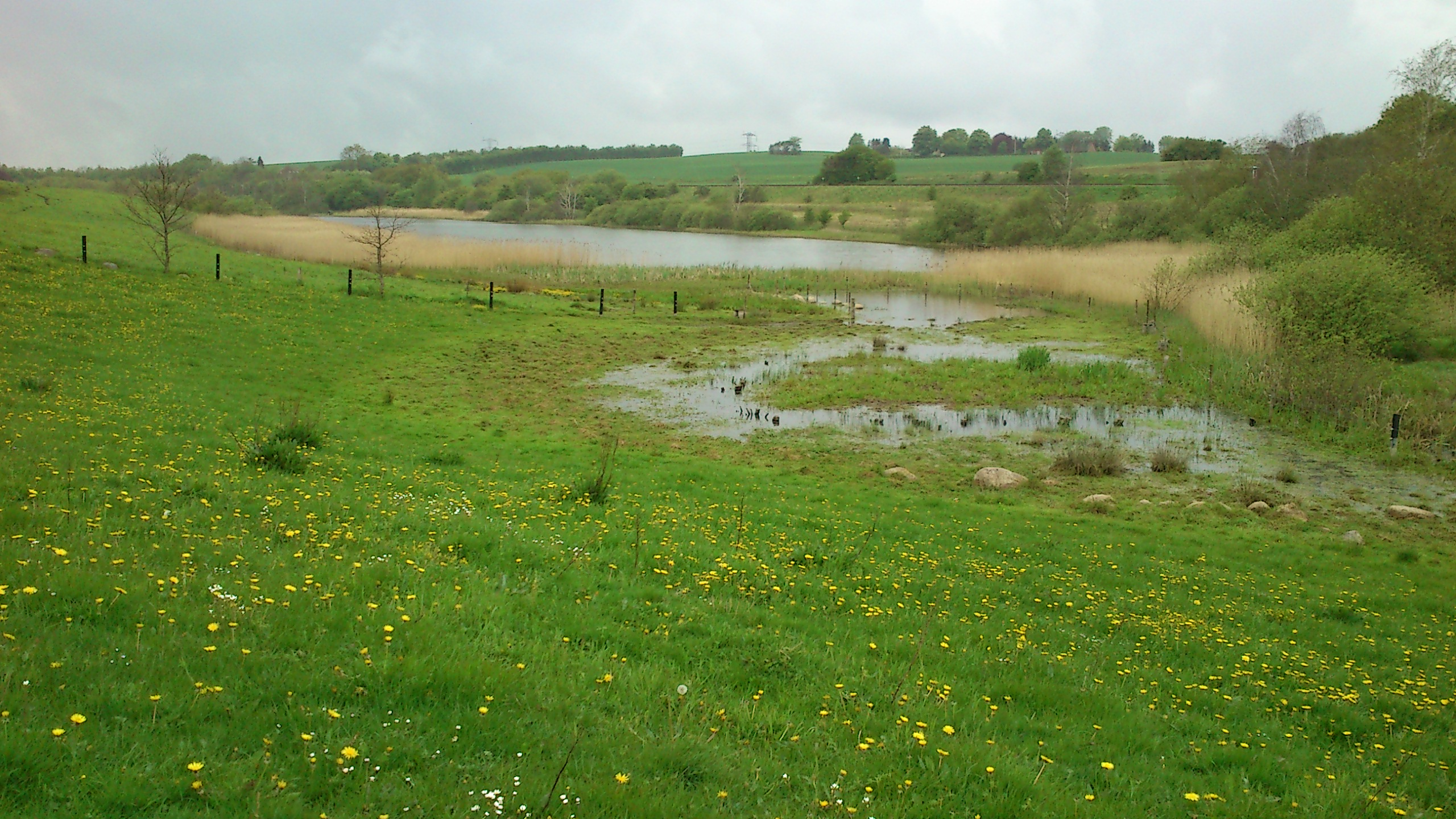

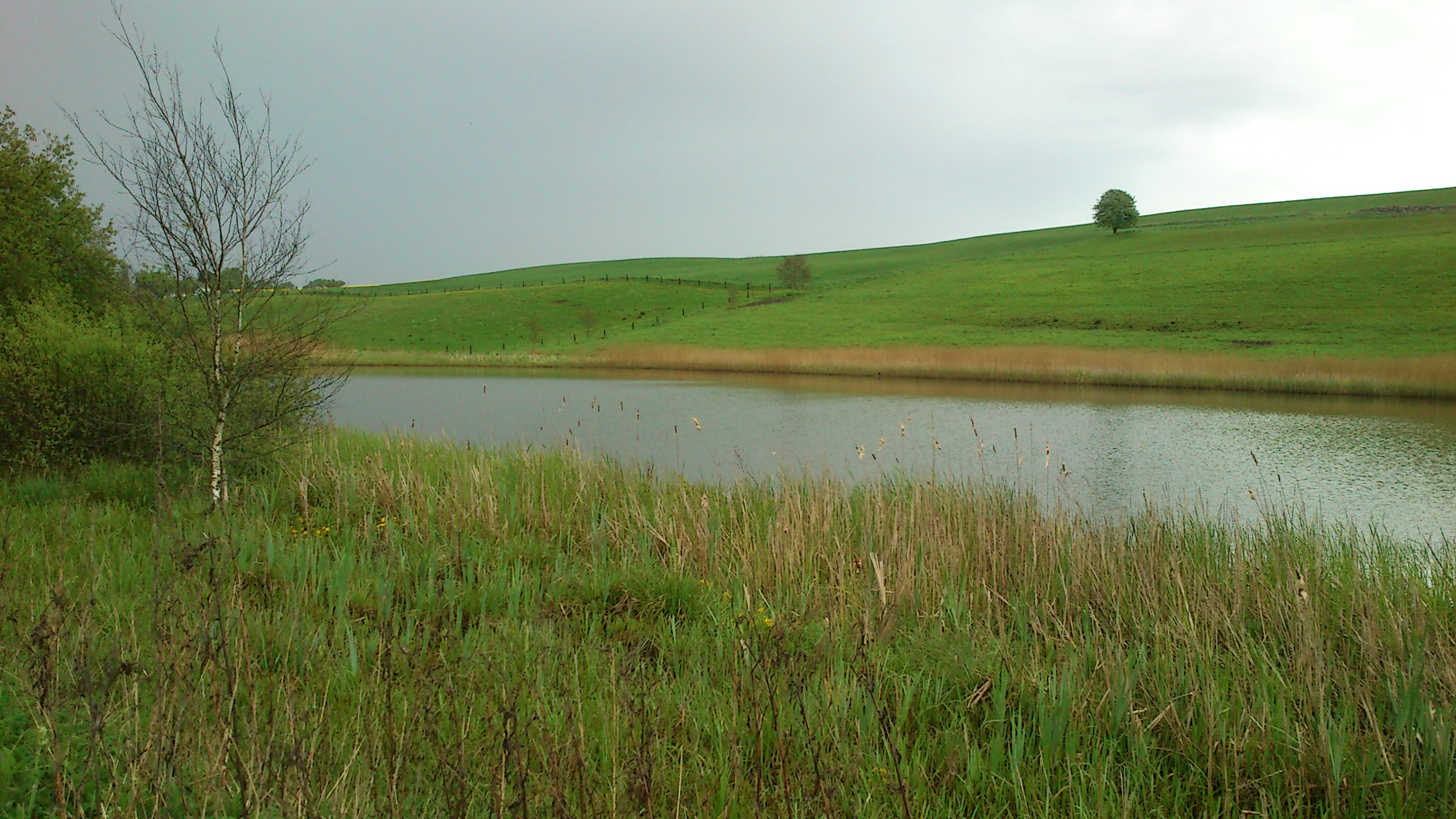

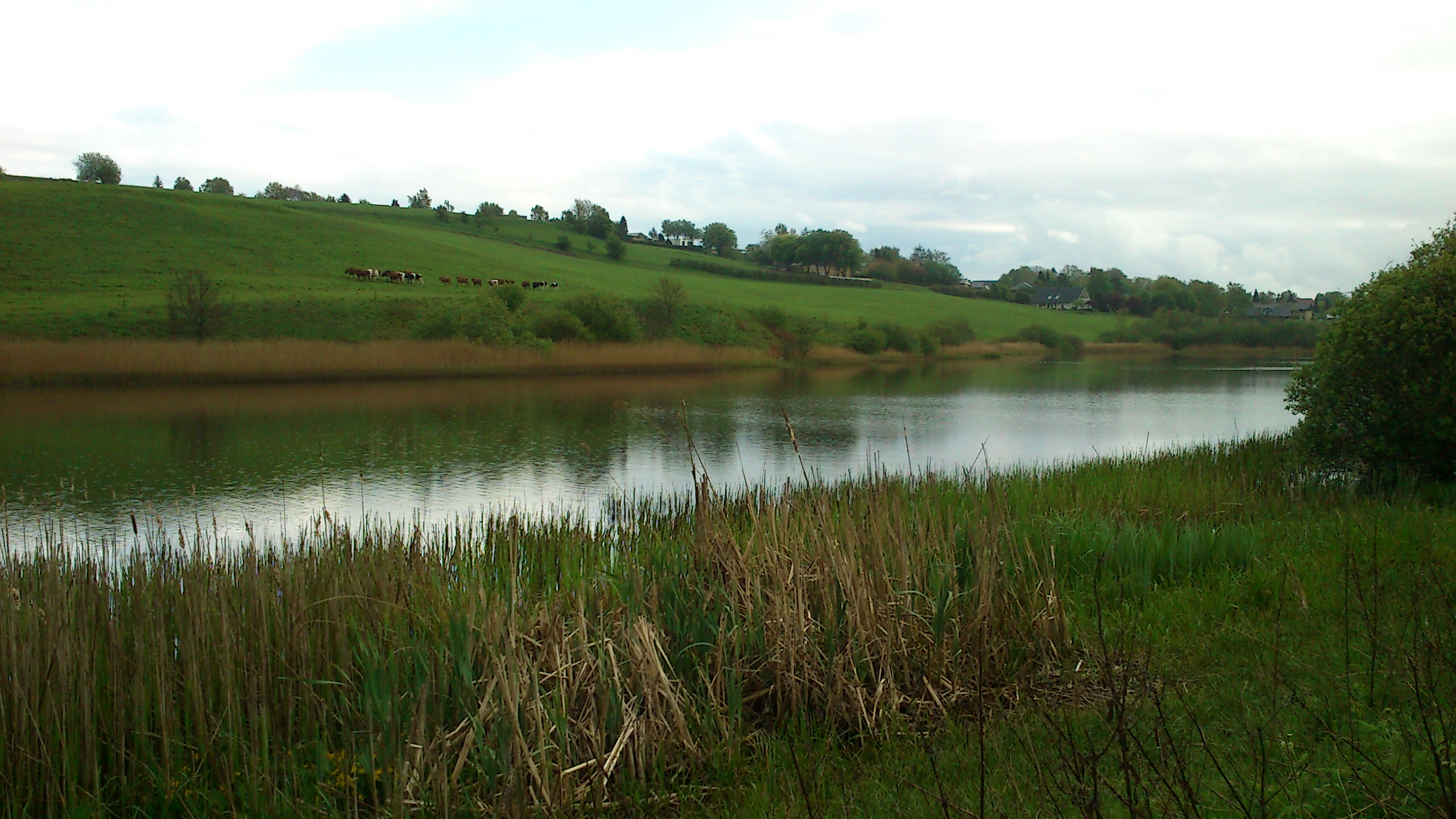

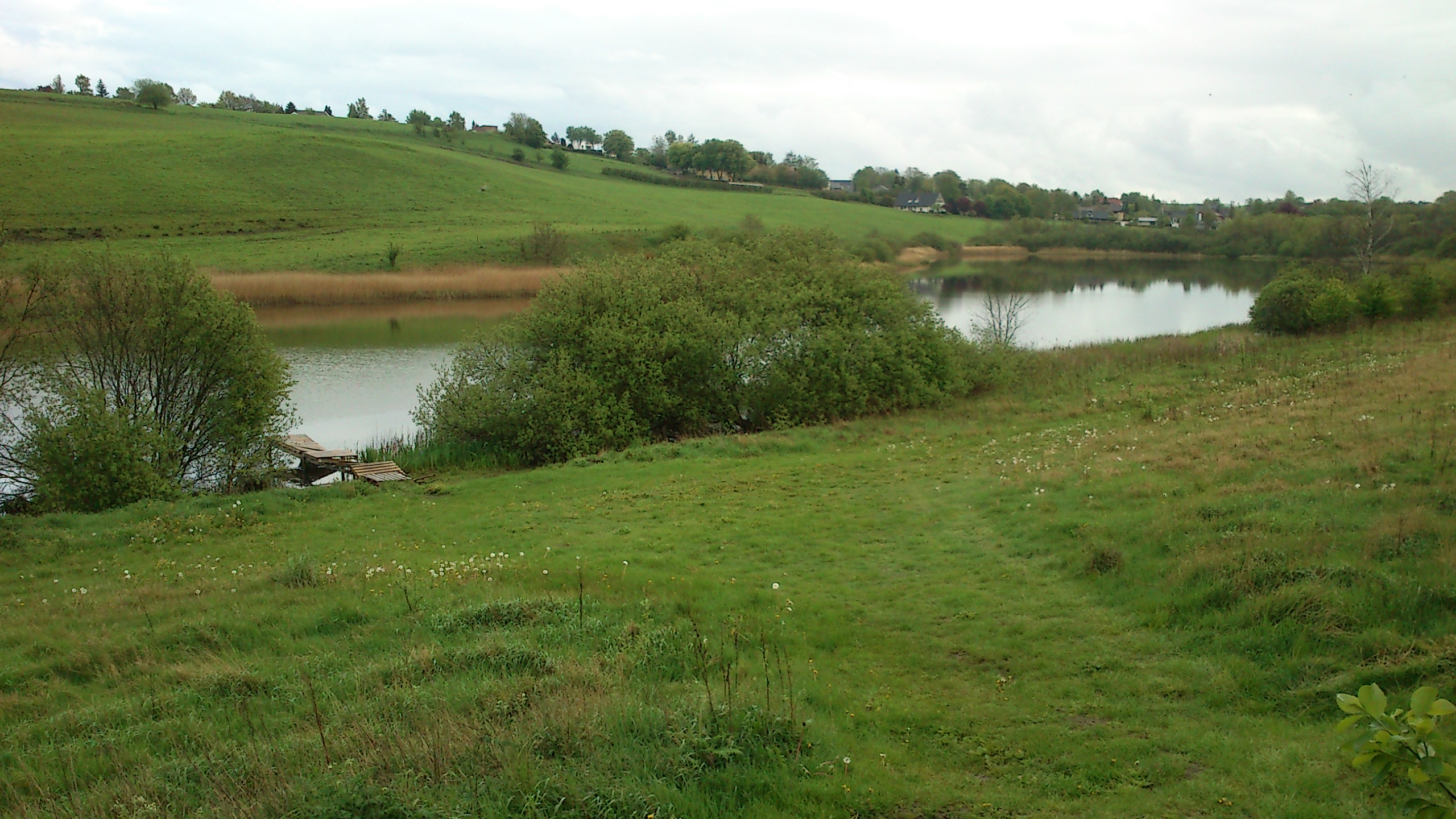
