= Architecture of Aarhus =

The architecture of Aarhus comprises numerous architectural styles and works from the Middle Ages to present-day. Aarhus has a well-preserved medieval city center with the oldest dwellings dating back to the mid-1500s and some ecclesiastical structures such as St. Clemen's Cathedral and numerous smaller churches that can be traced back to the 1100s. The industrialization of the 19th and 20th centuries left distinctive industrial structures, important National romantic works and some of the best examples of Functionalist architecture in the country. The history of the city as a Viking fort is evidenced in the street layout of the Latin Quarter, the wider Indre By neighborhood testifies to its later role as a Market town and center of commerce while the Frederiksbjerg, Trøjborg and Marselisborg districts showcase the first cohesive urban planning efforts of the early 20th century.

== Geography ==
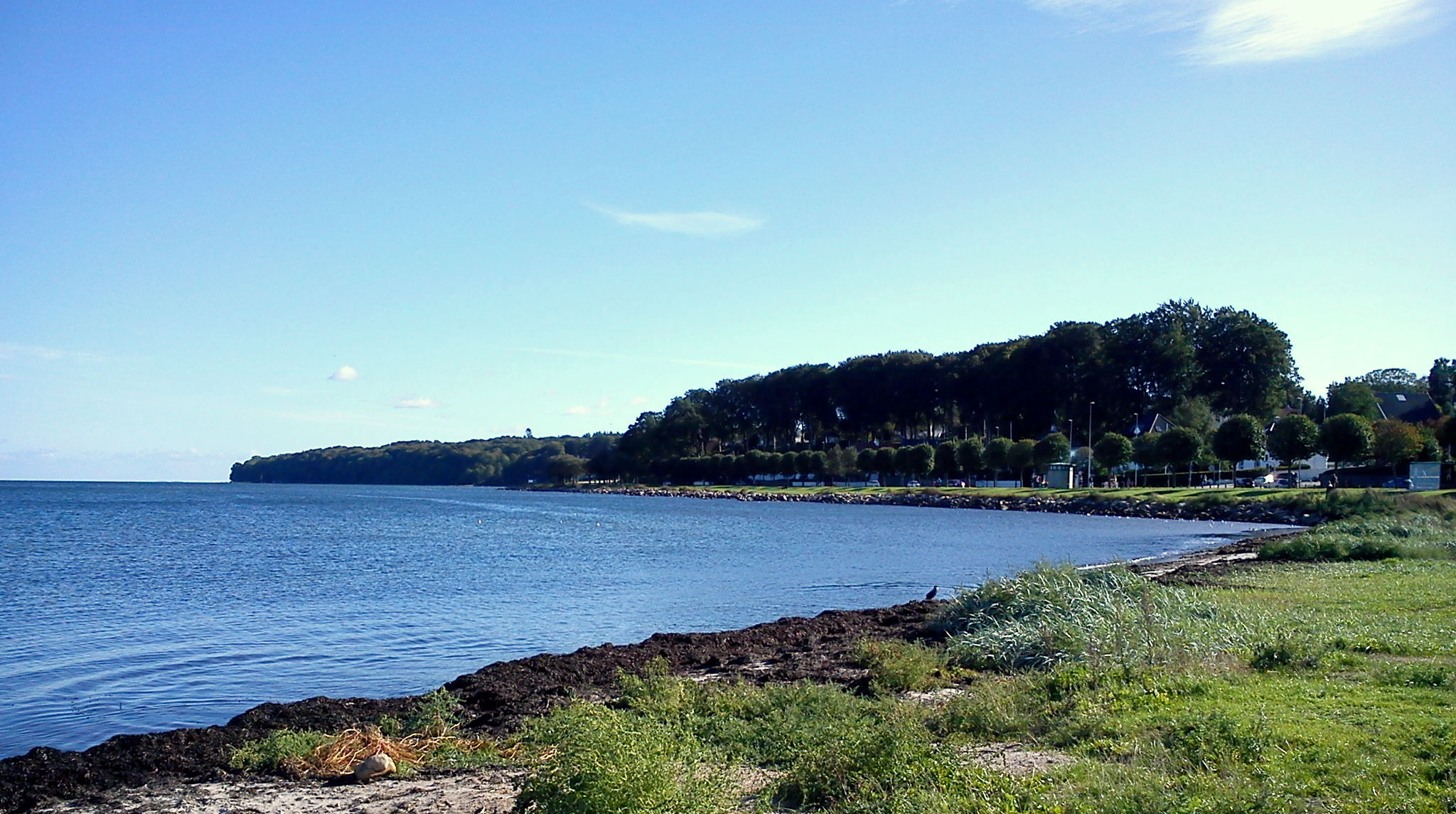
Curving coastline of the Bay of Aarhus against the steep southern hills

Aarhus is located on the coast in the Bay of Aarhus by the outlet of the Aarhus River where it straddles the hills of forested river valley. It faces the Kattegat in the east, the Brabrand Lake to the west, Riis Forest to the north and the Marselisborg Forests to the south. Aarhus was founded on the north shore of a brackish fjord which over time has sedimentet into a river and lake. The bay provides a natural harbour with a depth of 10 m (33 ft) close to the shore which provided a natural, shielded harbor. Combined with fertile agricultural hinterlands the harbor, and later industrial port, is inextricably linked to the history of Aarhus and her development.

The hilly area consists of a morainal plateau from the last ice age, broken by a complex system of tunnel valleys. The most prominent valleys of this network are the Aarhus Valley in the south, stretching inland east–west with the Aarhus River, Brabrand Lake and Tåstrup Lake and the Egå Valley to the north, with the stream of Egåen, Geding-Kasted Bog and Geding Lake. Most parts of the two valleys have been drained and subsequently farmed, but recently some of the drainage was removed for environmental reasons. The valley system also includes the Lyngbygård River in the west and valleys to the south of the city, following erosion channels from the pre-quaternary. By contrast, the Aarhus River Valley and the Giber River Valley are late glacial meltwater valleys. The coastal cliffs along the Bay of Aarhus consist of shallow tertiary clay from the Eocene and Oligocene (57 to 24 million years ago).

=== Building materials ===
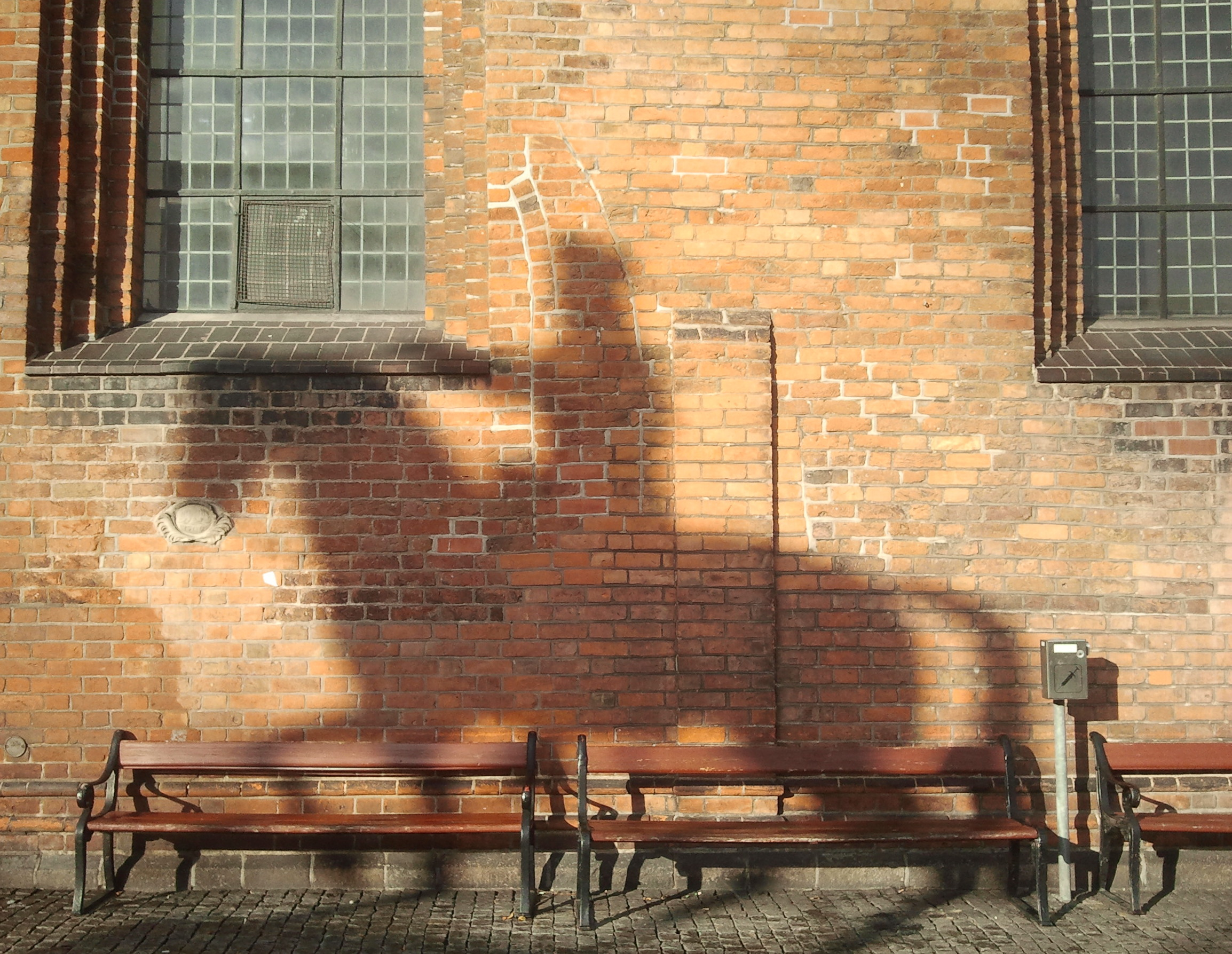
Brick is a common and traditional building material in Danish architecture, and it is prominent across Aarhus as well, in both old and new architecture. Here the Aarhus Cathedral in red brick.

The early Viking settlement consisted mainly of wooden structures and pit-houses of which nothing but archaeological artifacts remain. Wood was the primary building material through the Middle Ages except for ecclesiastical buildings. The first stone churches built in the 11th century were constructed of split and rough granite boulders, limestone, travertine or ashlar such as the crypt church in Our Lady's Priory from 1060. Production of fired brick began in the 13th century and Aarhus Cathedral can be said to be a product of the north European Brick Gothic style resulting from a lack of suitable natural materials commonly used in southern Europe.

Timber-framing was the most common construction method up to the Renaissance and the oldest such buildings date to the 1500s. There are numerous half-timbered structures from the 16th to 19th centuries throughout the city although many have had a brick building facing the street added later as the first fire codes were enforced in the 18th-19th century. Brick gradually became the predominant building material in the 19th century and most of the urban developments from the rapid growth during industrialization is of red brick. Characteristic for Aarhus is the use of yellow bricks in central neighborhoods and buildings such as the Central Station and the area around it including Park Allé, as well as Aarhus University. Reinforced concrete was used for the first time when the Five Sisters were erected in the late 1920s but it didn't become a widespread building material until the 1940s. In the mid-20th century more exotic materials gradually became popular and affordable such as the porphyry used in National Bank Branch in Aarhus from 1926, the Nexø sandstone in St. Mark's Church from 1935 and the marble used for cladding of Aarhus City Hall from 1941.

== Styles ==
=== Prehistory ===
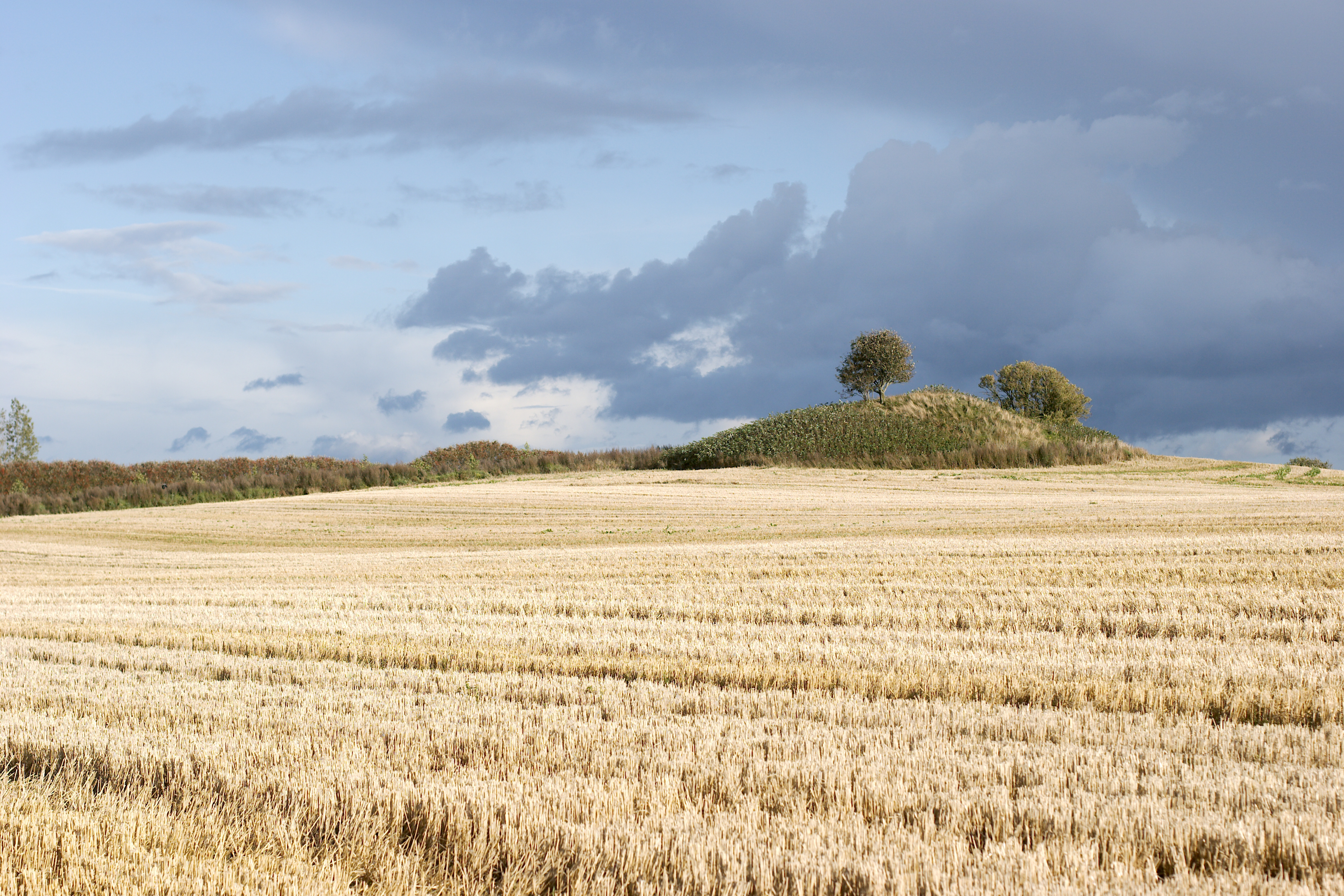
Tumulus structure at Borum

Archaeological finds indicate that the area around Aarhus may have been inhabited as far back as 100.000 BCE. Stone tools dated to 240.000 BCE have been found in Sønderjylland to the south indicating that the Neanderthals at least strafed the Danish area. More recent artifacts dated to around 100.000 BCE have been found in Himmerland to the north and Lillebælt to the south-east. However, the Weichselian glaciation made it impossible to inhabit most of Denmark between 70.000 BCE and 13.000 BCE as glaciers covered most of peninsular Denmark, including the east coast. Humans returned as the glaciers retreated and evidence points to a hunter gatherer culture until around 4.000 BCE when peoples from the south immigrated north and gradually introduced agriculture. The new agrarian lifestyle meant more permanent settlements and a population boom, starting the Neolithic period.

The area around Aarhus contains many structures from this period, primarily burial sites in the form of tumuli which was a common practice up to the Viking Age. Some 965 round barrows, 24 long barrows and 68 dolmens are registered by the Danish Heritage Agency spread out across Aarhus Municipality. In the early Neolithic the tumuli were simple; a small stone chamber with a single stone for a roof and then covered in earth. Later versions featured larger chambers, passage graves, which could be re-used multiple times. Weathering and ploughing have over time worn down many of the structures but they were officially protected by law in 1937 and remain an omnipresent part of the surrounding landscape.

=== Viking settlement ===
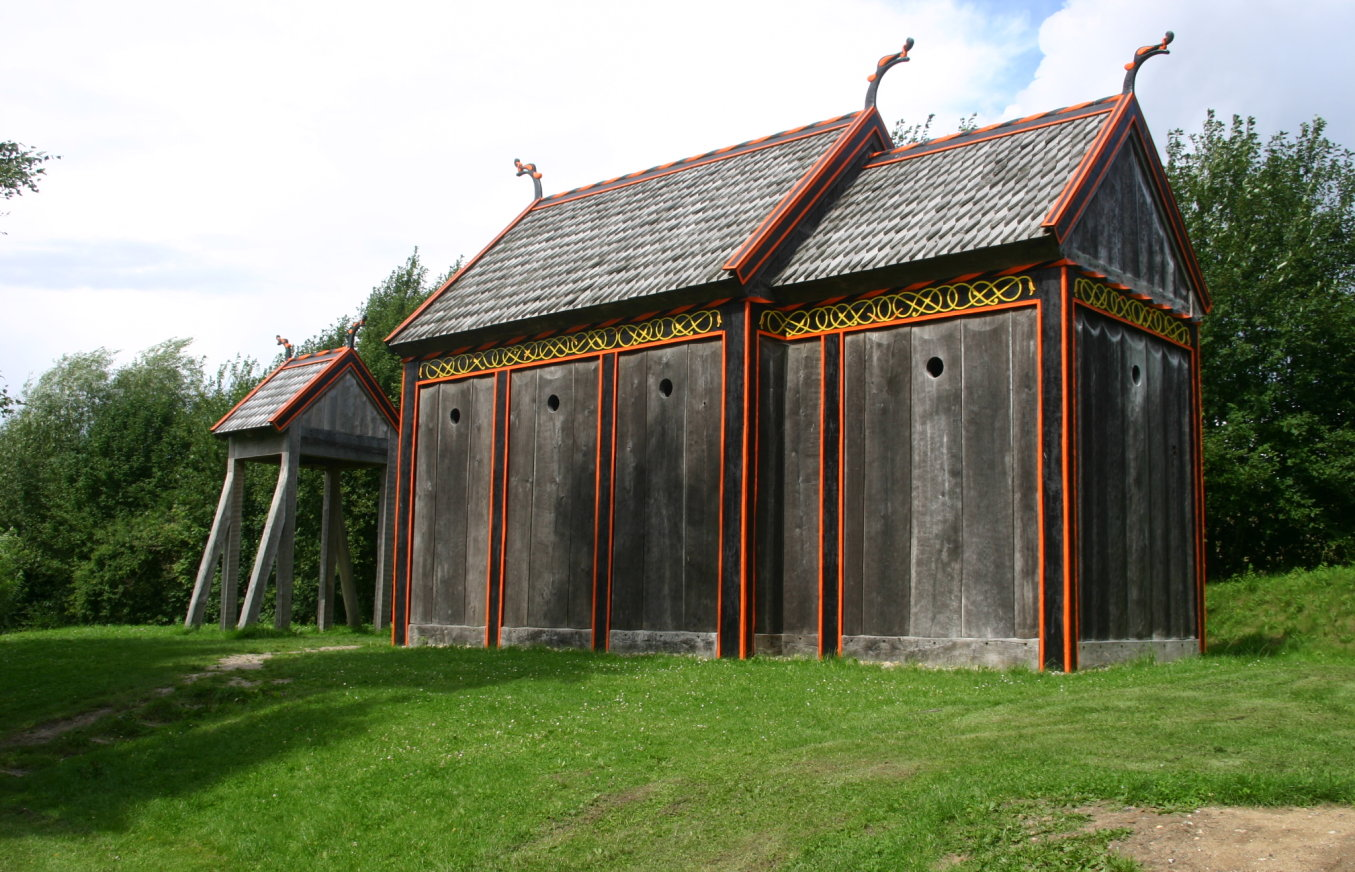
Stave church reconstruction at Moesgård Museum

The early Viking Age settlement was founded on the northern shore of a fjord at the outlet of the Aarhus River. The settlement consisted of pit houses as well as some wooden buildings such as longhouses. Most buildings were about 5 meters by 10 meters and likely had fenced areas for animal husbandry or small-scale farming. Most buildings were built around a wooden frame filled out wattle and daub style and then plastered in mud for protection. Floors were commonly made of wooden planks although some also had simple stamped dirt floors. Straw and reed was the usual material for roofing but turf was also used as well as wood chips in some exclusive buildings. No extant structures remain from this period but there is archaeological evidence both in and around Aarhus. The initial settlement was laid out in elongated fashion along the fjord from Immervad in the west, which functioned as a ford, to the coast in the east where the city bent northwards along the coast towards Riis Skov. North and west of the settlement by the fjord and coast lay a pagan burial site where Bispetorv is today. The fjord further to the west in Viby was the primary harbor where ships were stored in safety from seaborne attacks in close proximity to the king's estate.

In the early 900s Gorm the Old fortified the town with earthen ramparts and a moat, likely in response to the loss of Hedeby and Danevirke. The moat surrounded an area around present day Store Torv and Aarhus Cathedral marked by the streets Graven (Lit. Moat) to the north, Volden (Lit. Rampart) to the west, the fjord to the south and the coast to the east. During the rule of Harald Bluetooth in the 900s the first wooden church was built to the west of the fortified town and in 1070 it was replaced by the travertine St. Nicholas Church. In the late 1000s St. Oluf's Church had been built to the north of the city walls and neighborhoods had grown up around the two churches while the pagan burial site within the walls had been converted to a Christian cemetery with a wooden chapel.

=== Medieval ===
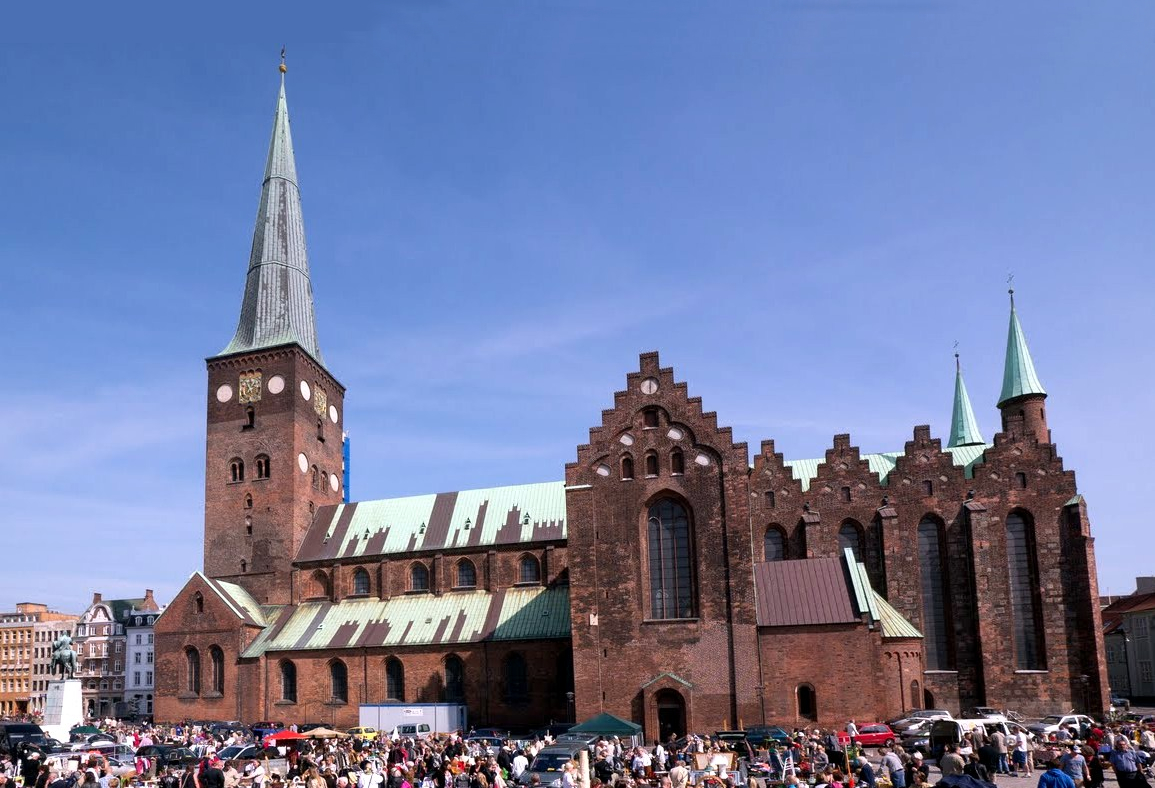
Aarhus Cathedral in Brick Gothic style

Romanesque architecture in Aarhus is mainly demonstrated by ecclesiastical buildings. The Church of Our Lady and Aarhus Cathedral (St. Clemens Cathedral) were built in the late 11th to 12th centuries in Romanesque style. The original cathedral had a deep choir with apse flanked by three chapels on each side. The chapels are still visible, showing the Romanesque pedestals, wall columns and rounded arches. The apse wall prominently display a Romanesque gravestone, most of the portals contain reliefs and the northern tympanum has a typical medieval motif. The Church of Our Lady occupies the site of the former late-11th century travertine St. Nicholas Church and its Romanesque crypt has been uncovered from under the choir. Aarhus also contains a number of village churches from the Early Middle Ages such as Brabrand, Egå, Hasle, Skejby, Tilst, Vejlby and Viby Church. The typical Romanesque village church consisted of a large church choir attached to a smaller nave.

Most of the Romanesque churches in Aarhus were later altered in the late Middle Ages in Gothic style. St. Clemens cathedral was modified in the mid-1400s in a hall church style; the choir and western section was rebuilt and made taller and a large tower, flanked by two chapels, was constructed at the western entrance. Rib vaults were added in the nave and choir and in the windows the Romanesque rounded arches were replaced with Gothic pointed arches. The steeple roof was also made octagonal which is a common feature in many Danish Gothic buildings. The many smaller Romanesque village churches were also changed and most had a tower and porch added along with Gothic style elements such as the crow-stepped gables on the steeples of Skejby, Vejlby and Egå Churches.

=== Renaissance ===
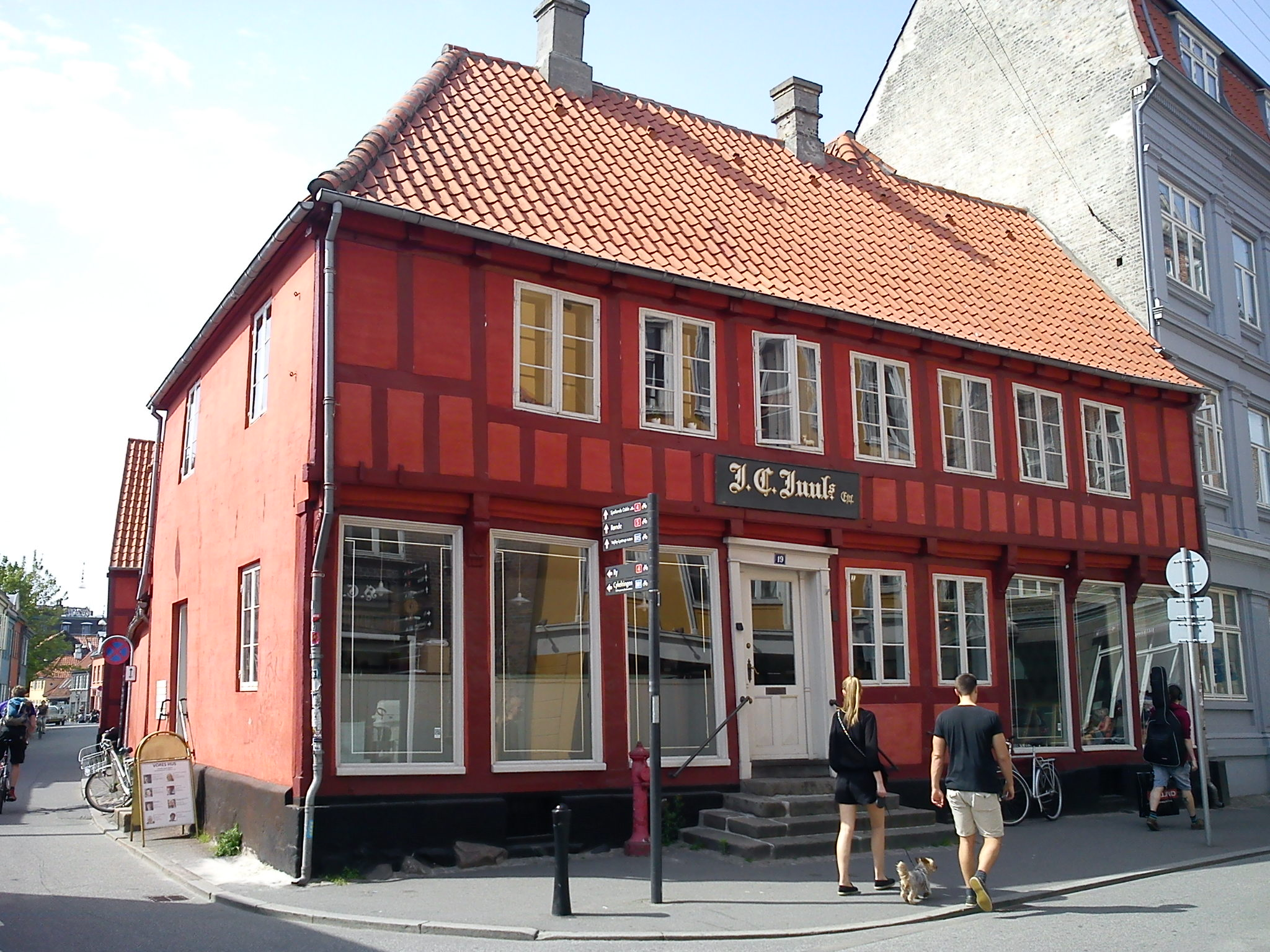
Juul's House is a well-preserved Renaissance house

In the years 1550–1650, or the Renaissance, Aarhus didn't expand much and space was plentiful so the tendency was to expand outwards rather than up resulting in a comparably flat skyline. Timber framing was the most common construction method for its cheapness and very few brick buildings were built until the 1800s. Aarhus was defined by its Market town stage and many expansive, multi-winged merchants houses were built at the ends of the main thoroughfares. In the 1500s merchants built around the ford at Immervad and the eastern section of Vestergade and in the early 1600s a new wave was built in the outer districts, at the ends of Vestergade, Studsgade and Mejlgade, the main access points to the old market squares Store Torv and Vesterbro Torv. The merchant houses were the largest and most significant buildings, home to the wealthiest citizens and many early workshops and small-scale industry. The best preserved example may be Juul's House from 1629 but Rosensgade 38 from 1600 is also symptomatic. Characteristic for these buildings is 2-4 wings surrounding a central court yard, 1-2 stories tal, often with stables, storage and workshops.

There are relatively few brick buildings from before 1720 left but Vestergade, Mejlgade, Studsgade, Klostergade, Skolegade, Mindegade and Graven contain the most examples. The timber-framed Vestergade 1 from 1540 and Mejlgade 25 from 1585 may be the oldest extant houses in the city. Characteristic for Vestergade 1 is the jettied upper floor which was common in the early half.timbered buildings. The Renaissance House from 1593 and the Mayor's House from 1597, both moved to the Old Town Museum, were two of the largest merchant estates in the city for centuries and both feature the typical jettied upper floor. Århus Mølle from 1700 is another building typical for the period.

=== Baroque and Rococo ===
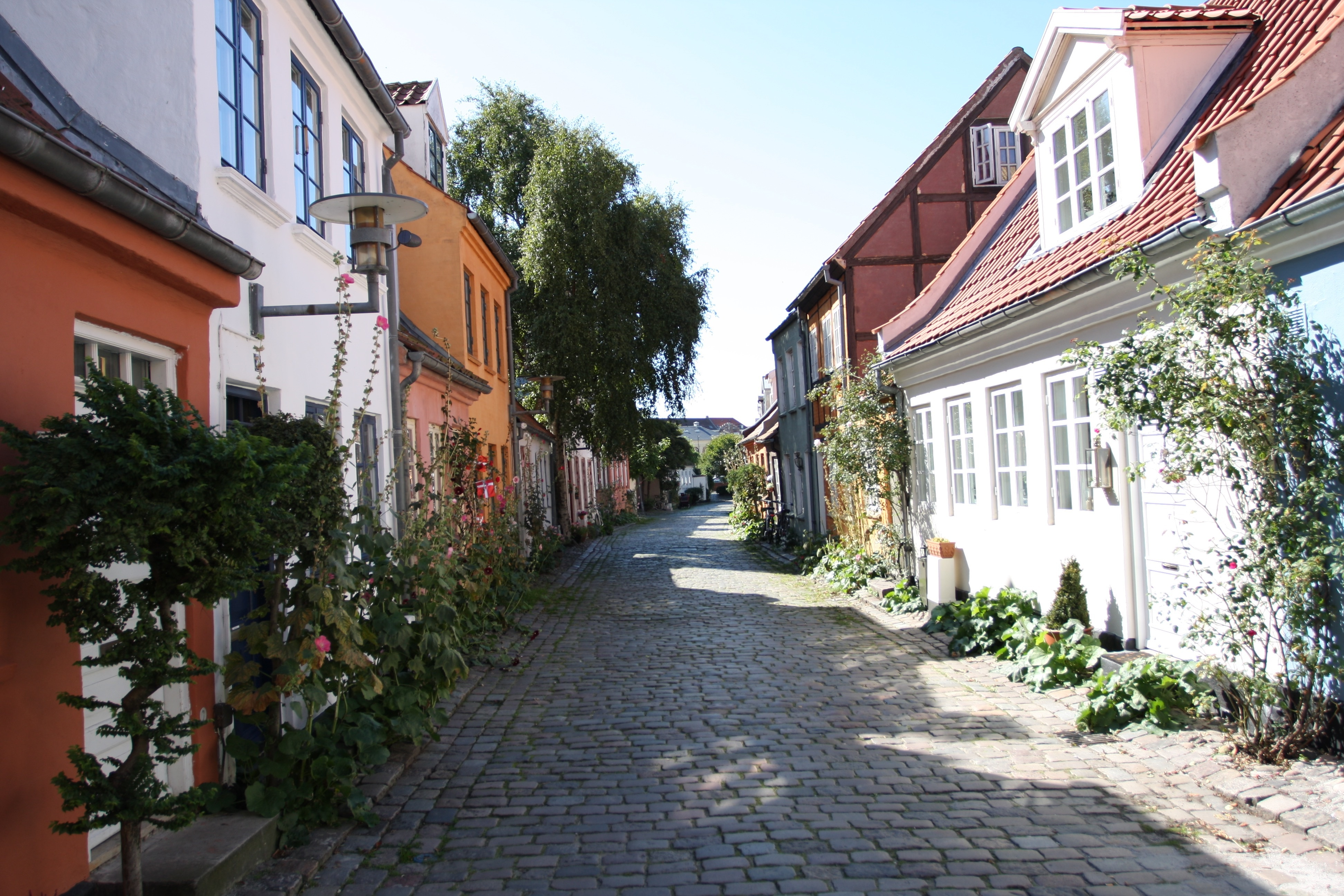
Møllestien with a preserved 1700s housing environment.

In the Danish provincial cities there are few major Baroque or Rococo works and in a Danish context Aarhus remained a mid-sized town up to the late 18th century and few large structures were built. Baroque and Rococo are mostly expressed in decorative details or interior design. Moesgård Manor was built in its present form in 1776-78 and appears mostly Neoclassical in style but it also has some Baroque features which show the transitional period during which it was built. Rococo in Denmark lasted for a relatively short period between 1740 and the 1770s and is mainly expressed in details such as doors, windows and interior design. Badstuegade 1 is a former warehouse but is the clearest example of Rococo in the exterior of a building in Aarhus.

The "white building" for Cathedral School from 1763 was initially built in a Classical style with Baroque style elements although it has since been substantially altered. The merchant class remained wealthy through the 18th century and this was reflected in their houses. Vestergade 58 from 1700 is a timber-framed four-winged merchant's house with a large interior courtyard typical for the period. On the other end of the social scale the most common form of living was lejeboder (Lit. Rental booths), very small houses. The only preserved example is Ridderstræde 4 but the small street Møllestien is a reasonable approximation of the types and sizes of houses the lower classes lived in at the time.

=== Classicism ===
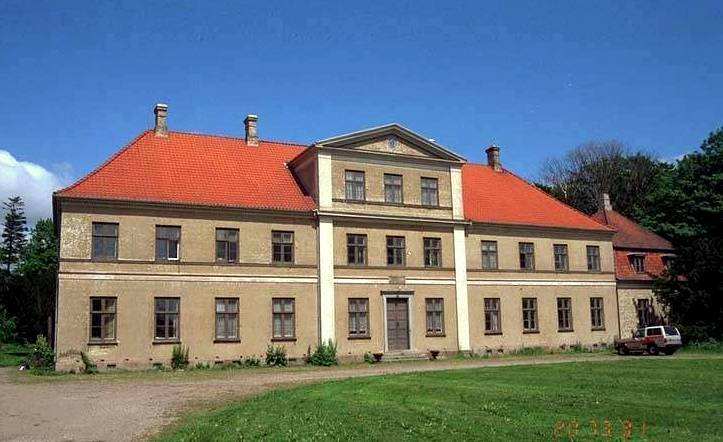
Vilhelmsborg Manor house

Construction with brick did not become widespread until the late 1700s which coincided with a period of classicist expression lasting from the late 18th to the mid-19th century. Typical for many classicist designs was the 3-parted facade; in larger structures the middle section was often formed with pilasters and triangular gables while smaller dwellings usually settled for minor decoration and ornamentation. The former widow's seat Trods Katholm is originally from 1606 but has since been extensively altered. Today it has a typical classical appearance with an accentuated, gabled middle section and a strong overall symmetry. The 3-winged building on Klostergade 56 has a classicist building from 1812 facing the street while the older buildings behind it are older timber-framed structures with Baroque features, an overall typical layout of many older houses in Aarhus. The rector building of Aarhus Cathedral School, Mejlgade 7, Badstuegade 1A and Mejlgade 45 are additional representative examples of classicist architecture in Aarhus.

In many buildings the classical expression was mixed with other styles. Meulengracht's House from 1816 on Lille Torv, Herskind's House from 1850 and Hans Broge's House from 1850 all feature a mix of classical architecture and Empire Style. Raae's House from 1798 may have been the earliest brick house in the city and has both Baroque and classical features. The late classical period produced the main building of Vilhelmsborg which is itself classical but is a part of a larger complex of farm buildings in Gothic Revival, the first of that style in Aarhus. Skolegade 34 is unique for its time, formed as a wedge between Skolegade and Åboulevarden, with a clean classical expression.

=== Revivalism ===
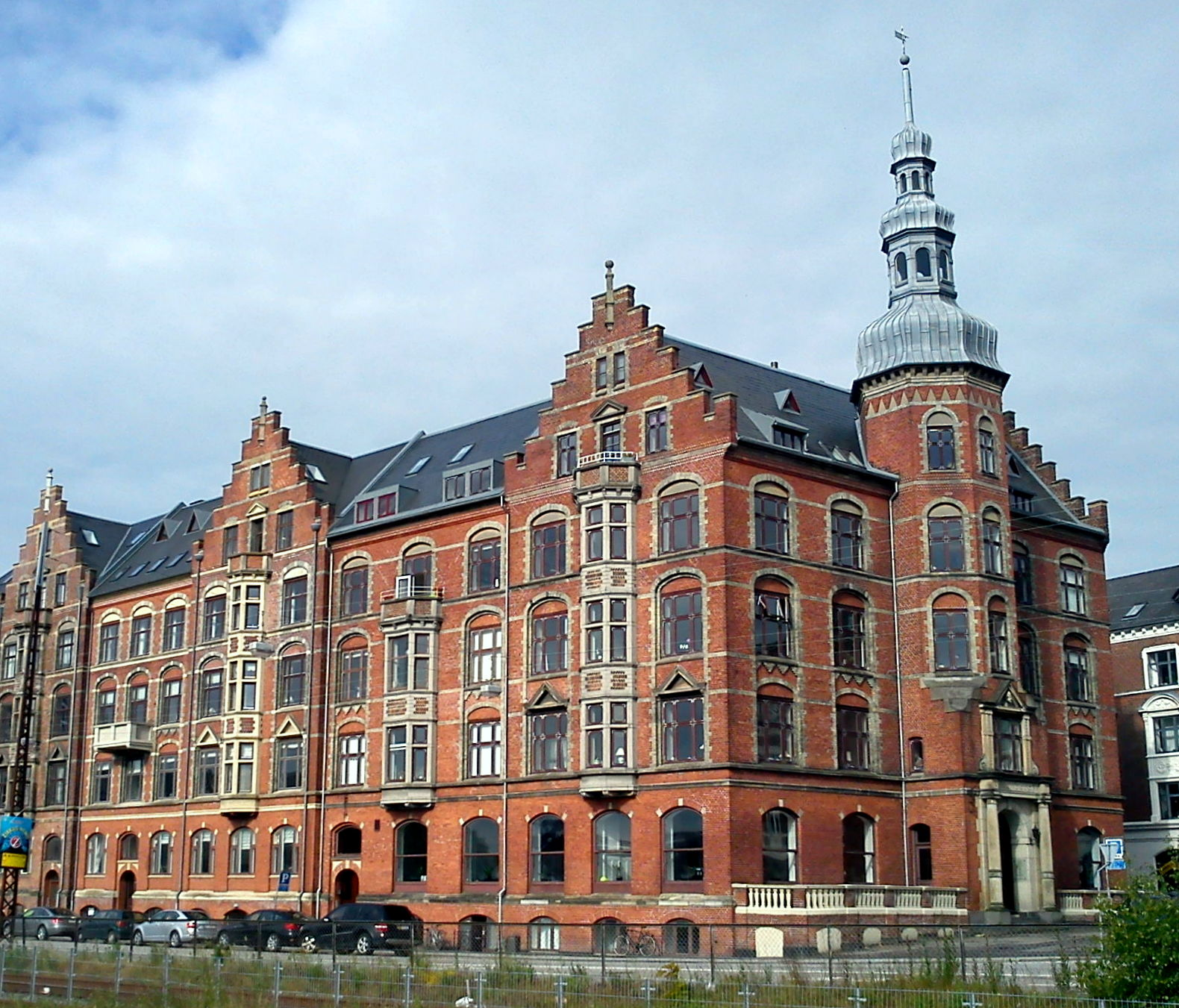
The Mejlborg building in Rosenborg-style

From the 1850s to the 1950s revivalist architecture became popular in Aarhus with some local quirks. Motifs from the Middle Ages and Renaissance were used liberally and brick facades left bare where plaster had previously been common. The German architect Gustav Ludolf Martens can be said to have introduced Gothic Revival architecture, if not to Denmark, then at least to Aarhus. Martens designed Willemoe's House in 1858 which became the first building to be built following the new ideals and may also be the best example of Gothic Revival in Aarhus. Many more structures were built in Gothic Revival; the most prominent examples may be Jydske Asyl from 1850 but Studestalden from 1865, Mejlen from 1883, Samsøgades School from 1914 and the farm buildings of Vilhelmsborg manor are also significant works.

Italian Renaissance architecture is demonstrated in several prominent structures around Store Torv; the Business- and Agricultural Bank of Jutland from 1900 and Domkirkepladsen 1 from 1926, which also includes some elements of English Baroque. The stately Rømerhus on St. Clemens Bridge also draws inspiration from the Italian Renaissance and was renovated and returned to its original expression in the 2010s. Between 1860 and 1900 the Rosenborg-style became popular in Denmark as a variant of Renaissance Revival that imitates Dutch Renaissance architecture. The Old City Hall is built in Rosenborg style and in Mejlborg it is combined with Gothic Revival. Other historicist buildings are Vester Alle 15, the Ceres Brewery buildings, Paradisgade 5-7 and Kannikegade 10.

The interest in revivalism also included ecclesiastical buildings and beginning in the 1870s a number of churches in Romanesque Revival were built including Åby Church from 1872, Holme Church from 1882, St. Paul's Church from 1887, St. Nicholas' Church from 1893, St. John's Church from 1905 and Aarhus Methodist Church from 1912. Lyseng Church was originally a Romanesque Revival chapel from 1913 which was converted to a church in 2010 with a new modernist building attached in front. Gothic Revival in churches is most prominently represented by the Catholic Church of Our Lady which was built in 1880 by designs of a German architect who had worked on the newly completed Cologne Cathedral. Frederik's Church from 1944 and Åbyhøj Church from 1945 both combine Romanesque revival with Gothic Revival.

=== National Romantic ===
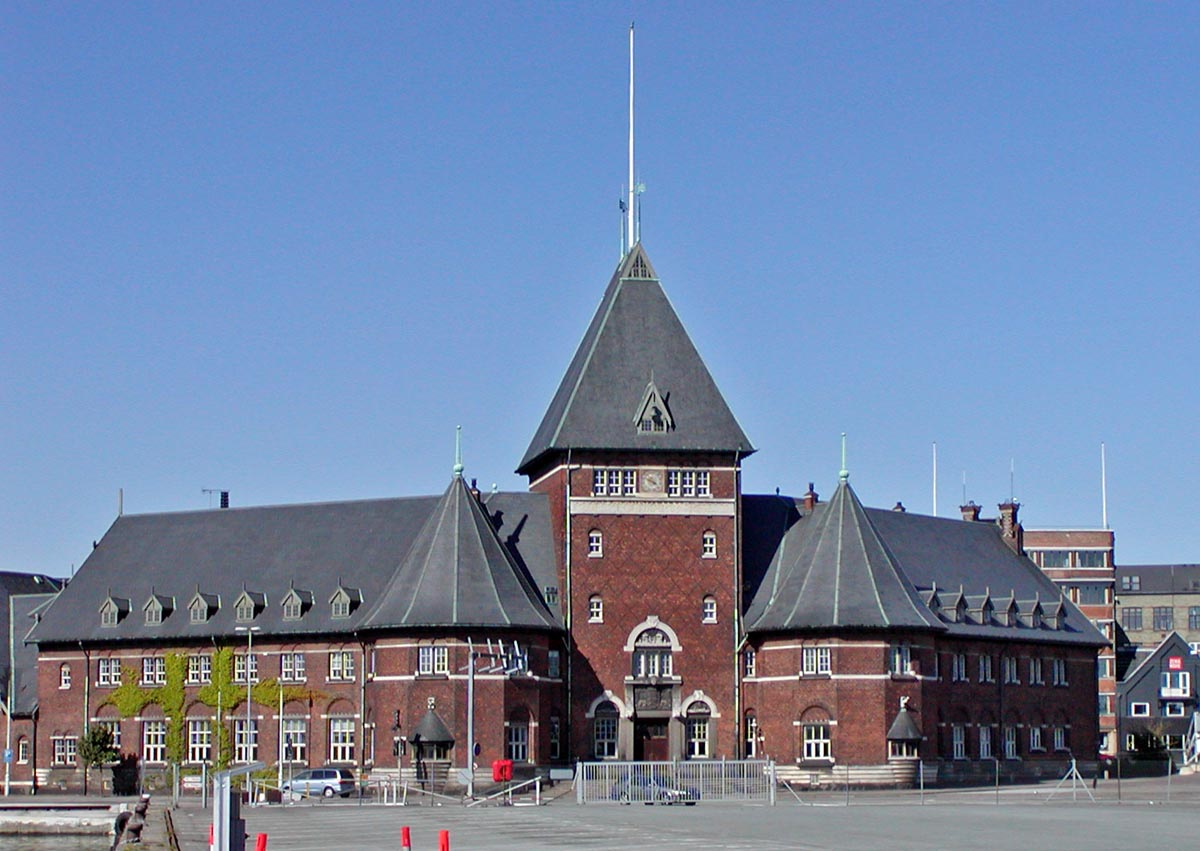
The Custom House is in typical National Romantic style

In the late 1800s to the 1910s a period of nationalism and interest in Nordic symbols resulted in the Art Nouveau variant National romanticism which is well represented in Aarhus. It is characterized by the use of domestic materials such as brick, limestone and granite and detailed exteriors. Aarhus Custom House from 1898, the former State Library from 1902 and Aarhus Theatre from 1900 stand as the centerpieces of National Romantic architecture in Aarhus. The Marselisborg Palace from 1902 is also a prominent example of the National Romantic style although the overall layout of the facade bears some resemblance to classicism. Both the custom house and Marselisborg Palace draw inspiration from the towers depicted in the Coat of arms of Aarhus.

Another prominent example is the stately Wormhus from 1884, the first block-style structure in the city, constructed as an angled building by St. Clemens Bridge. The Aarhus Fire Station from 1904 merges national romanticism with Renaissance Revival while the Ole Rømer Observatory from 1911 by Anton Rosen incorporates the Arts and Crafts movement. Many public institutions were built at time such as Aarhus Municipal Hospital of which the first building is in typical national romantic style, although later additions has turned the overall hospital complex into a distinct Functionalist expression. Many public elementary schools were also built at the time and Elise Schmidt's School, N.J. Fjordsgade School, Finsensgade School, Læssøesgades School and Paradisgade School all incorporate the national romantic style to some degree. Perhaps the best example of national romantic school architecture is the "red building" of Cathedral School, designed by Hack Kampmann. The Norwegian House constructed for the National Exhibition of 1909 may also be described as National Romantic although it was constructed as a demonstration project. Other examples are Sankt Lucas Kirkeplads 6–8, H. Pontoppidans Gade 18, Gerlachsgade 14 and Villa Kampen, originally Hack Kampmann's home.

=== Neoclassical ===
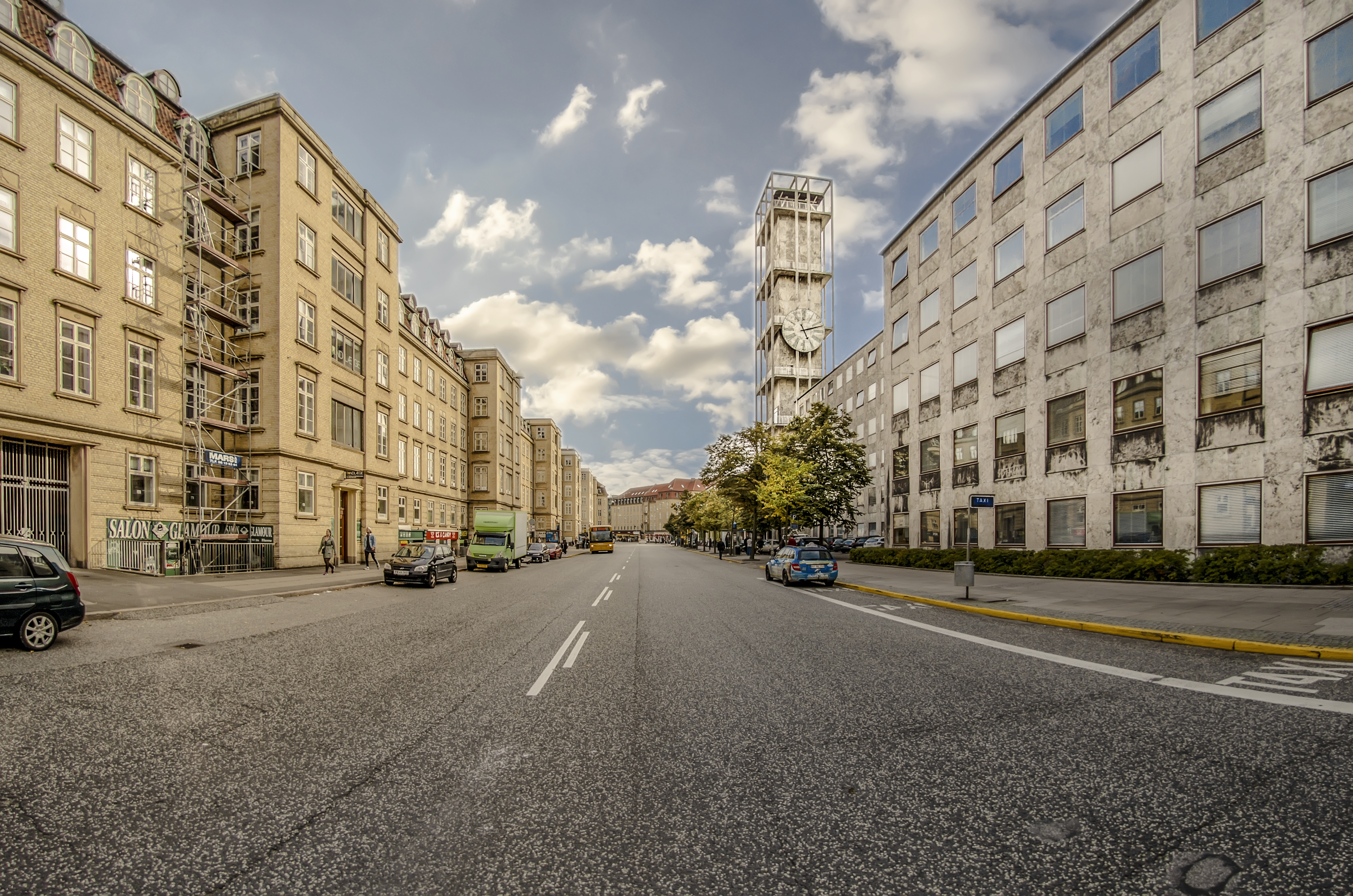
Park Allé and the area around it is in Neoclassical style

National romanticism was followed by a period of Neoclassicism as a reaction against the decorative and ornamental styles that preceded it. A new breed of young architects got involved in socio-political issues and sought to design neighborhoods, blocks, buildings and institutions in cheap but appealing ways. The style was characterized by clarity, logic and artistic cohesion with the works of the architect Christian Frederik Hansen as the model. Neoclassicism is well represented in Aarhus with the city center around the railway station having been built at this time along with a number of institutional buildings. Banegårdspladsen and the area around it including the Central Station are built in Neoclassical style as five-story yellow brick block buildings. The neighborhood Frederiksbjerg, planned and designed by Hack Kampmann and Einar Ambt in 1898, was erected quickly as large, continuous blocks in the spirit of Neoclassicism.

The most important individual works are Skansepalæet from 1908 by Hjalmar Kjær and the Spanien Public Baths from 1933 by Frederik Draiby. Varna Palæet in the Marselisborg Forests, built in 1908 by the architect Eggert Achen for the Danish National Exhibition of 1909, was initially lambasted as an architectural fusion of a Chinese pagoda and a Danish warehouse but has since become landmark in its own right. Other important works are Steen Billes Torv 12 from 1910 by Axel Høeg-Hansen and Christian Frühstück Nielsen, Kunsthal Aarhus from 1917 by Axel Høeg-Hansen and St. Mark's Church from 1935 by Thomas Havning. Aarhus Female Seminary from 1910 in Trøjborg is a rare example of a trend inspired by French palace-architecture with plastered, richly ornamented and clearly divided facades. Industrial works include the Five Sisters by Hjalmar Kjær, Stykgodspakhuset and the former administrative center for the Port of Aarhus on Slipvej 4.

=== Functionalism ===
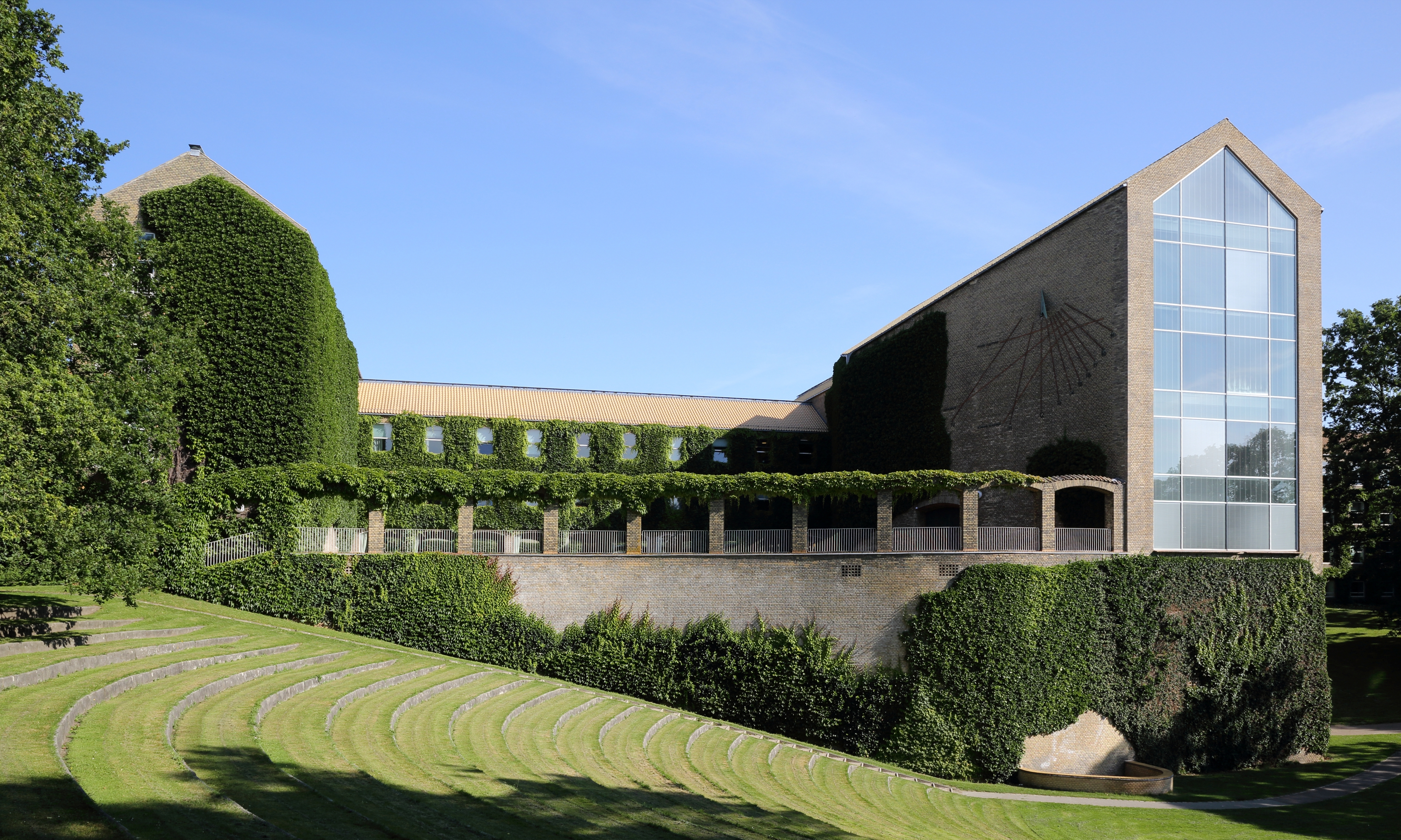
The University is one of the best examples of Danish Functionalism

The Stockholm Exhibition in 1930 had a large impact on architectural expression in Denmark, the ideals of historicism was largely abandoned in favor of Functionalist architecture. The use of decoration and ornamentation was diminished in favor of materials and functionality. There was a desire for a modern lifestyle expressed through form, function and technique. New concepts such as mass production was for the first time thought into new projects. Aarhus contains a number of important functionalist works.

The Aarhus University buildings from 1933 by C. F. Møller, Kay Fisker and Povl Stegmann is listed and a part of the Danish Culture Canon. The university buildings are laid out freely across an undulating landscape, constructed of light-yellow bricks. Aarhus City Hall from 1941 by Arne Jacobsen and Erik Møller is also listed and stands as the probably most recognizable landmark of the city; clad in blue-green marble with a very characteristic 60 m tall clock tower. Klintegaarden from 1938 by Hans Ove Christensen, also listed, may be the finest example of residential functionalist architecture in the city. It is a monumental apartment complex constructed of concrete elements, designed around a philosophy of communal and shared facilities. Strandparken from 1935 by Alfred Mogensen is another residential apartment complex and one of the first examples of free standing apartment blocks laid out in a park-like landscape which became a popular design in the years after. The former main library in red brick in Mølleparken, the Grey Building from 1957 by C.F. Møller at Aarhus Cathedral School, the tribunes for the Jutland Racecourse, Møllevang School and Skovvang School are other examples of functionalist architecture in Aarhus. Århus Statsgymnasium school from 1953 by Johan Richter featuring large ceramic artworks by native artist Asger Jorn, signals the emergence of modernism and the buildings have been listed since 2003.

=== Modern, postmodern and contemporary ===
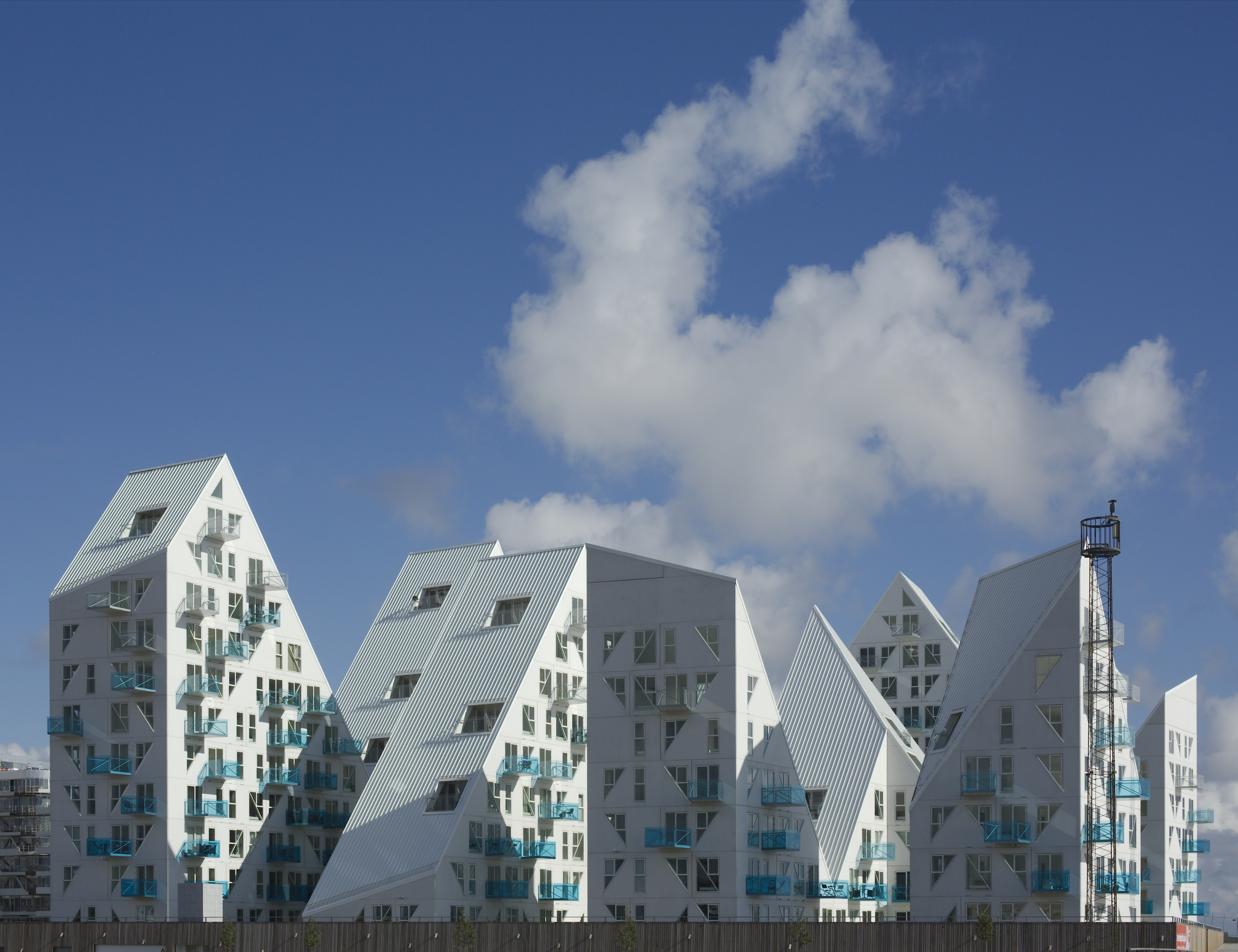
Isbjerget in the Docklands

From the 1960s to the 2010s many different architects and architectural firms have made their imprint on the city and created works of varying architectural styles. Højen 13 from 1958, is a listed villa created by the architect Knud Friis as his personal home and is one of the first examples of brutalist architecture in the city. Knud Friis' company Friis & Moltke later continued the style in and around Aarhus as exemplified by the Hotel Marselis from 1967 and Scanticon from 1969 with their raw exposed concrete structures. The late 1960s to early 1970s also produced modernist icons like the dormitories of Børglum Hall (1967) by Harald Salling-Mortensen and Skjoldhøjkollegiet (1973) also by Knud Friis and others. The Børglum Hall in yellow brick, draws inspiration from the Finnish architect and artist Alvar Aalto. The individual dormitory buildings are formed as petals on a stalk around a central community space and it remains a unique structure in the city. The 1970s and early 1980s, was a period of stagnation and major works from this period is limited. The Concert Hall from 1982 by Kjær & Richter had a unique expression for the time. It appears as a transparent glass box placed in front of a rigidly designed park, referencing the neighboring former military barracks Vester Allé Barracks. The conference center Scandinavian Center in postmodern style from 1995 by Friis & Moltke is one of the relatively few large structures produced in the Danish provincial cities in the 1990s and was at the time a monumental building.

In the 2000s, the city grew rapidly and many large structures has been built. The 63-metre-tall (207 ft) Prismet from 2001 by Friis & Moltke was the first building resembling modern glass-clad skyscrapers and the first building in 60 years to supersede the city hall in height. The later Aarhus City Tower from 2014, designed by Architema Architects, at 94 metres, was the first building in seven centuries to approach the height of the cathedral and is now visible across most of the city's skyline. In line with contemporary practises, the building incorporates features such as solar panel facades and a number of energy efficiency devices (central heating, LED lighting, proper insulation, etc.). The monumental ARoS Aarhus Art Museum from 2004 by Schmidt Hammer Lassen topped with a roof sculpture Rainbow Panorama by Ólafur Elíasson has become a feature of the Aarhus skyline. Development of the Docklands in the 2010s has produced a number of notable buildings such as the irregular Isbjerget (Iceberg) from 2013, the star-shaped Navitas from 2015 and the heptagonal neofuturistic Dokk1 cultural center from 2016.

== Districts and urban planning ==
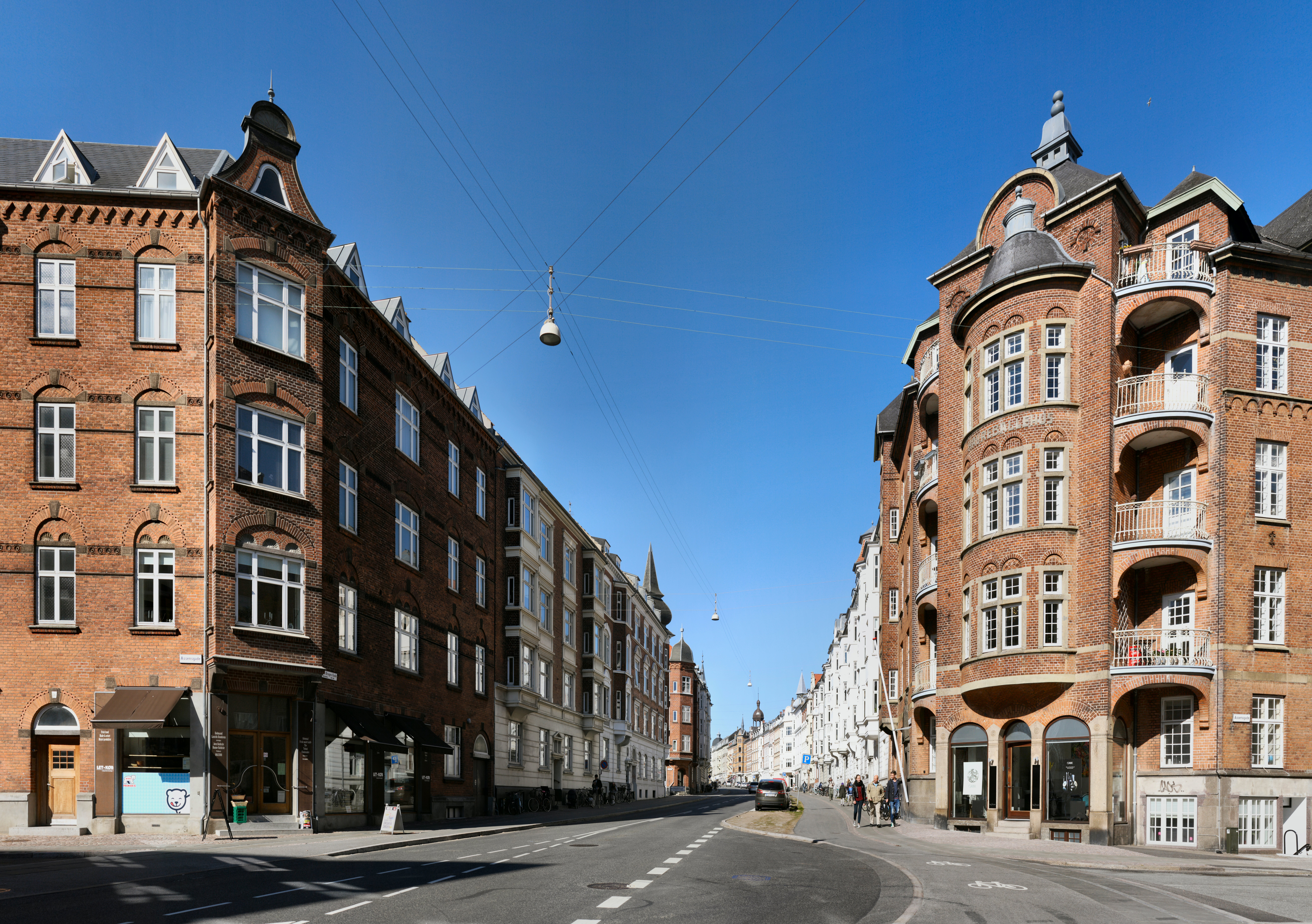
Hans Broges Gade, Frederiksberg

The oldest neighborhood is the Latin Quarter; a low, dense area with narrow, curved streets and buildings hailing back as far as the 1500s. The Latin Quarter and areas south of it delimits much of the city up to the 19th century. When the city walls were removed in 1851 the city expanded in all directions. Northwards into what became the Nørre Stenbro quarter, initially small-scale industry and small houses but in the late 1800s larger 4-5 story perimeter blocks with rental units. North-west became Vesterbro; at first villas but after 1870 many 2-3 story houses and by 1920 the first 4-5 story city blocks were built around Vesterbro Torv.

In the south Frederiksbjerg was developed between 1898 and 1930 by urban planning designs of the architect Hack Kampmann and city engineer Einar Ambt. The plans called for a tight city block structure around Ingerslevs Boulevard as the central axis. To the north Trøjborg was developed in stages, first industry and houses between 1896 and 1902 and later between 1928 and 1937 larger planned blocks. The area around the Central Station, Banegårdspladsen and Park Allé was developed in Neoclassical style in the 1920s by designs of Axel Høeg-Hansen.

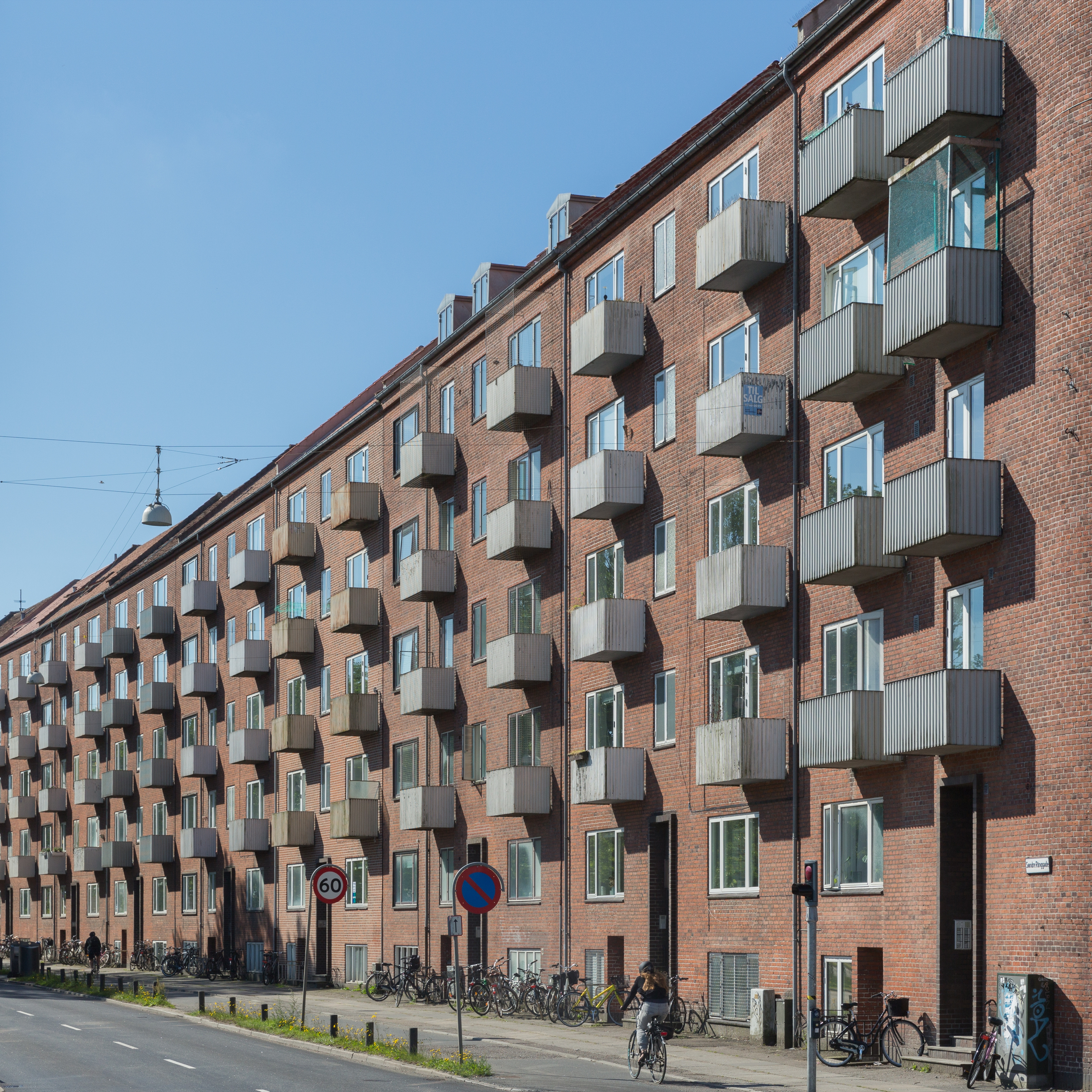
Typical housing project from the 1930s in Aarhus (Søndre Ringgade, finished in 1938)

In the 1930s, large public housing projects were initiated by strong housing cooperatives such as AAB in particular, and the building boomed in the post-war era. Some of more notable buildings from this period includes Bakkegaarden (1938), Viborggården (1940), and Møllevangen (1942-1953). From the 1950s, the increasing prosperity and wealth distribution inspired development and new construction of several garden suburbs such as Riisvangen and Viby J; suburbs that have later merged with the expanding city. From the 1960s, concrete construction took off with a number of notable high-rise projects including Klostervangen (finished 1968) and the large suburban Gellerup Plan (1968-1972).

The most recent neighborhoods includes CeresByen and the Docklands, developed in the 2010s on former industrial sites. The architecture is contemporary, with several new architectural icons, and are generally taller with many free-standing buildings in contrast to the enclosed city blocks typical for the rest of the city. As of 2025, new boroughs are still under construction, also in the city center, including Sydhavnskvarteret in the south harbour district and Brokvarteret, while some are still in the planning phase, such as the redevelopment of the central bus terminals and railway yard.

== Industrial architecture ==
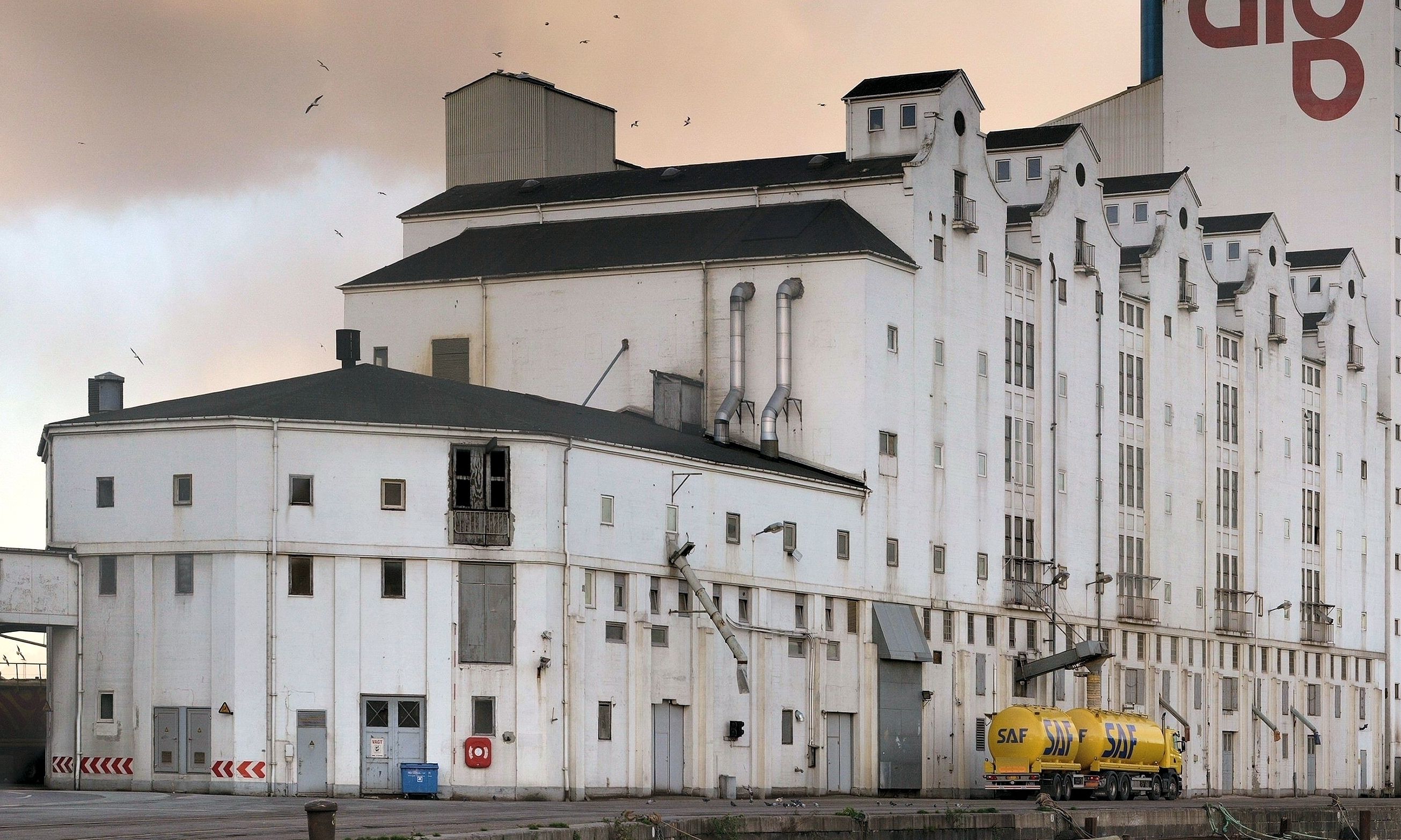
The Five Sisters was the first concrete structure

Aarhus' past as a 20th-century industrial center is evident in several large industrial properties and structures in and around the city center but there's also many buildings that testify to the earliest small factories of the 18th and 19th centuries. During early industrialization factories were often placed in former merchant's houses where there was ample space, such as the Aarhus Art Academy building which housed one of the many tobacco factories of the late 19th century. Mønsted's House was built in 1810 for several small factories but was later bought by Otto Mønsted who established the Aarhus Butterine Company there in the 1890s. Factories gradually grew larger and eventually purpose-built factories were designed such as Elvirasminde from 1912.

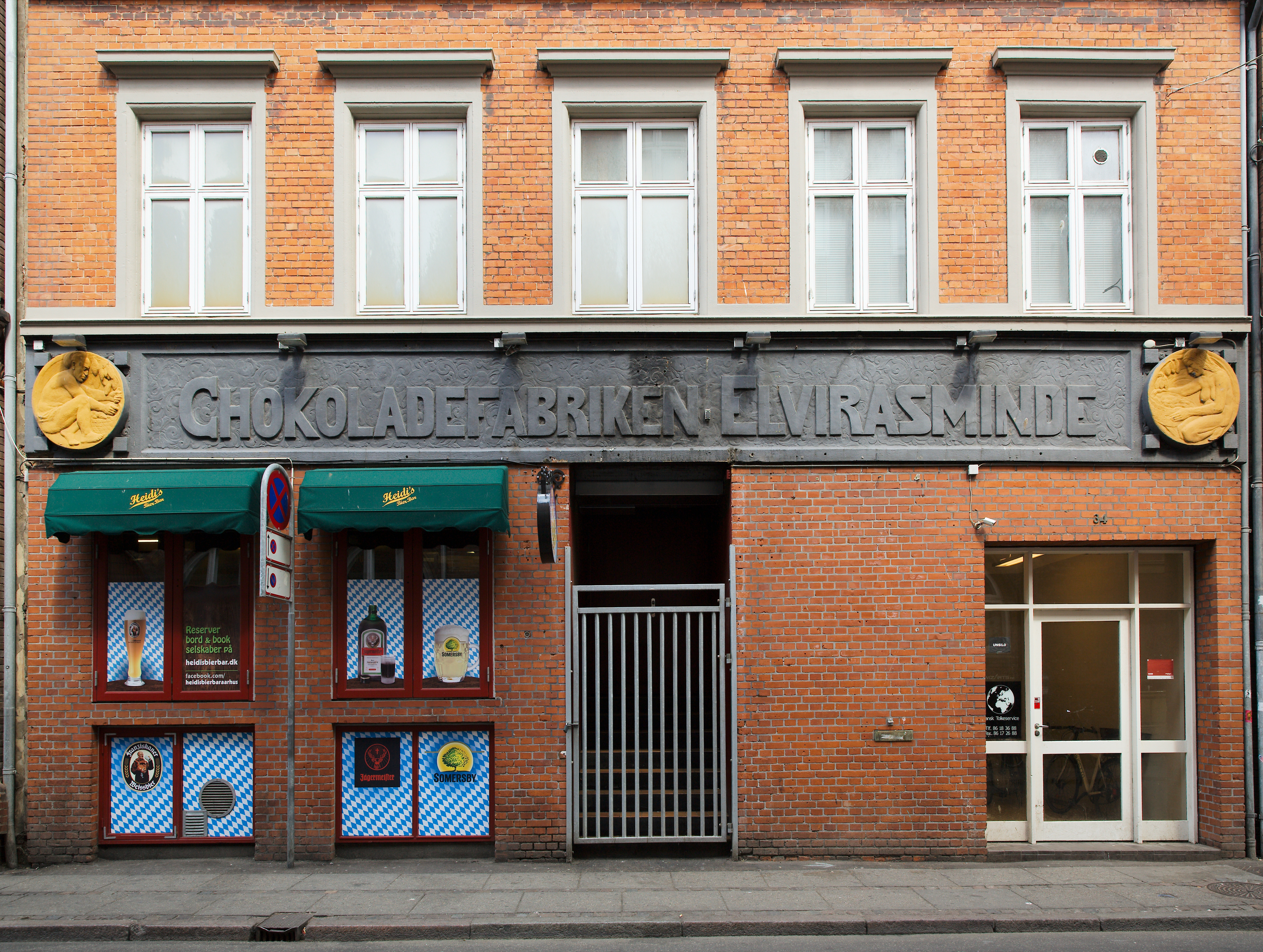
Several former industry buildings in the city center has been repurposed. Here an old chocolate factory (Elvirasminde) that closed in 1979 is now home to nightclubs, eateries, and a cultural center.

The largest industrial factories has left the center of Aarhus for the suburbs but their legacy remain in the form of several large complexes of buildings. The largest active site is the Port of Aarhus which was moved to new facilities in the 2010s while the old port areas are being redeveloped into a new neighborhood. The most prominent buildings of the 19th century port area are the Five Sisters, one of 25 Danish Industrial Heritage Sites, and the listed warehouse Stykgodspakhuset. The area of the former Ceres Brewery is being developed into a new, modern neighborhood in the 2010s after it closed in 2008 and the factory and ironworks complex for Frichs, was converted to a commercial business district in the early 2000s. Common for both sites is the preservation of some buildings or details such as rail track to connect the old with the new. The oldest and best preserved site is the Aarhus Central Workshops which comprise numerous buildings from the early 20th century train repair facilities, today a cultural and commercial center.

== Tall buildings ==
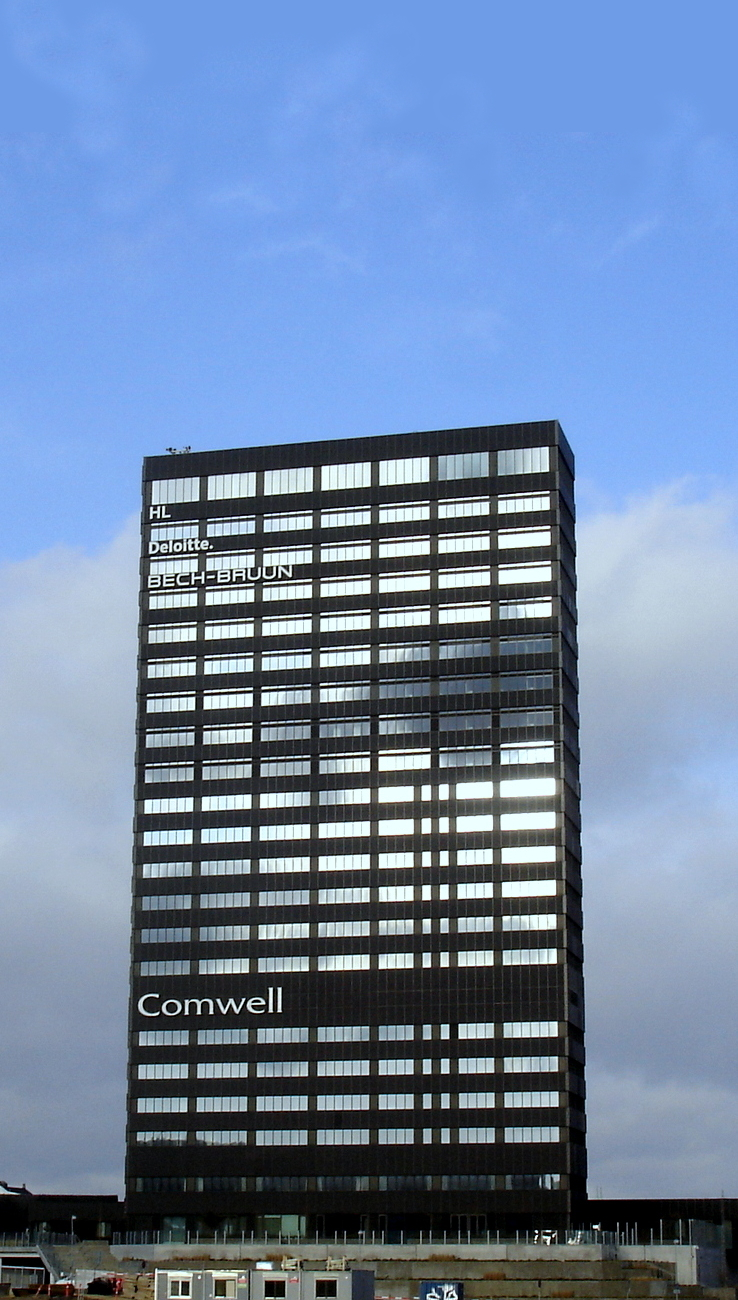
Aarhus City Tower in Midtbyen

Since its construction, Aarhus Cathedral has been the tallest building structure in Aarhus and it still is. For many years, since its construction in 1941, the second tallest building in the city has been the City Hall Tower at 60 metres, and it was official policy that no other construction should rise above it on the Aarhus skyline. In 2001, the glass facaded office building of Prismet (The Prism) stood finished at 63 metres, but the City Hall is built on a hill and it still appeared as the highest structure on the skyline. In 2004, the office and residential building of EY-huset was finished at 68.5 metres. The last four stories of EY-huset were illegal, against the local law on building heights and it was the first building in the city that rose above the Aarhus City Hall Tower on the skyline.

In 2001, Aarhus Municipality presented an official policy on highrises in Aarhus, in order to:

"secure that tall buildings in certain areas are a possibility, that the interest for high buildings in Aarhus materializes in projects that are well-argumented in terms of planning and in a broad sense are able to add something positive to the city."

Several new tall buildings and highrises are planned or in the construction phase in Aarhus. The building heights has in some cases become an issue for the citizens of the city and they have opposed projects in the City Council.

Existing buildings over 50 meters in height
Structure	Height	Built	Type	Architect
Aarhus Cathedral	96 m	1300	Church	
Aarhus City Tower	94 m	2015	Hotel	Arkitema Architects
Ceres Panorama	75 m	2016	Residential	schmidt hammer lassen
EY Huset	68.5 m	2004	Offices	schmidt hammer lassen
Prismet	63 m	2001	Offices	Friis & Moltke
Aarhus City Hall	60 m	1941	City Hall	Arne Jacobsen, Erik Møller
Systematic	58 m	2021	Offices	Erik Arkitekter
Højhuset Langenæs	55 m	1971	Residential	Salling-Mortensen
Catholic Church of Our Lady	53 m	1880	Church	Frantz Schmitz
Klostervangen	51.5m	1970	Residential	Richter & Gravers
Grøfthøjparken	51m	1970	Residential	Friis & Moltke
ARoS	50.5 m	2004	Museum	schmidt hammer lassen
St. John's Church	50 m	1905	Church	Hack Kampmann

Under construction
Structure	Height	Built	Type	Architect
Frederiks Plads Tower F	81 m	2017	Residential	C. F. Møller Architects
AARhus (East Tower)	74 m	2018	Residential	Bjarke Ingels Group
Frederiks Plads Tower E	62,5 m	2017	Residential	C. F. Møller Architects
AARhus (West Tower)	52,5 m	2018	Residential	Bjarke Ingels Group
Nærheden	51 m	2017	Residential	Olav de Linde
Pakhusene (Tower 1)	50 m	2017	Mixed use	AART architects

Planned
Structure	Height	Built	Type	Architect
La Tour	95 m	2017	Residential	3XN
Lighthouse	110 m	2019	Residential	A. Enggaard
C	65 m	2018	Residential	schmidt hammer lassen

== Architects ==
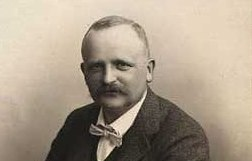
Hack Kampmann had a large impact on Aarhus

The architect who have had the largest impact on Aarhus is arguably Hack Kampmann (1856–1920). Kampmann worked in the Art Nouveau National Romantic style and designed a number of important buildings in Aarhus at the turn of the 20th century. The Custom House from 1897, the Theatre from 1900 and Marselisborg Palace from 1902 are some of the finest National Romantic works and are symptomatic for the development of the city at the time. C. F. Møller (1898–1988) also had a large impact and is responsible for some of the largest public institutions in the city, the University from 1933 and the Municipal Hospital from 1935, both designed in the Functionalist style. Situated on opposite sides of the same street the university and hospital complexes complement each other with similar styles but their own individual expressions. C.F. Møller later designed the State and University Library extension for the university and the "Grey" building of the Cathedral School. Other important figures include Sophus Frederik Kühnel (1851–1930) who worked in Revivalism and designed Mejlborg, Vilhelm Theodor Walther (1819–1892) who designed several churches in Romanesque revival, Hjalmar Kjær (1803–1863) who built the Five Sisters and Ludvig Petersen (1848–1935) who designed many of the schools in Aarhus.

Today Aarhus is home to a number of architect companies many of which work internationally. The best known may be schmidt hammer lassen architects, C. F. Møller Architects and Arkitema Architects. C. F. Møller Architects is still the primary architect for many of the university expansion projects and is responsible for 70% of the Aarhus University campus. Other important architect companies based in Aarhus are Kjær & Richter, CEBRA, Cubo Architects, Friis & Moltke, aarhus arkitekterne and Møller & Grønborg. The landscape architect company Schønherr has worked on several projects in Aarhus transforming urban landscapes into green spaces and in 2015 it won the contest to transform Bispetorv from a parking lot to an open square with trees and recreational areas.

== Organizations ==
The citizen organization of "Foreningen for Bykultur i Aarhus" (Association for City-culture in Aarhus) was established in 1967 by then mayor Steffen Bernhardt Jensen in order to create understanding for, and guard, the aesthetic and cultural historic values of the city. The organization is not attached to any political party and is a meeting spot for the citizens of Aarhus to discuss and share their interest in the city's history, architecture and physical planning. It is an independent local department of the nationwide "Landsforeningen for Bygnings- og Landskabskultur" (National Association for Building- and Landscape-culture).

Bernhardt Jensen was instrumental in securing and preserving central and historic parts of central Aarhus, including the Latin Quarter.

== See also ==
- Architecture of Denmark
- Listed buildings in Aarhus Municipality
- List of Churches in Aarhus
- Aarhus Courthouse
