= Prismet =

Coordinates: 56°09′27.2″N 10°11′34.3″E

The Prism
- Prismet
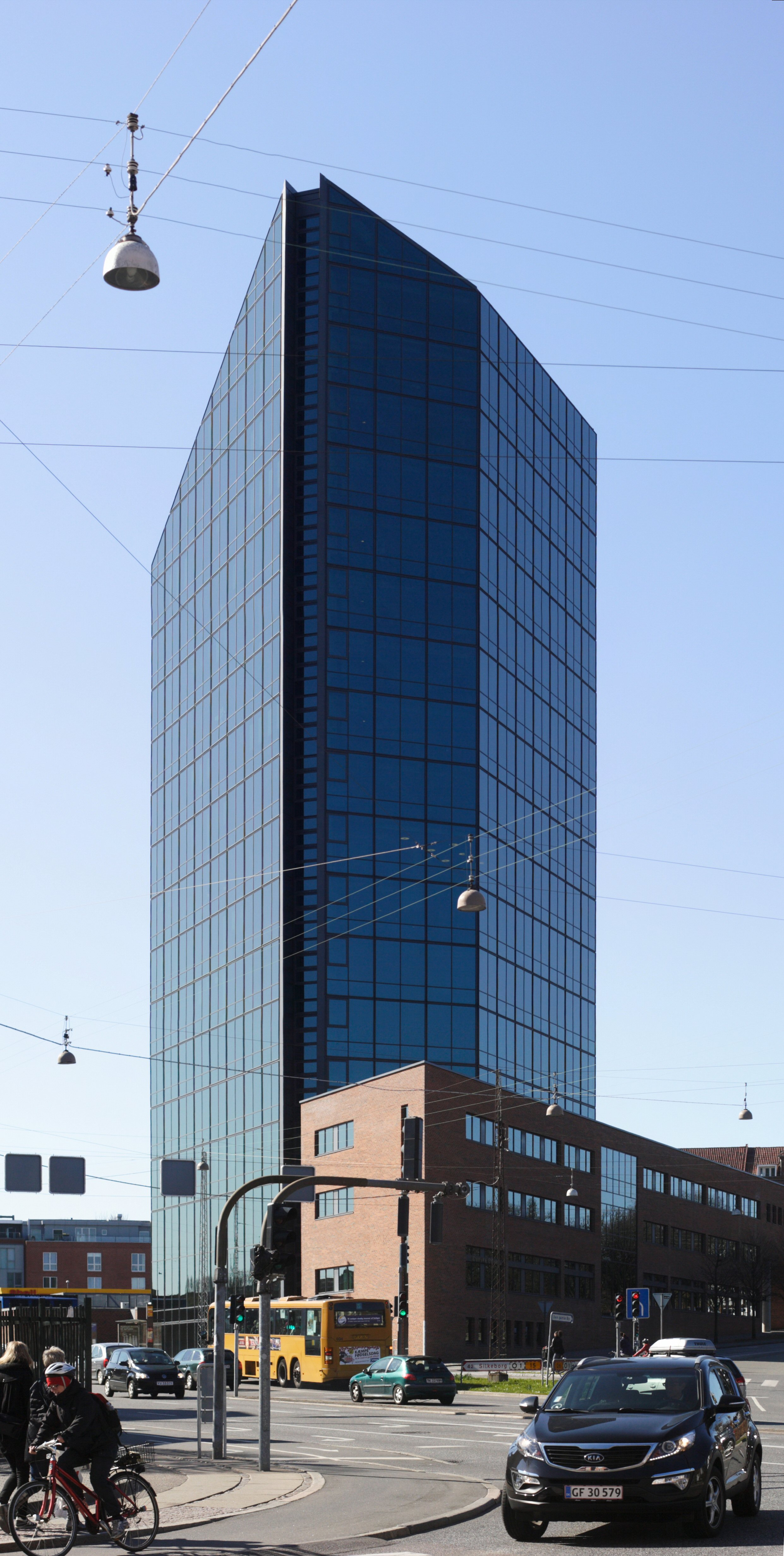
- Prismet
- Interactive map of the The Prism area

General information
- Location: Aarhus, Denmark
- Completed: 2001

Height
- Height: 63 meters

Design and construction
- Architect: Friis & Moltke
- Engineer: Birch & Krogboe A/S

Prismet (English: The Prism) is an office building in Aarhus, Denmark. It is one of the tallest buildings in the city and it was the first building more than 50 meters tall built in Aarhus city center since the early 1970s. Prismet was built by the Danish investment group PFA Byg A/S between 1999 and 2002. The contractor was H. Hoffmann & Sønner A/S, the engineer Birch & Krogboe A/S and the architect company Friis & Moltke. The landscape architect firm Schønherr designed the outdoors areas, including a small park. The project covers 17800 m2.

== Controversy ==
Prismet is known for its location in proximity to the Old Town Museum from which the building is clearly visible and offers a strong contrast to the old, half-timbered buildings in the museum. Prismet has been criticized for ruining the illusion of being in a medieval town.

== Gallery ==
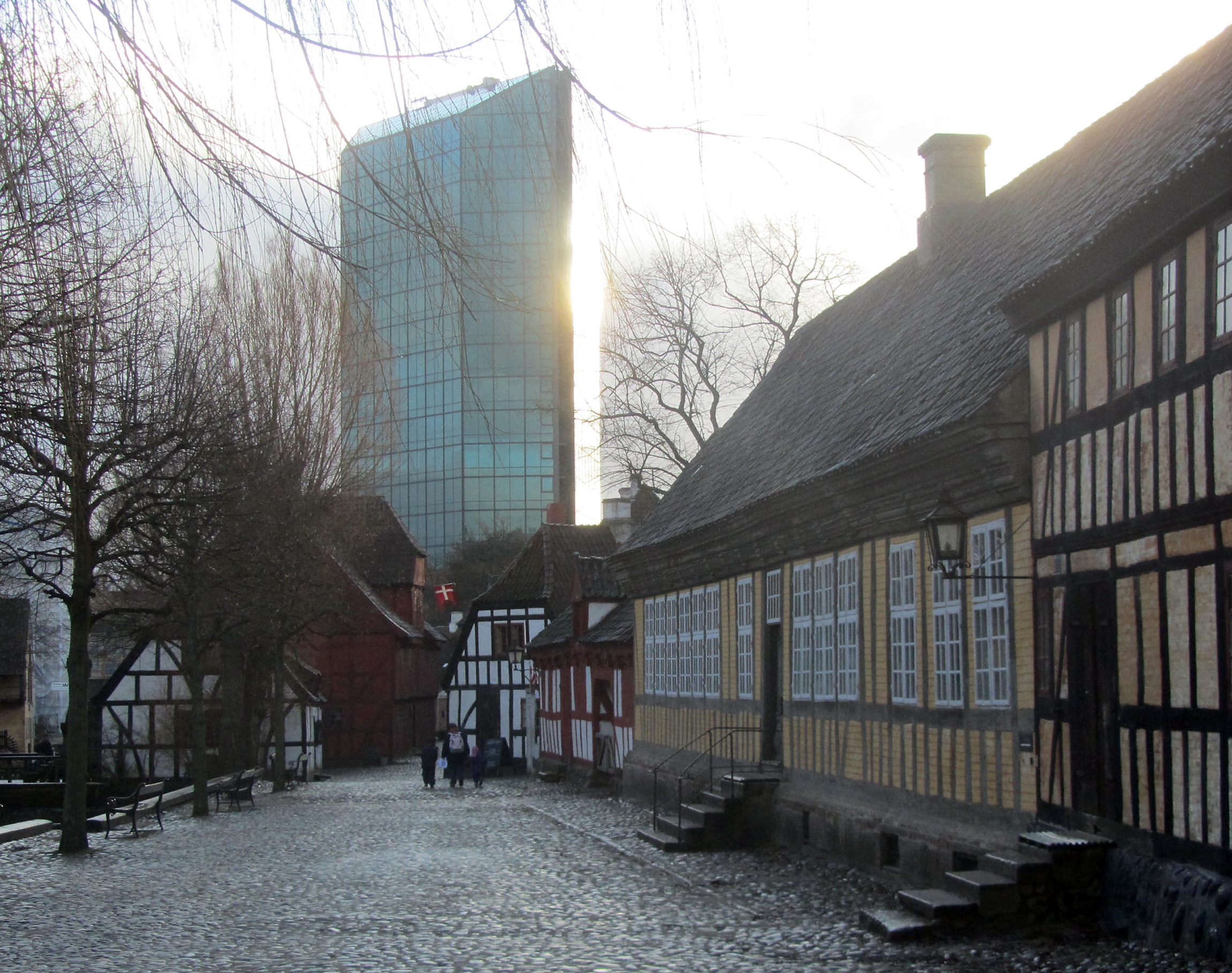
Prismet seen from the Old Town Museum

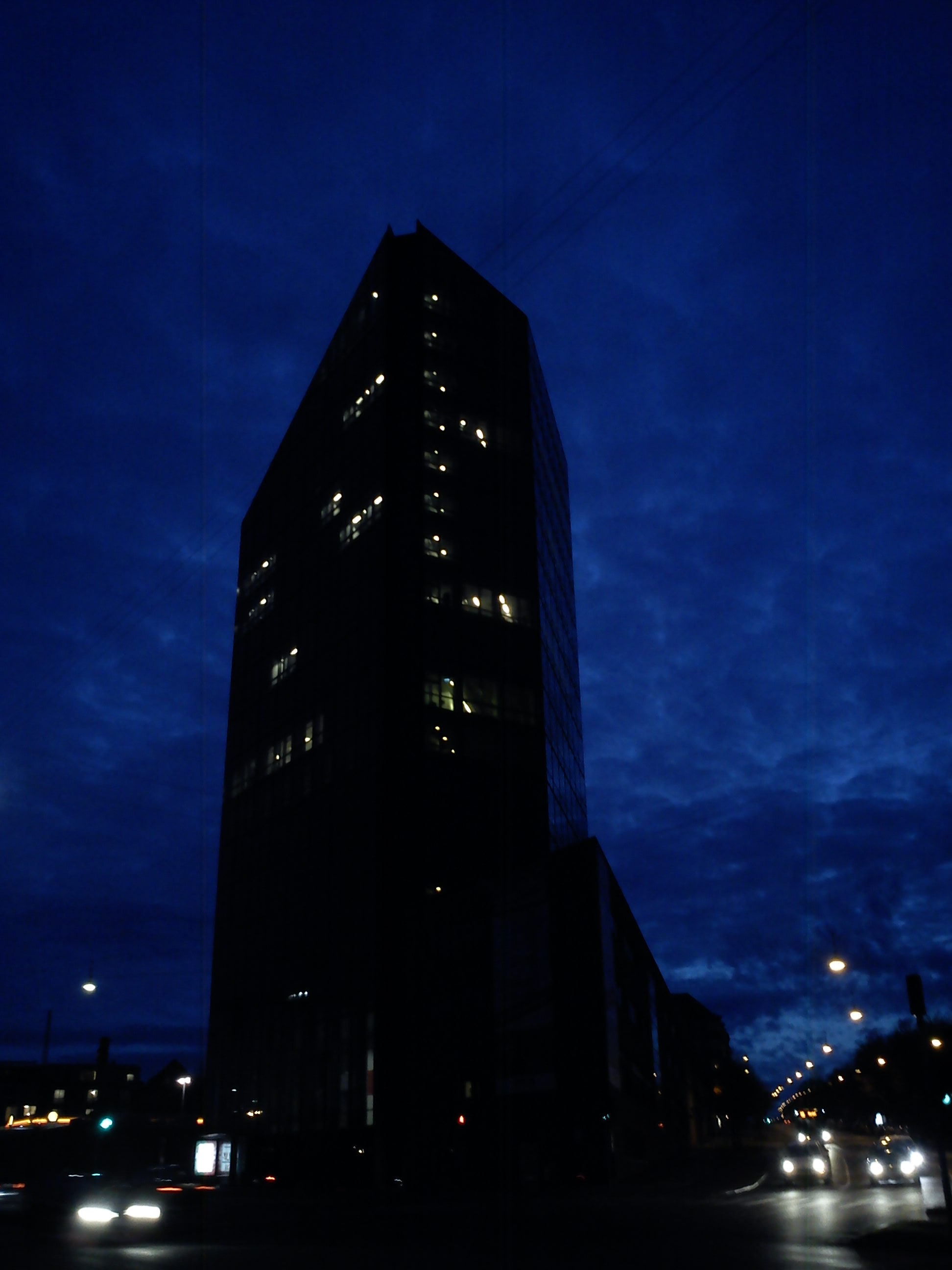
Prismet is a noticeable landmark both day and night

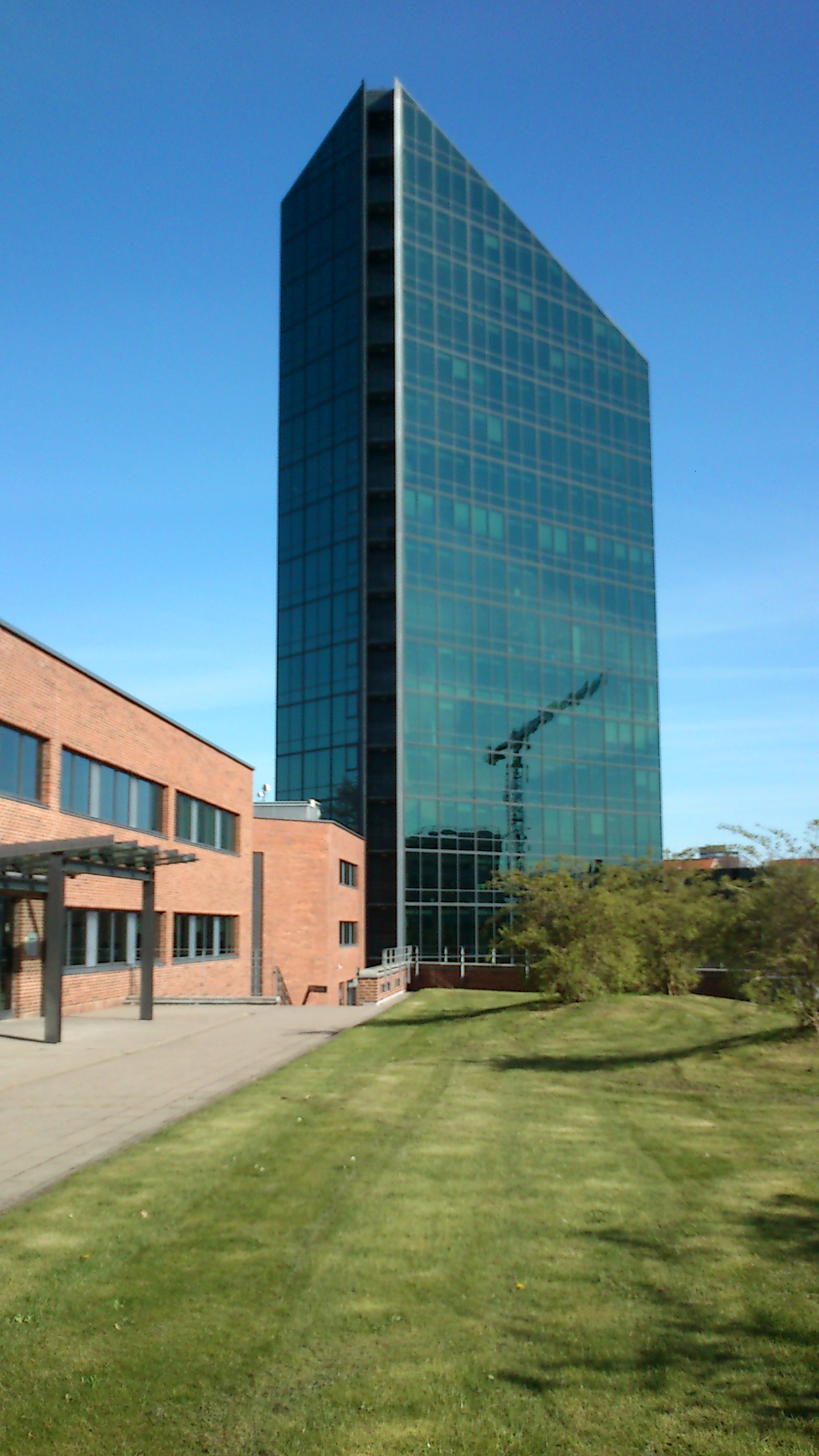
View from the garden

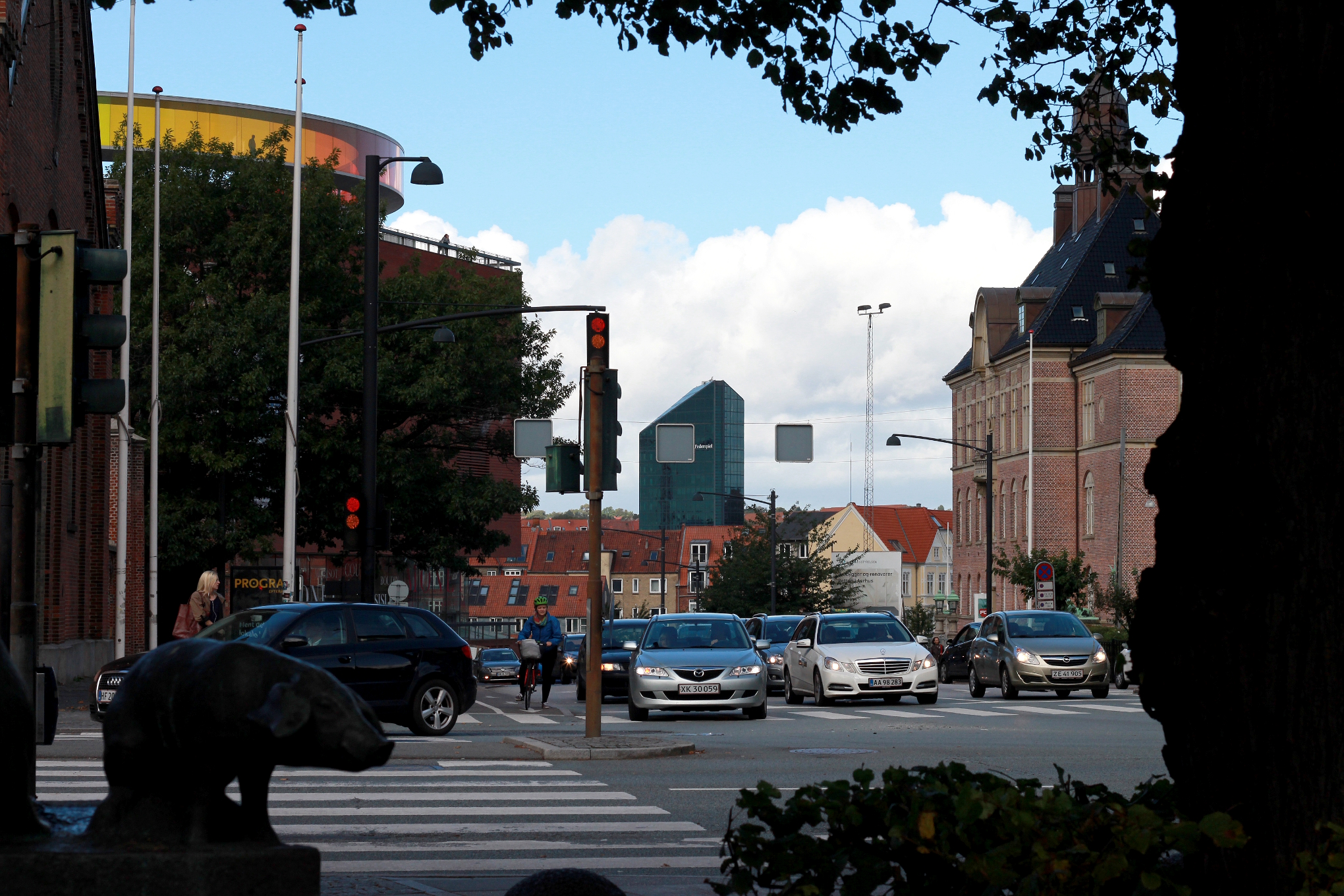
View from Rådhuspladsen (City Hall Square)

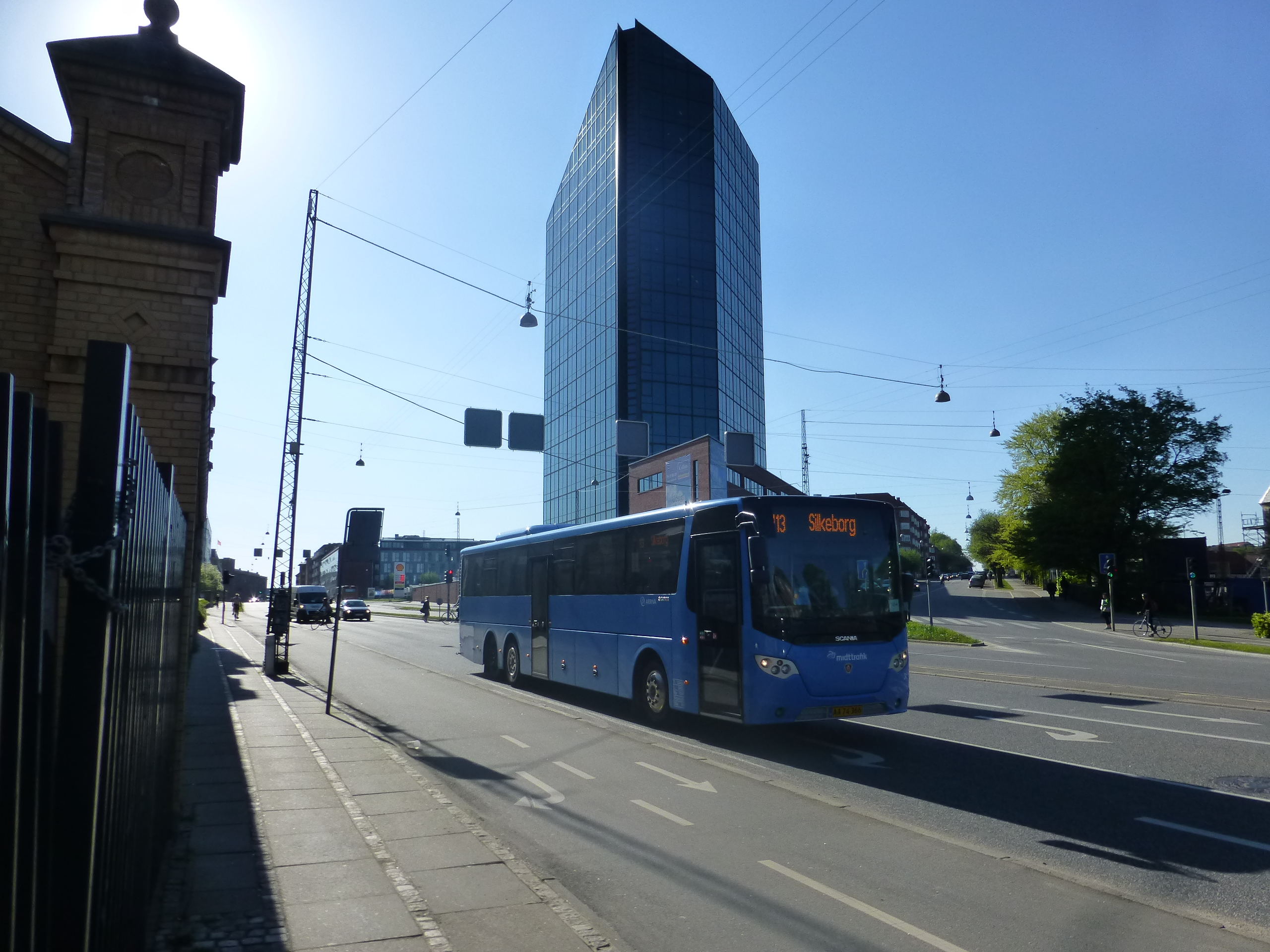
View from Ceres-krydset

== See also ==
- Architecture of Aarhus
