= Aarhus Female Seminary =

Coordinates: 56°10′15.1″N 10°12′28.2″E

- Aarhus Kvindeseminarium
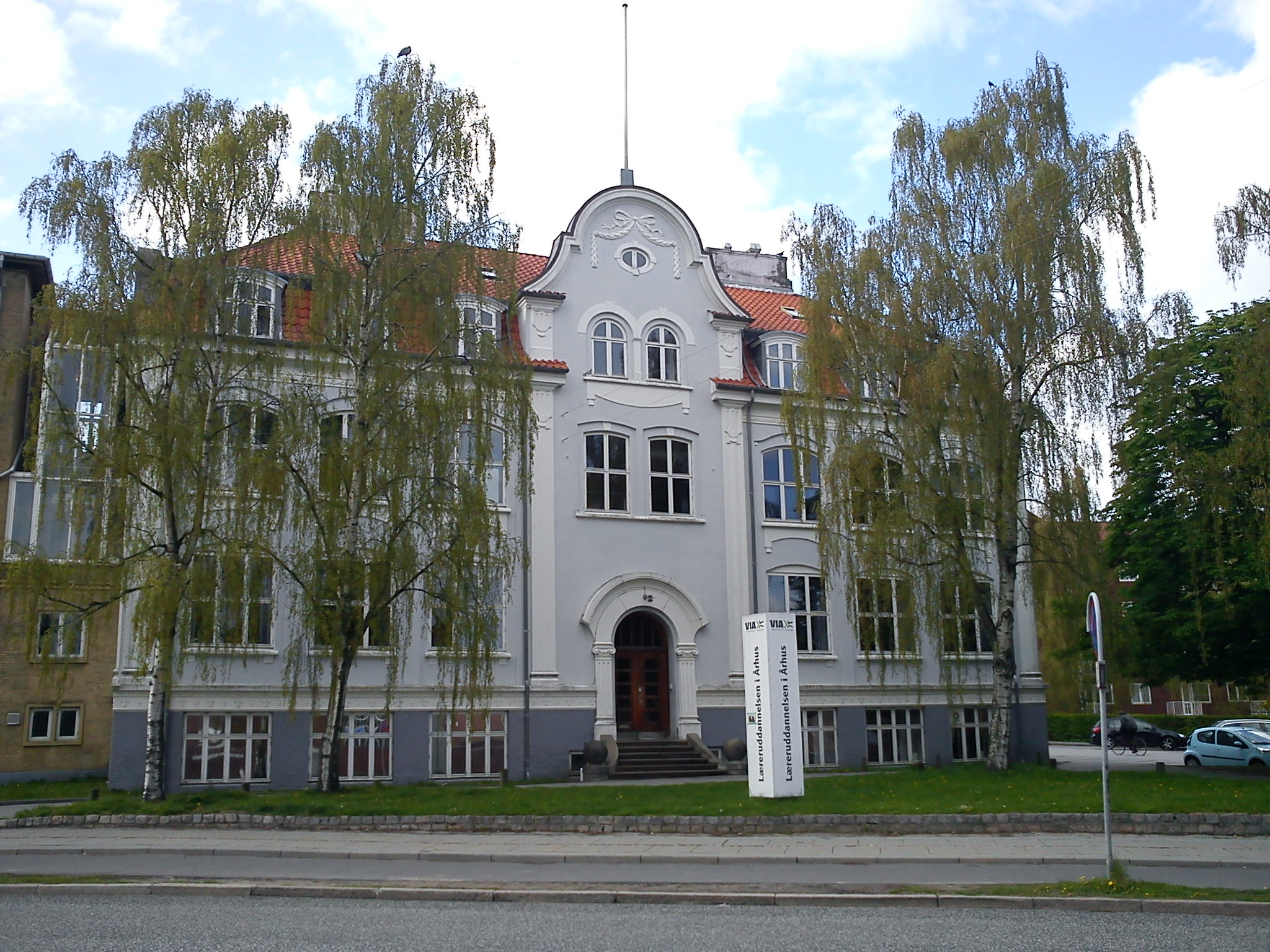
- Aarhus Female Seminary
- Interactive map of the Aarhus Female Seminary area

General information
- Location: Trøjborg, Aarhus, Denmark
- Completed: 1910
- Client: Indre Mission

Aarhus Female Seminary (Danish: Aarhus Kvindeseminarium) is a building and a former women's teachers' seminary in Aarhus, Denmark situated on Trøjborgvej 82. The building was constructed for the religious Christian organization Indre Mission in 1910 to house a teachers' seminary for women. The building has housed educational institutions since it was built although Indre Mission no longer owns the building. The name of the school has changed over the years as it has transitioned through different operators but VIA University College may be the last as the college will eventually relocate to CeresByen. The building was designed by the architect Frits Jensen who gave it a French palace-expression.

== Background ==
In the early 1900s there was a construction boom in the neighborhood of Trøjborg and the religious organization Indre Mission joined in when it was decided to construct a seminary in Aarhus. Similar to the construction of St. John's Church in 1905 it was to be funded by private means. Indre Mission started collecting contributions from their members to establish the seminary along with homes for about 3 students. In 1909 it was decided the economic conditions were favorable enough to start construction. Ground had not yet been broken when Indre Mission rented rooms in a villa and started teaching two classes while the teacher and rector lived on the first floor. The seminary was placed next to the Finsensgade School so teacher students could use the elementary school to practice and learn.

The seminary was completed in 1910 and was inaugurated on 30 November.

== Seminary ==
The student body was generally diverse but the teachers and rectors were selected and approved by Indre Mission. The initial school in 1910 was known as the Aarhus Female Seminary but in 1931 it became co-ed and was renamed to the Aarhus Seminary (Danish: Aarhus Seminarium). In 1989 Aarhus Seminary merged with Marselisborg Seminary and was renamed to Aarhus Common-Seminary (Danish: Århus Fællesseminarium) and in 1995 the school was renamed again to Aarhus Day- and Evening Seminary (Danish: Århus Dag- og Aftenseminarium). In 2008 VIA University College was created and took over the school, renaming it VIA Læreruddannelsen. In 2016, the school left the building and moved to the new CeresByen neighborhood. Over time some 5000 people have graduated as teachers from the school.

== Architecture ==
The building was designed by architect Frits Jensen. The period is notable for an architectural style which emulated French palace architecture with light, plastered facades, often with bay windows and a facade divided with pilasters and lesenes and decorated with festons, floral vines or reefs. The Aarhus Female Seminary is an imposing example of trend and one of only a few in the neighborhood. In 1932 it had become necessary to expand the school since new laws had made higher-education gendered schools illegal. The new building was situated next to the original building and was designed with a rational Functionalist expression.

== See also ==
- Architecture of Aarhus
