= EY Huset =

Coordinates: 56°08′58.0″N 10°12′21.6″E

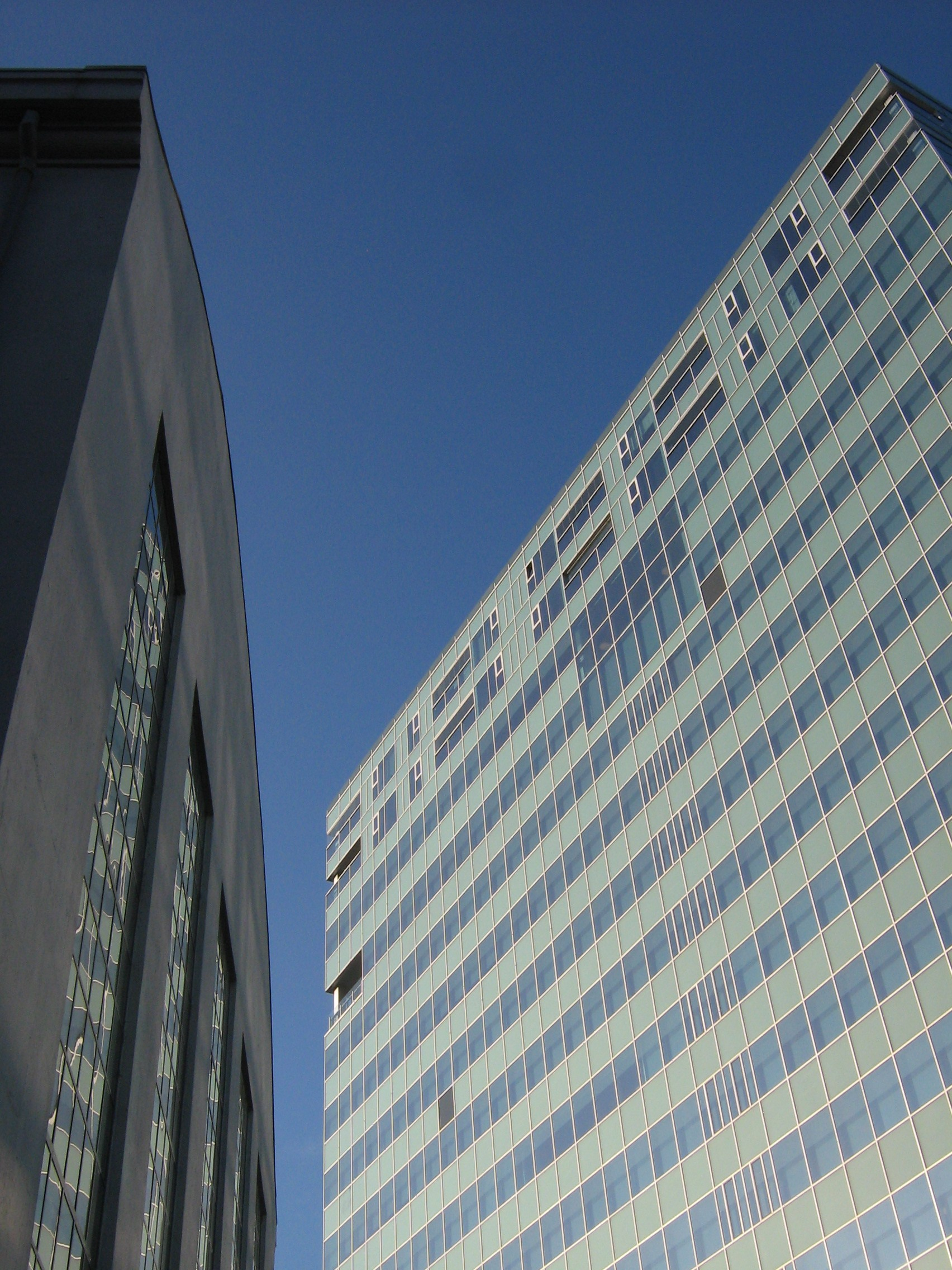
- EY Huset

General information
- Town or city: Aarhus
- Country: Denmark
- Completed: 2004
- Height: 63.5 meters

Design and construction
- Architect(s): Schmidt Hammer Lassen, 3XN
- Engineer: NCC Construction Danmark A/S

EY Huset (formerly KPMG-huset) is a building on Værkmestergade 25 in the Indre By neighborhood in Aarhus, Denmark. It is one of the tallest buildings in Aarhus and Denmark at large. At 68.5 meters it is the fourth tallest building in Aarhus after Aarhus Cathedral, Aarhus City Tower and Ceres Panorama. As of 2017 it is the 16th tallest building in Denmark. EY Huset is a mixed use building with condominiums on the top two floors, offices on the following 10, stores on the next 2 while the bottom 3 are various miscellaneous. The high-rise was built as a part of the commercial department store project Bruun's Galleri. The building is 17 floors tall and is situated directly behind Aarhus Central Station surrounded by buildings that are generally lower.

The building was formerly known as KPMG Huset after KPMG who rented a number of floors in the building. After Ernst & Young took over KPMG activities in Denmark the building was renamed to EY Huset.

== Architecture ==
EY Huset was designed in collaboration between the architect firms Schmidt Hammer Lassen and 3XN. NCC Construction Danmark A/S functioned as the project leader during construction. The glass in the facade was mounted and tested over two rounds before a choice was made. The glass chosen has been lightly corroded by acid to stop reflections in the nearby areas and the glass has partial silk imprints to limit light from getting into the building heating it.

== See also ==
- Architecture of Aarhus
- List of tallest buildings in Denmark
