= Højhuset Langenæs =

High-rise building in Aarhus, Denmark

Coordinates: 56°08′33.1″N 10°11′08.5″E

- Højhuset Langenæs
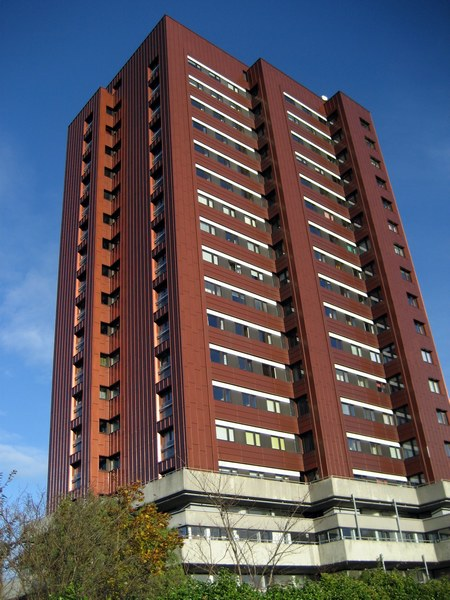
- Højhuset Langenæs
- Interactive map of the Højhuset Langenæs area

General information
- Location: Aarhus, Denmark
- Construction started: 1967
- Completed: 1971

Height
- Height: 55 meters

Design and construction
- Architect: Salling-Mortensen

Højhuset Langenæs (Lit.: High-rise Langenæs) is a building on Langenæs Alle in the Langenæs neighborhood in Aarhus, Denmark. It is one of only two high-rise buildings in Denmark constructed from brick. It was one of the first high-rises in Aarhus and it is one of the tallest buildings in both Aarhus and Denmark; in 2017 it was the 7th tallest building in Aarhus and the 30th tallest building in Denmark. Højhuset Langenæs is a residential building owned and originally constructed by the housing organization Arbejdernes Andels Boligforening and it is composed of rental apartment units.

== Architecture ==
Højhuset Langenæs is stories and 55 meters tall and the upper 15 floors are split between 90 apartments. The building was commissioned by Arbejdernes Andels Boligforening and constructed between 1967 and 1971 by drawings supplied by the architect's practice Salling-Mortensen and the advisory engineering firm Askøes Eftf.. The building is constructed of red brick using the experiences gained when the other brick high-rise in Aarhus, Højhus Charlottehøj, was constructed by the same architects and engineers. Højhus Charlottehøj and Højhuset Langenæs are the only high-rises in Denmark constructed from brick.

In 1991-92 Højhuset Langenæs was renovated and had a protective outer shell installed, made of red-painted aluminum sheets.

== See also ==
- Architecture of Aarhus
- List of tallest buildings in Denmark
