= Møllestien =

Street in Aarhus, Denmark

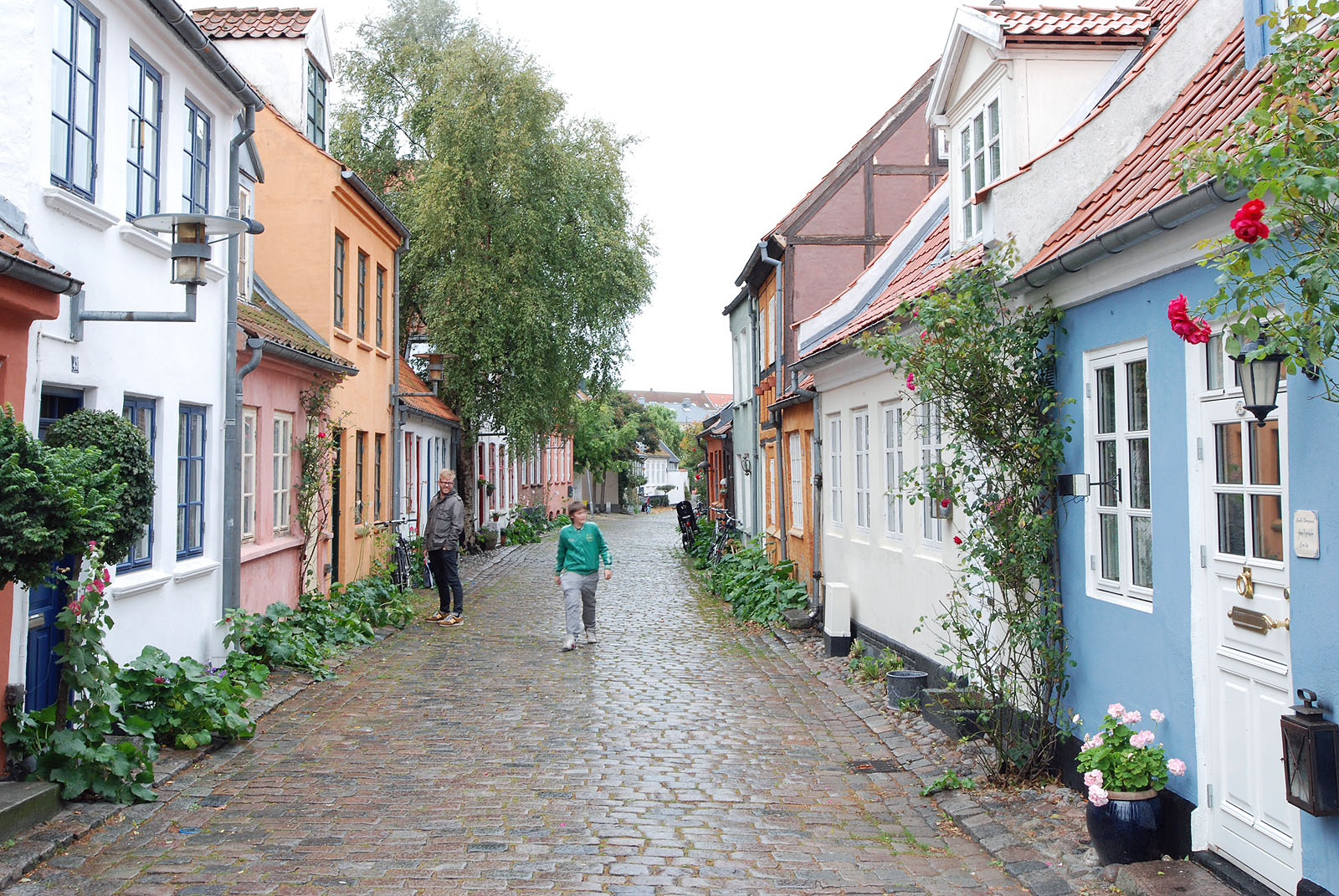
- Møllestien in Aarhus
- Length: 240 m (790 ft)
- Location: Indre By, Aarhus, Denmark
- Postal code: 8000
- Coordinates: 56°09′23.6″N 10°12′04.3″E

Møllestien (Lit.: Mill Path) is a street in Aarhus, Denmark which runs west to east from Vester Allé to Grønnegade and intersects Møllegade roughly in the middle. The street is situated in the historic Indre By neighborhood and is known for its small houses and cobblestone pavement. The street has existed since before 1300 and the name has been used since the 15th century. The majority of the buildings in the street were constructed between 1870 and 1885.

Møllestien has a unique picturesque architecture that has made it a landmark and tourist attraction.

== History ==
Møllestien was most likely created in connection with an expansion of the road network in the 1200s, but it possibly dates back as far as the Viking Age. The name refers to Aarhus Mill and is from sometime before 1600; the mill is mentioned for the first time in 1289 and was situated where the former Aarhus Main Library is located on Møllestien 1 in Mølleparken in the western end of the street. The street has previously been split in three parts – Møllestien, Vestre Møllesti (Western Møllesti) and Østre Møllesti (Eastern Møllesti). The street stretched from Møllegade to the area where Lokalcenter Møllestien is today (2017). At that point it curved at a 90-degree angle and merged into Vestergade. The former path of the street is today marked by a narrow walking path that extends around Lokalcenter Møllestien. Østre Møllesti was the section of the street east of Grønnegade while Møllestien was the section west of it. The section between Møllestien and Vestergade which is today Grønnegade was previously Vestre Møllesti. Originally there were no direct path from Møllestien to Aarhus river and as a result there was little traffic in the area. Not until Christians Bridge was created in 1910 was Møllestien extended to the river and the street became more lively.

The soil between Møllestien and the river made the backyards of the houses in the street ideally suited for growing vegetables and the street has occasionally been called "Aarhus' Amager" as a result. However, the closer to the 20th century the poorer the inhabitants in the street became. The tenants generally could not afford to maintain the buildings or have them improved with new technologies such as modern sanitation and electricity. During the 1920s Aarhus suffered a lack of housing and the small, increasingly decrepit houses became home to impoverished families. In 1925 the conditions had deteriorated so much that several of the houses remained unused despite the general lack of housing throughout the city and a committee was established by the city council to look at ways to improve living conditions. The recommendations were not followed however, and the houses in the street were left to deteriorate for another 50 years.

In June 1960 the city council enacted a renovation plan for Møllestien east of Grønnegade and south of Vestergade which entailed demolishing most of it. Several years passed before the plans could be effectuated and in the meantime the western section of the street became inhabited by young students and artists who renovated the old houses, painted them in colorful colors and planted roses in front of most of the houses. The renovation plan for the remaining section was carried out through the 1960s and the old buildings from the turn of the 20th century were replaced with larger, modern structures. Among the people that moved in were the actors Vigga Bro and Fritz Bruun in 1959 and in 1963 the young couple Bettina Heltberg and Svend Auken.

The part of Møllestien that remains is largely left untouched since the 1870s and is one of the places left in Aarhus that showcases 19th-century working class housing in the city.

== Gallery ==
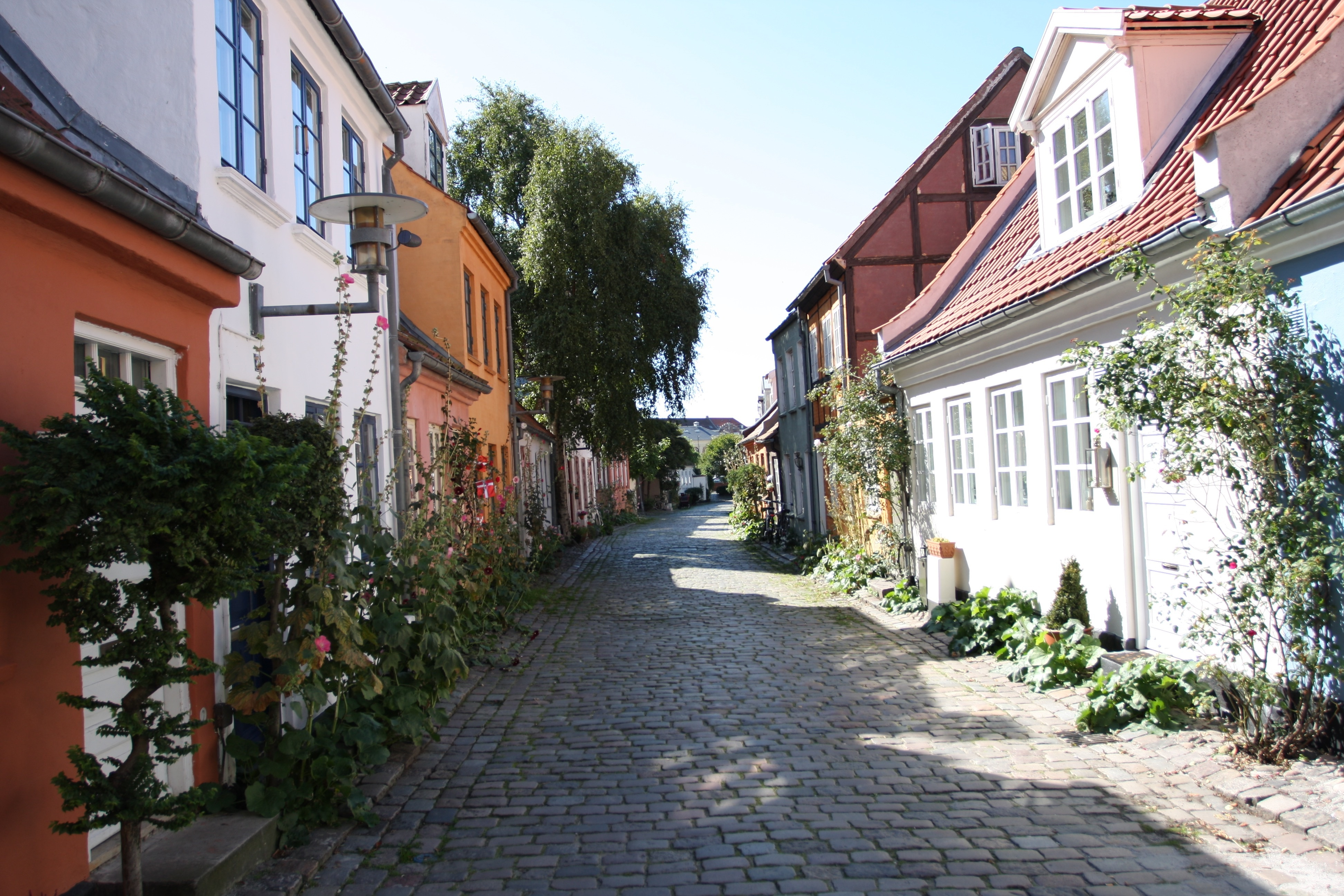

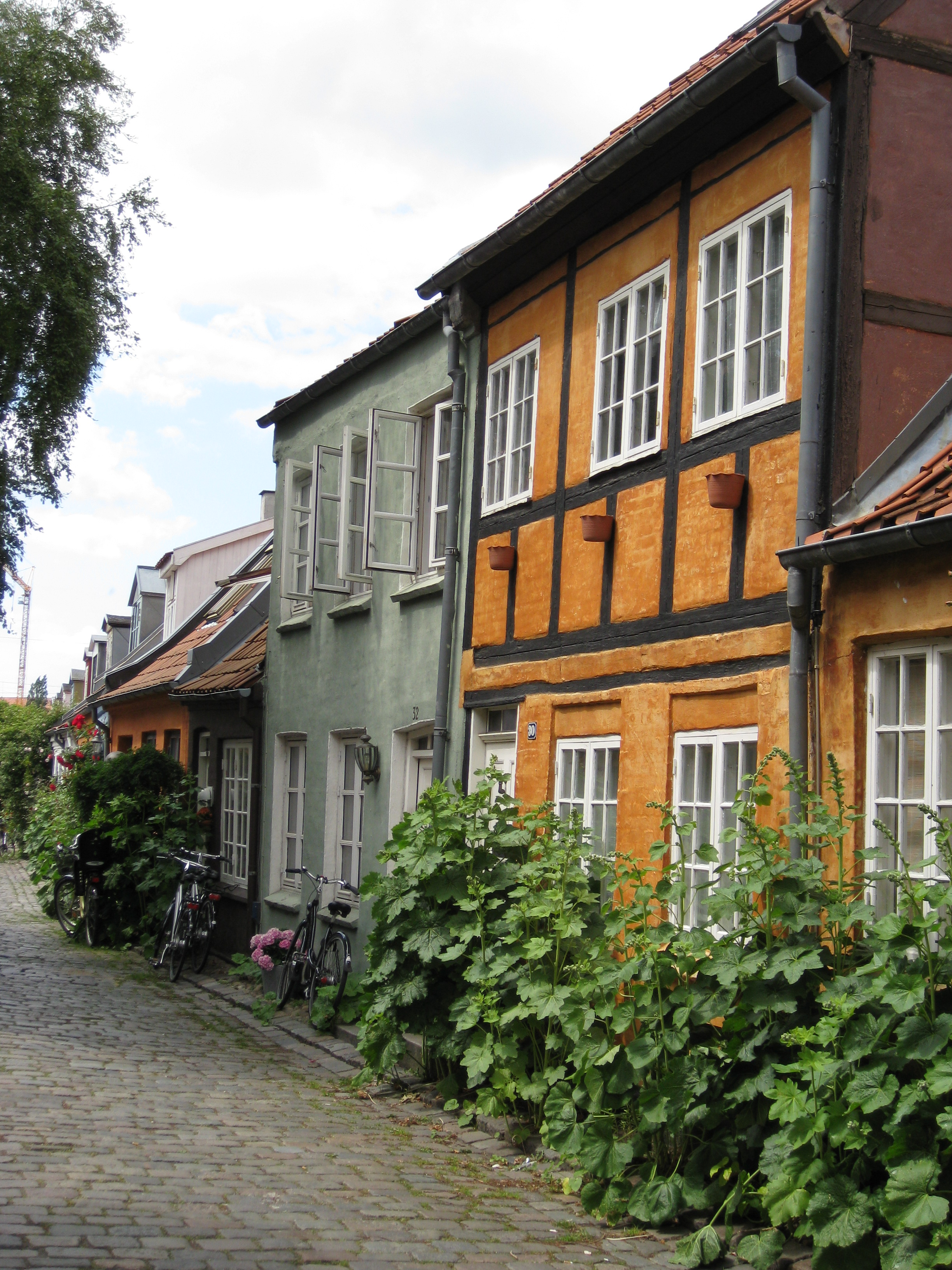

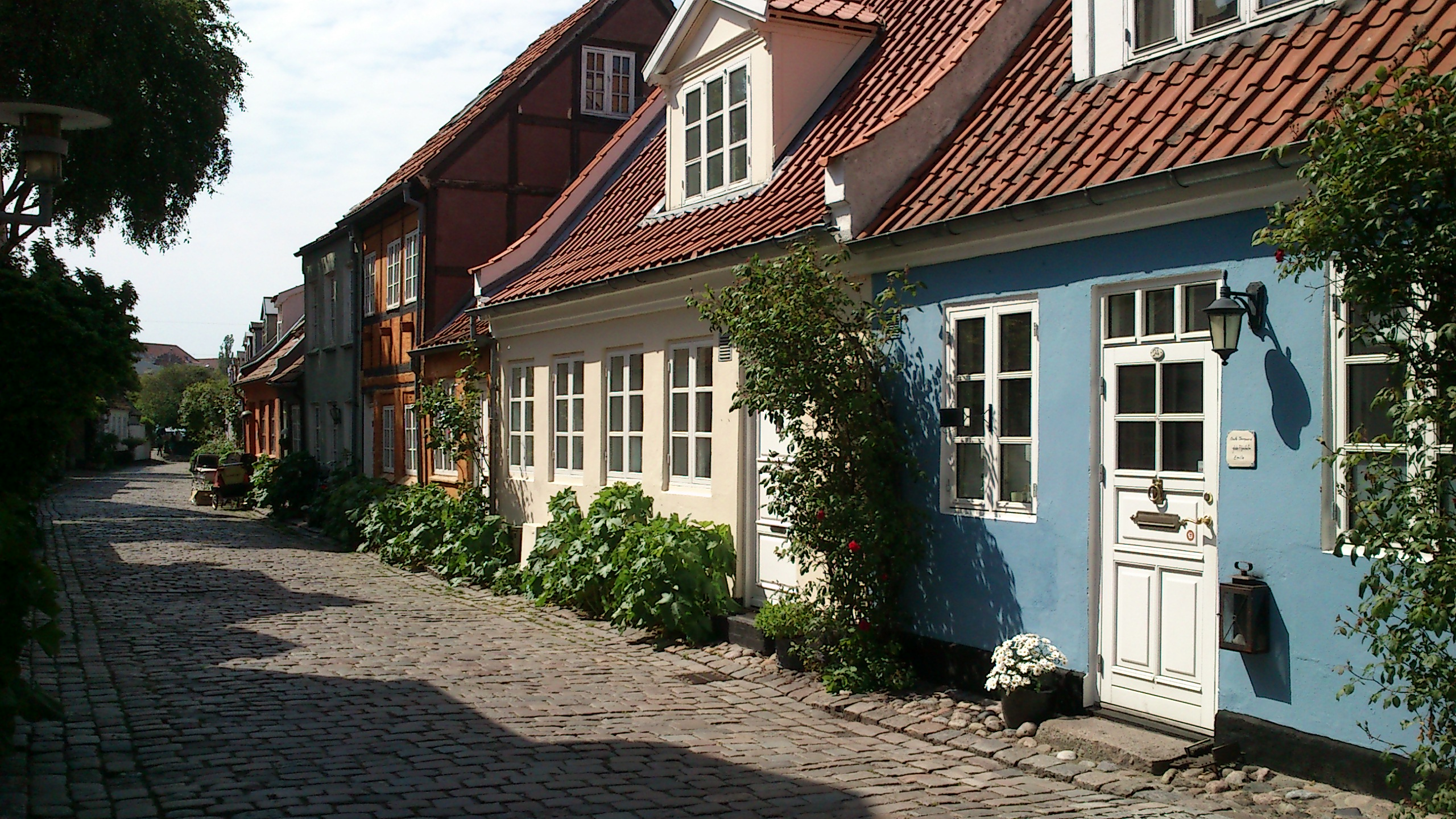

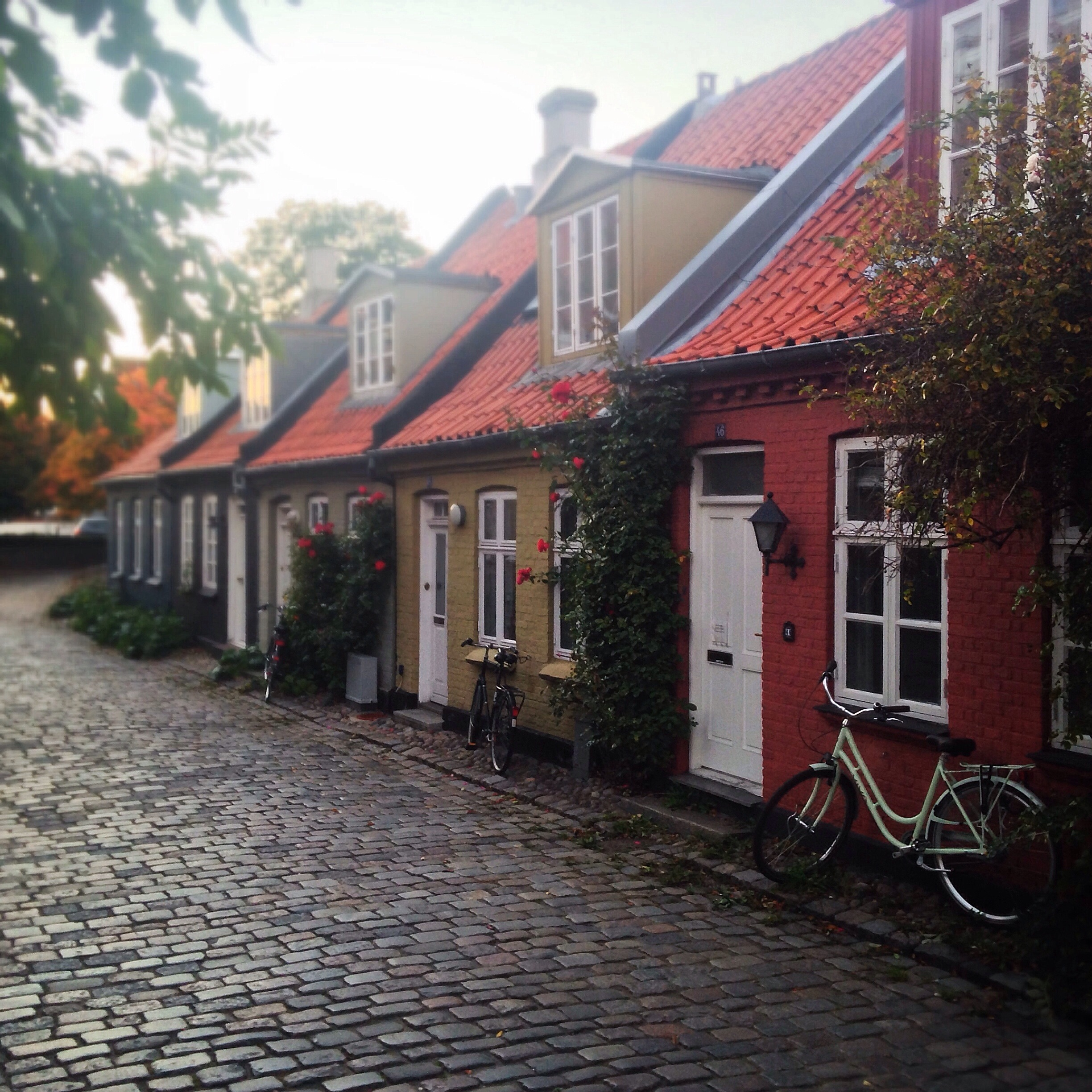
