= Vejlby =

- Neighborhood
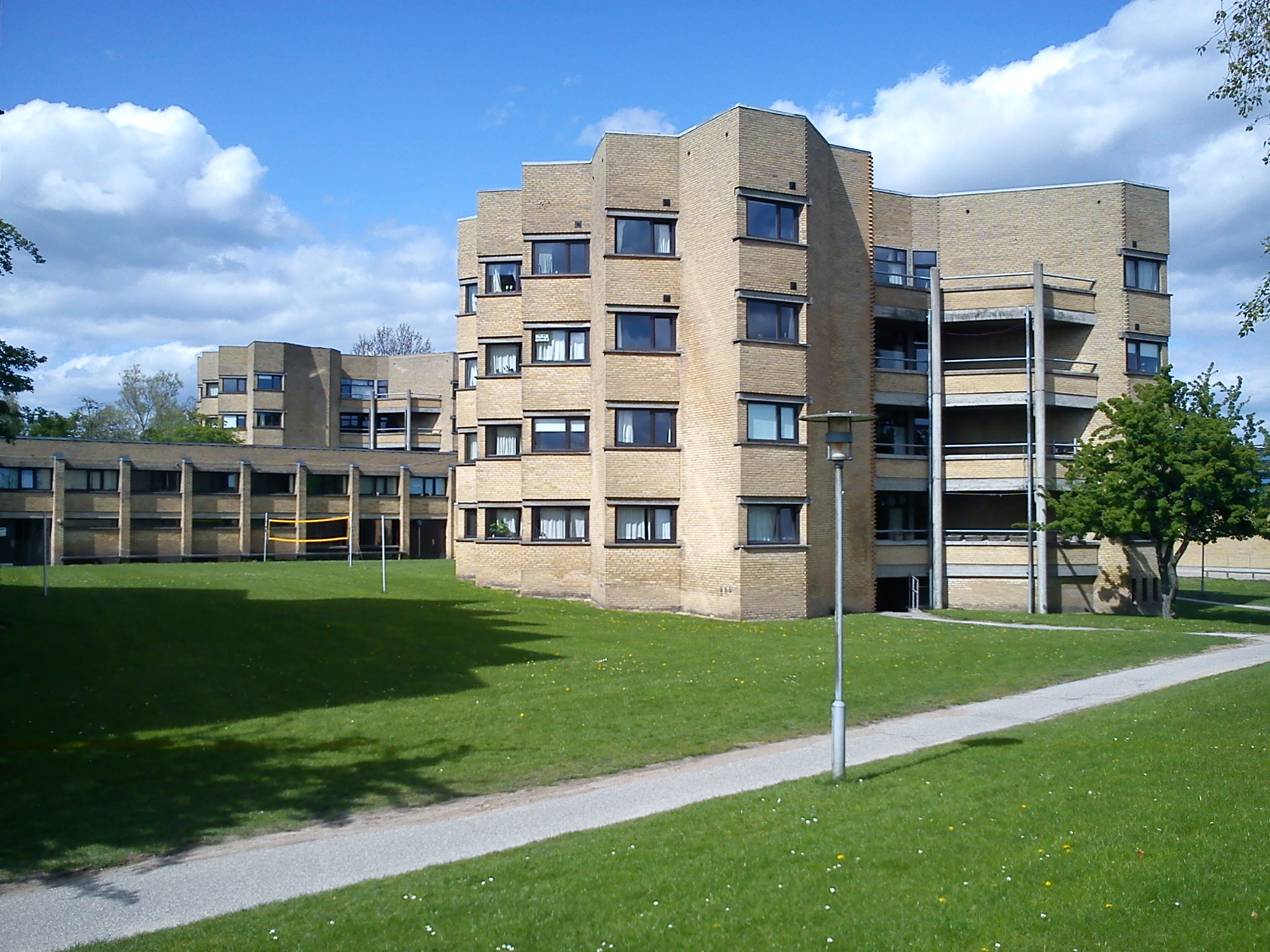
- Børglum Kollegiet (dormitory) is a landmark for Vejlby

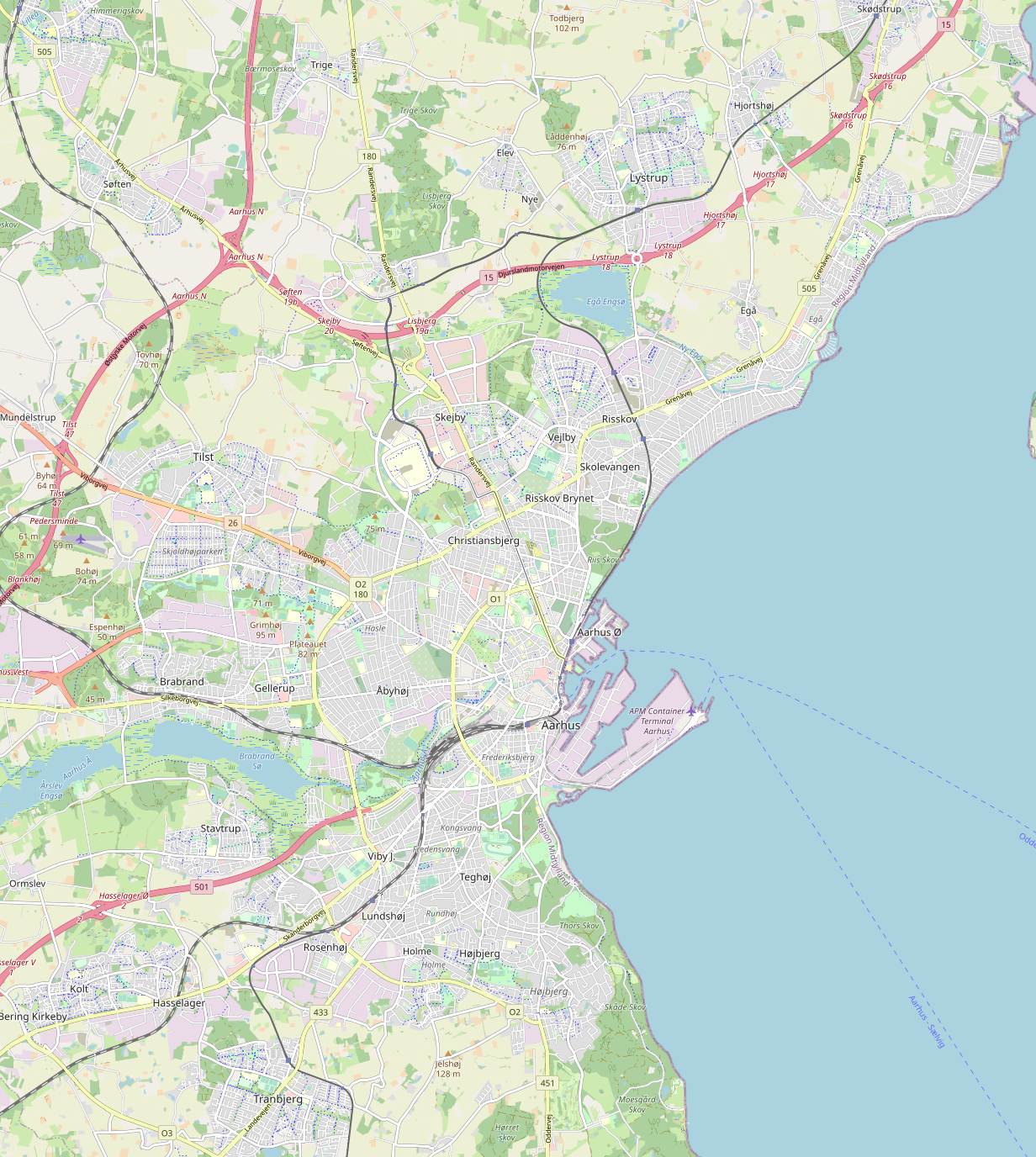
- Location within Aarhus
- Coordinates: 56.196237°N 10.204198°E
- Country: Kingdom of Denmark
- Regions of Denmark: Central Denmark Region
- Municipality: Aarhus Municipality
- District: Risskov
- Postal code: 8240

Vejlby is a north-eastern neighbourhood of Aarhus in Denmark. It is located 5km from the city centre and is administratively part of the district of Risskov.

== Name and administrative history ==
Vejlby has a long and somewhat complicated administrative history. Originally a farming village, its own parish and municipality, the adjacent neighbourhood Risskov was also administered as part of Vejlby Municipality. As Risskov grew and developed a great deal during the industrialisation, Vejlby Kommune changed its name to Vejlby-Risskov Kommune in 1929, to reflect the growing importance of Risskov. In 1940, Risskov got its own parish, while still a part of Vejlby-Risskov Municipality. In the 1970 municipal reform of Denmark, Vejlby-Risskov Municipality was merged with Aarhus Municipality. Because of the long, shared history, the neighbourhoods of Vejlby and Risskov, are often referred to as Vejlby-Risskov today.

There are several other places named Vejlby in Denmark, including a small village in the vicinity of Grenå on Mols, featured in the acclaimed novella "The Rector of Veilbye" by Steen Steensen Blicher.

== Townscape ==
Once a rural village and a suburb, Vejlby has now completely merged with the city of Aarhus, but can still present areas characterised by the old village in the vicinity of the old church and graveyard. Modern buildings of note, are the shopping mall of Veri Center, the dormitory of Børglum Kollegiet with its notable architecture, a nursing and retirement centre, the large sports complex of Vejlby-Risskov Idrætscenter, the large residential areas of Veriparken, Næringen & Nyringen and Kantorparken. Important educational buildings comprise the Risskov Gymnasium (STX) and Handelsgymnasiet Vejlby (HHX). The only notable green area in Vejlby is Mollerup Skov.

== Gallery ==
Landmarks and institutions

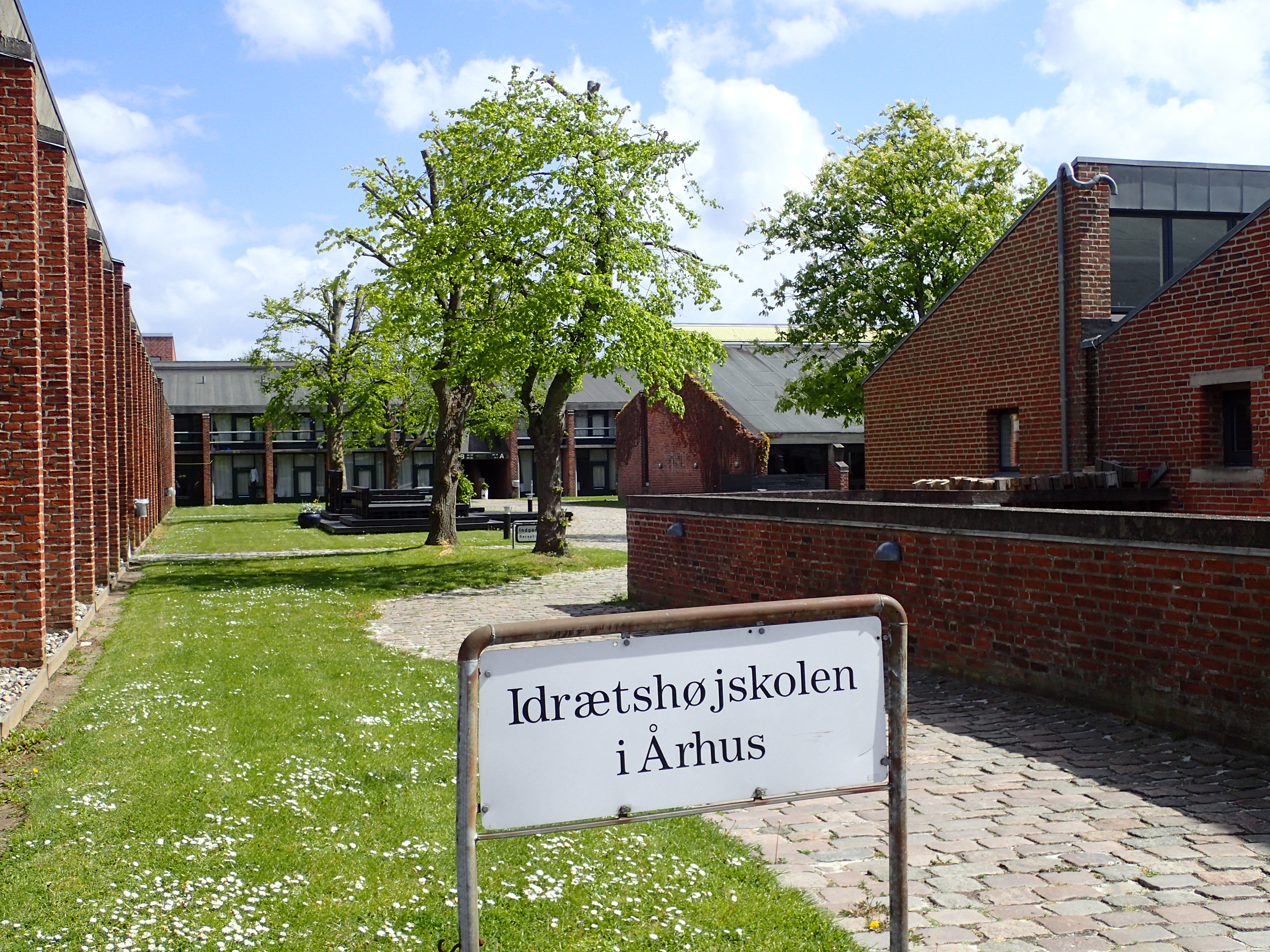
Idrætshøjskolen Århus.

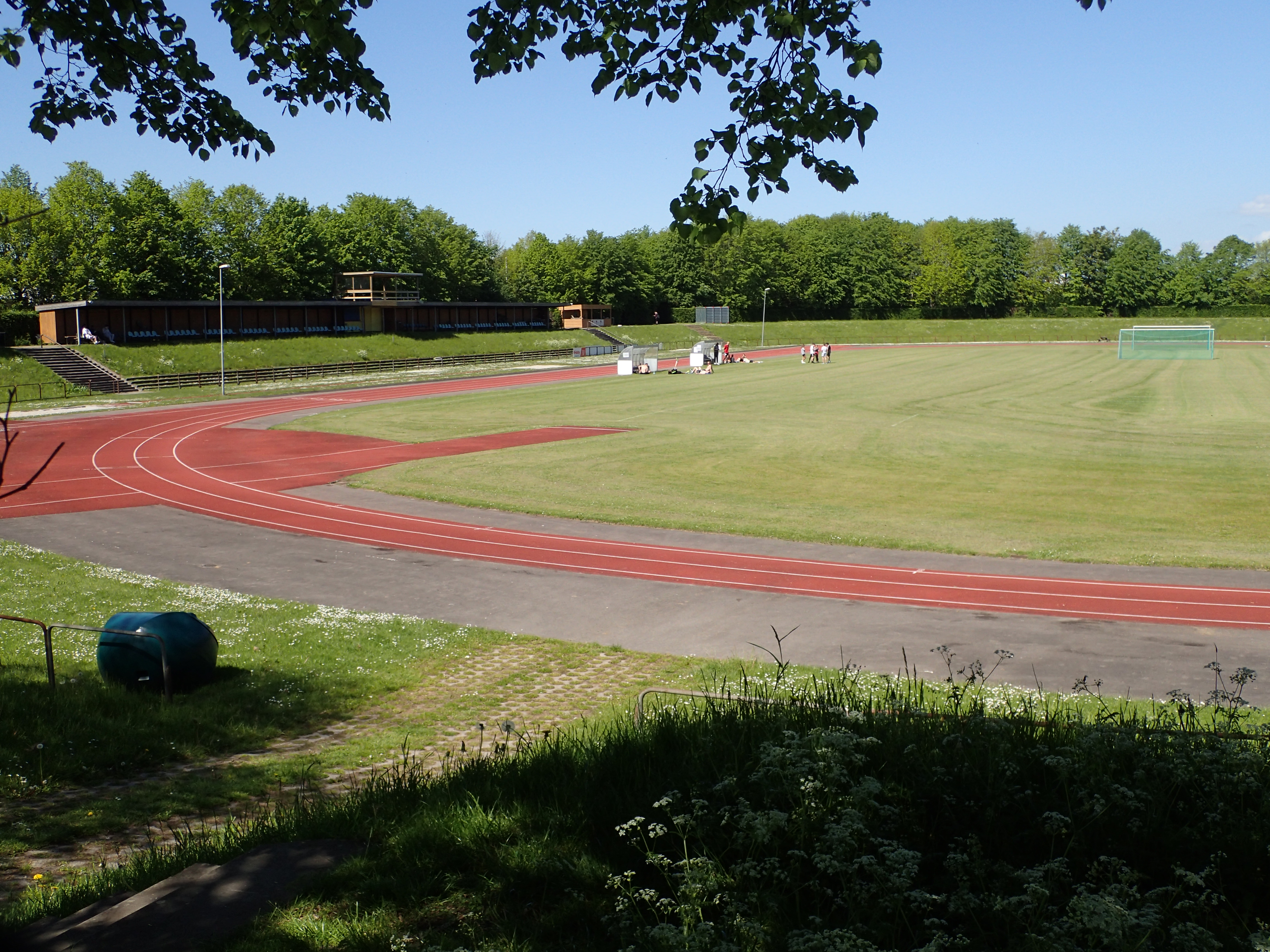
Vejlby stadium

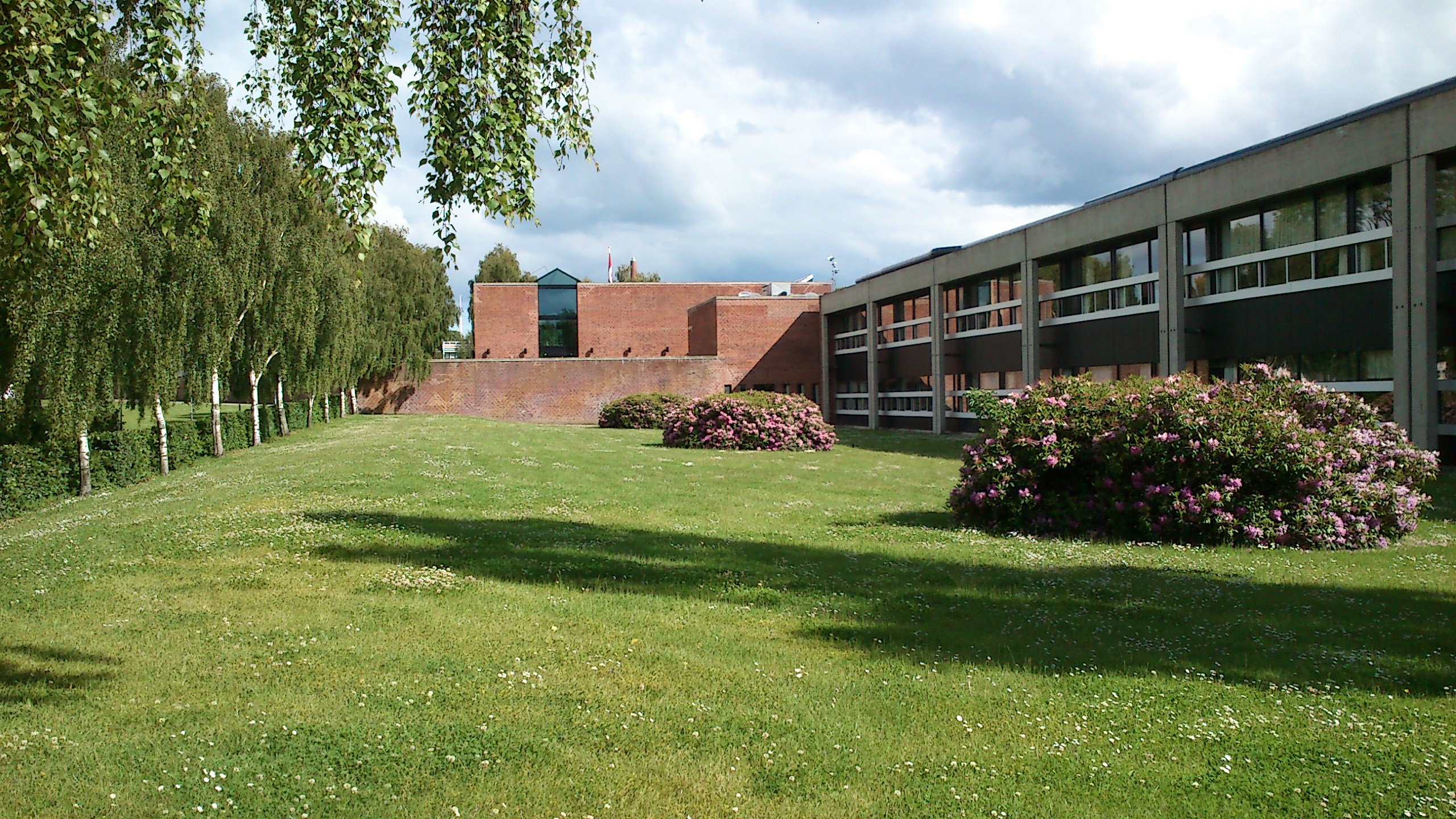
Risskov Gymnasium.

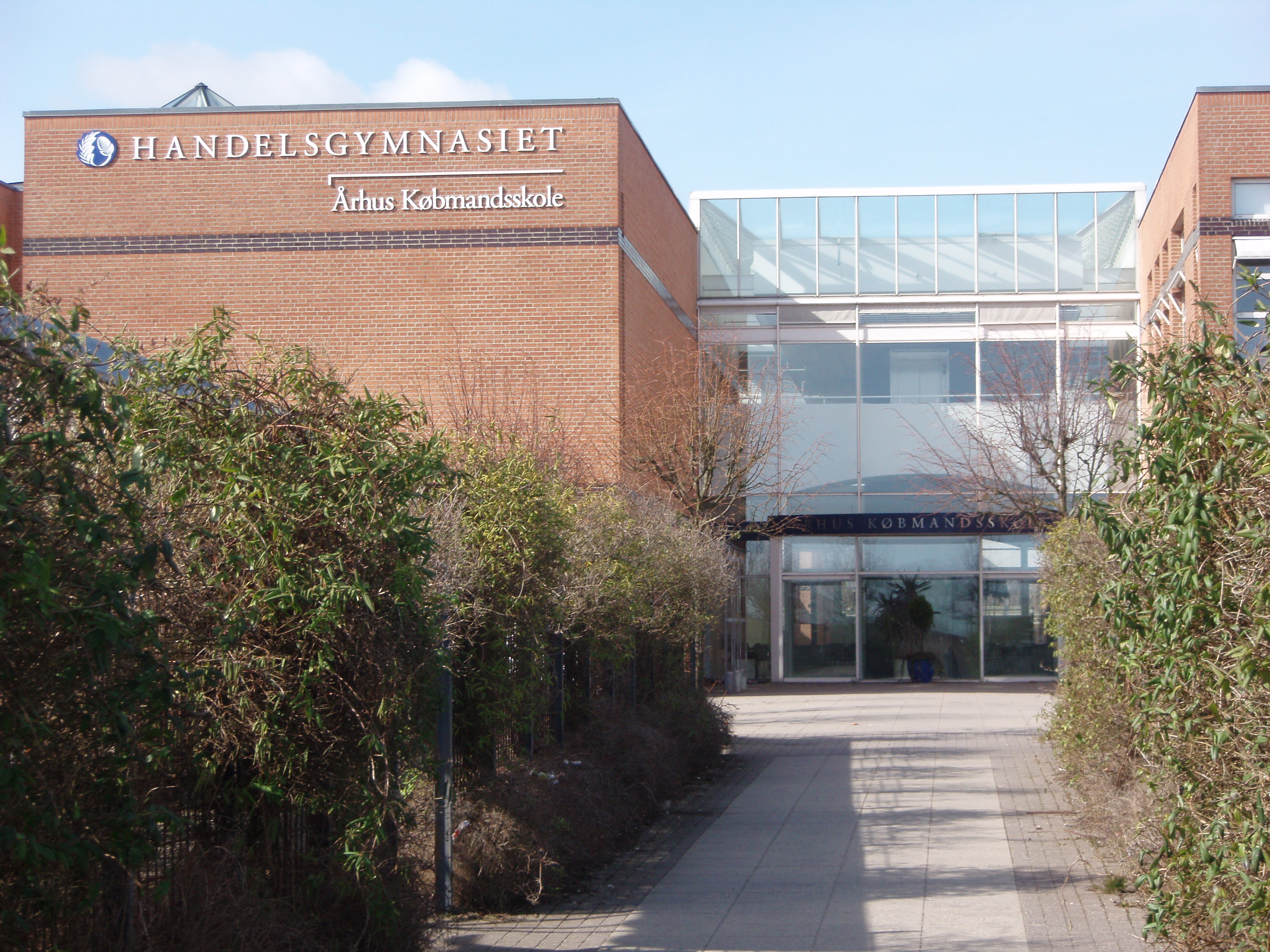
Aarhus Business College

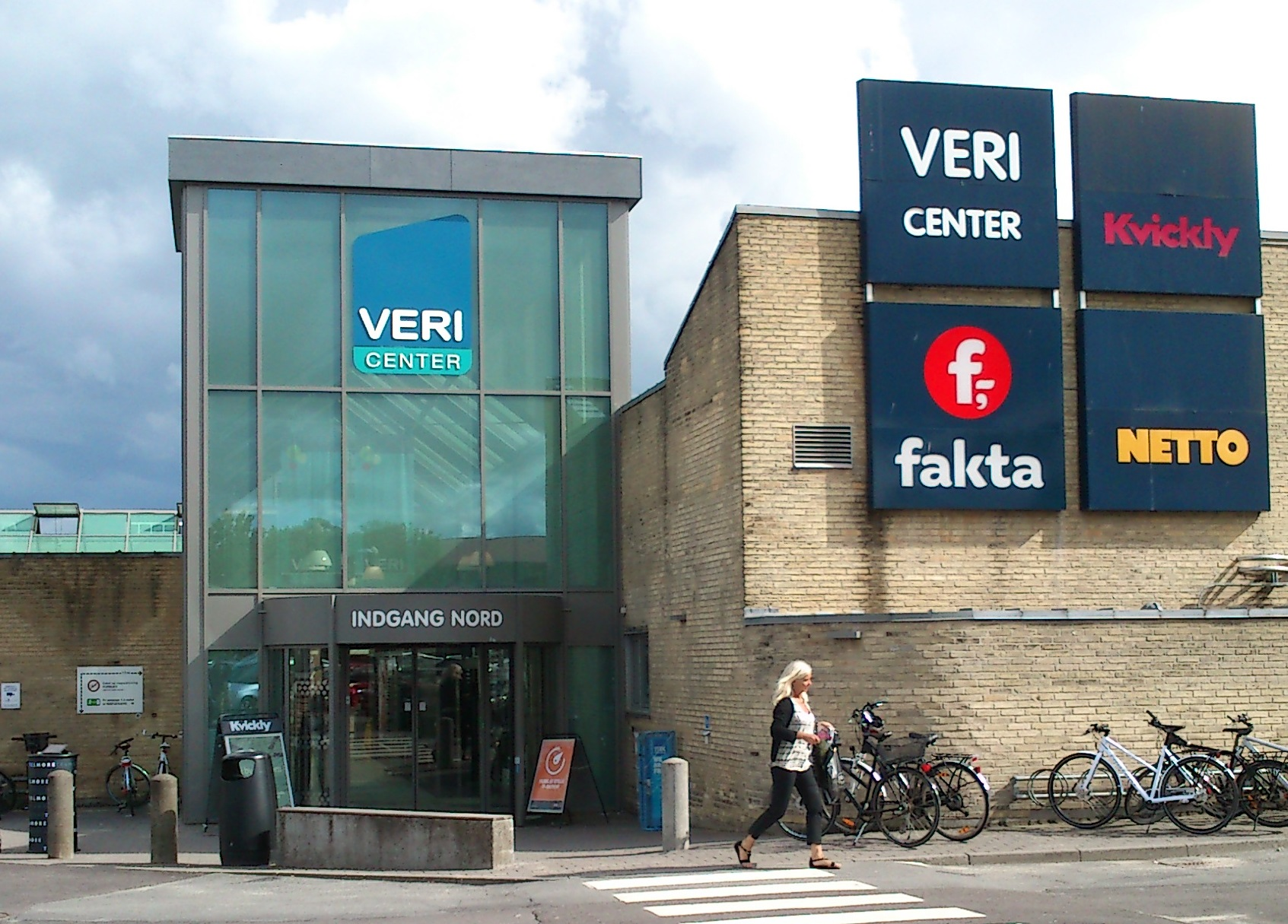
The Veri Center mall

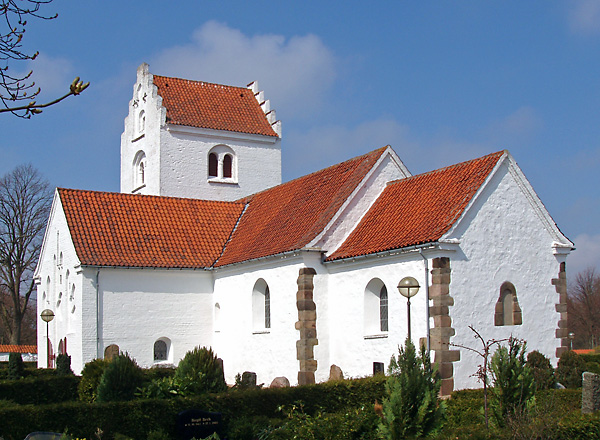
The old village church of Vejlby Church.

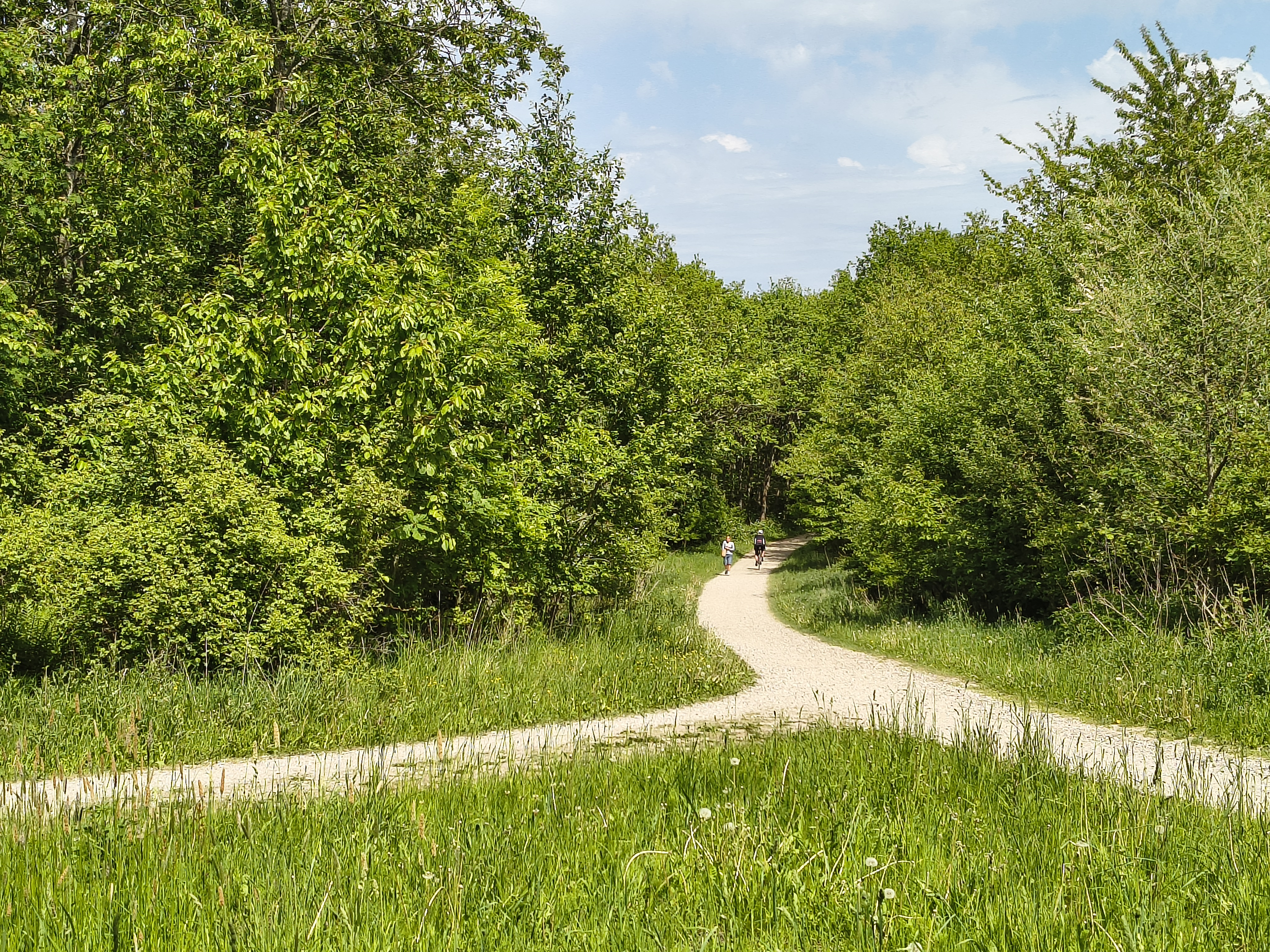
From the forest of Mollerup Skov.

Residential buildings

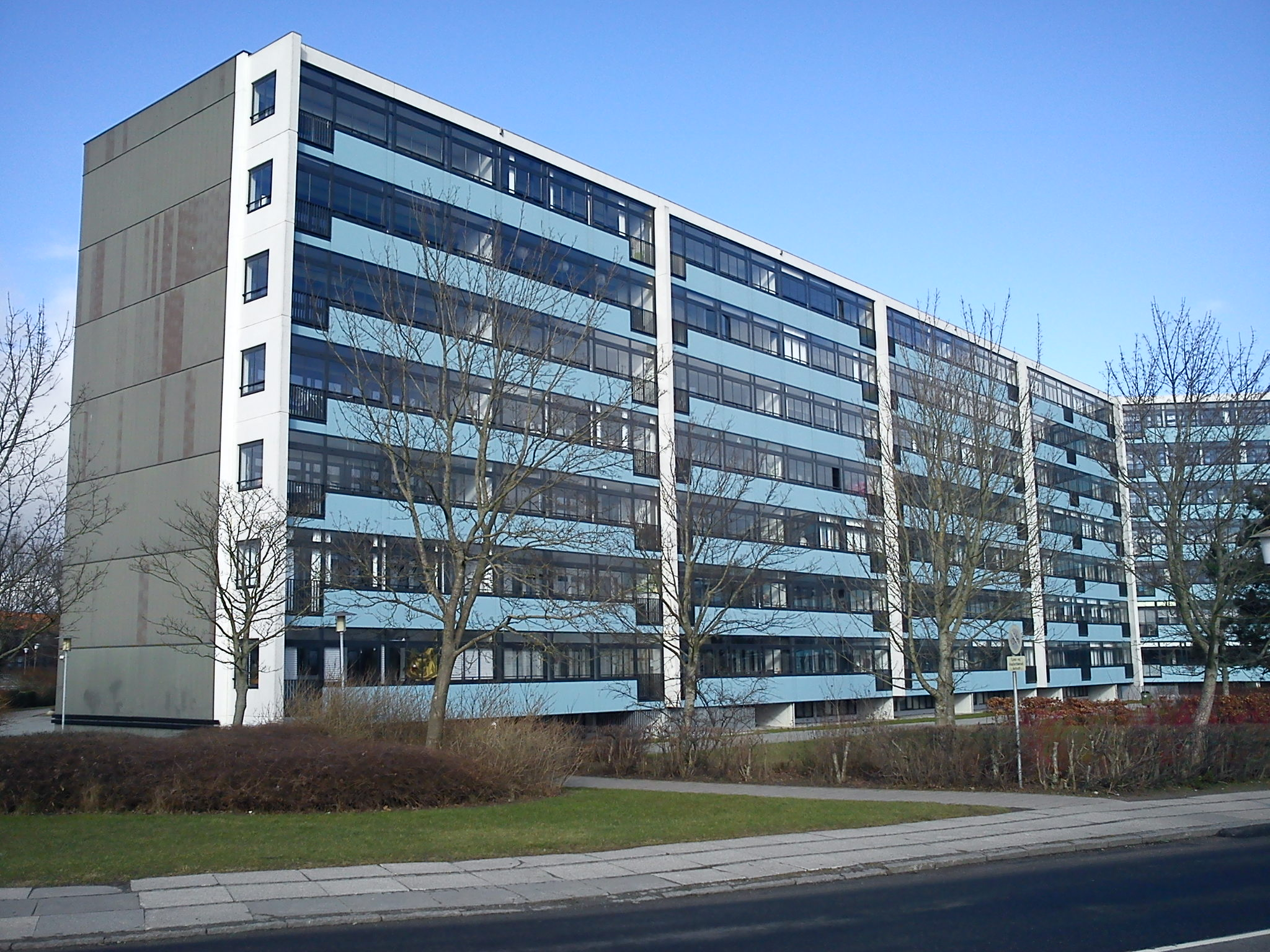
Veri Parken public housing apartment blocks

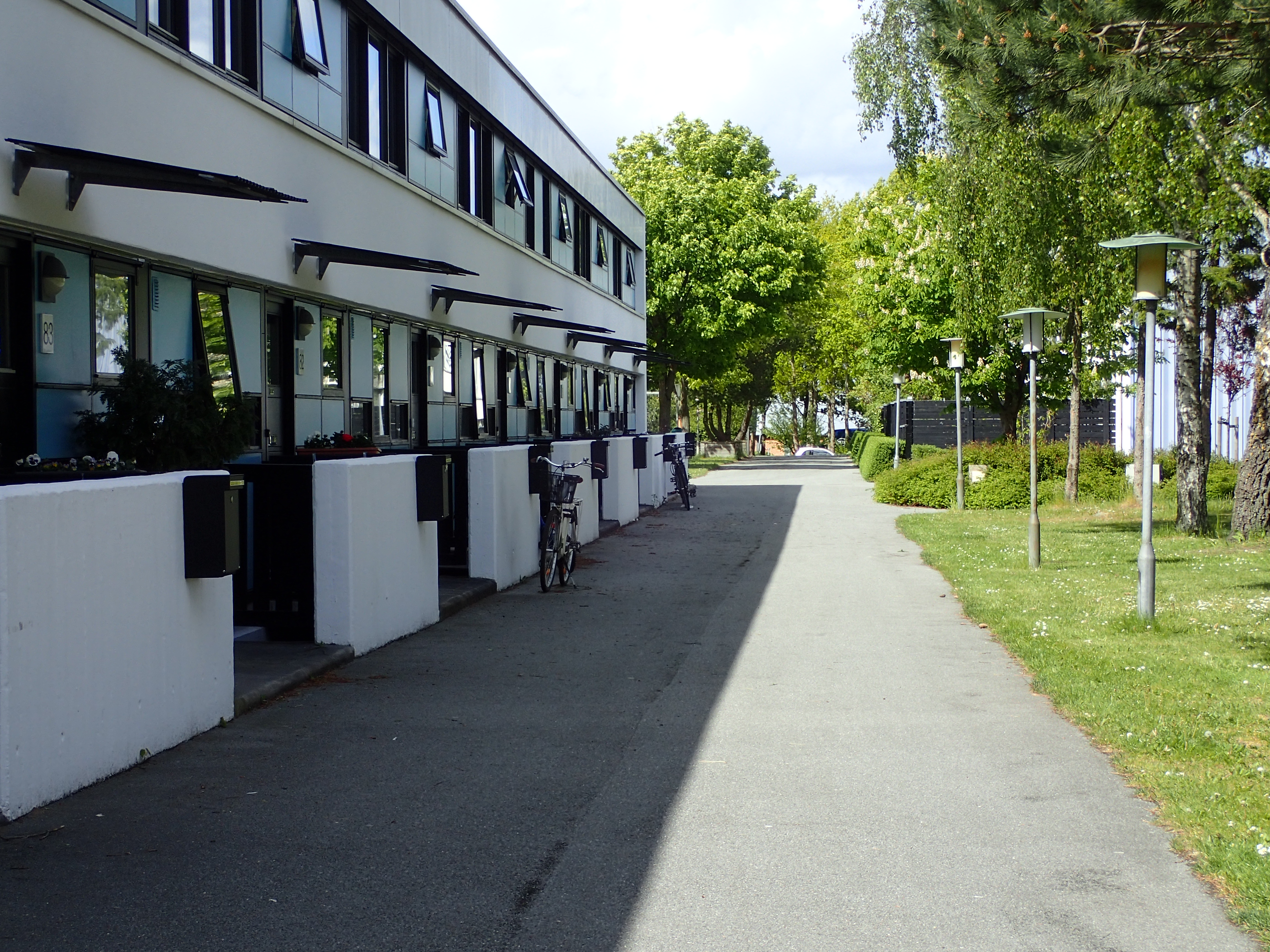
Vejlby Vest (also known as Nyringen & Næringen), a public housing borough

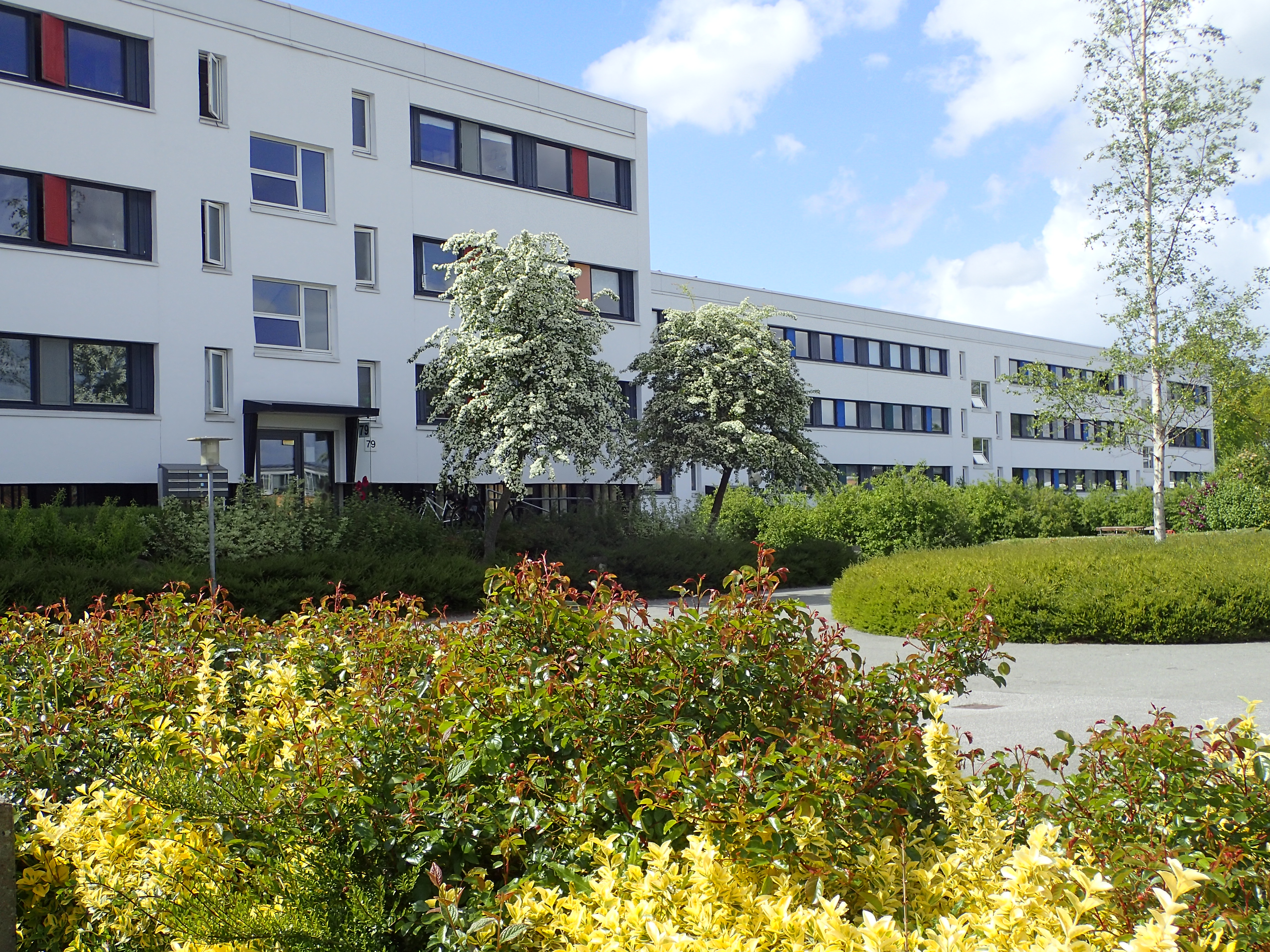

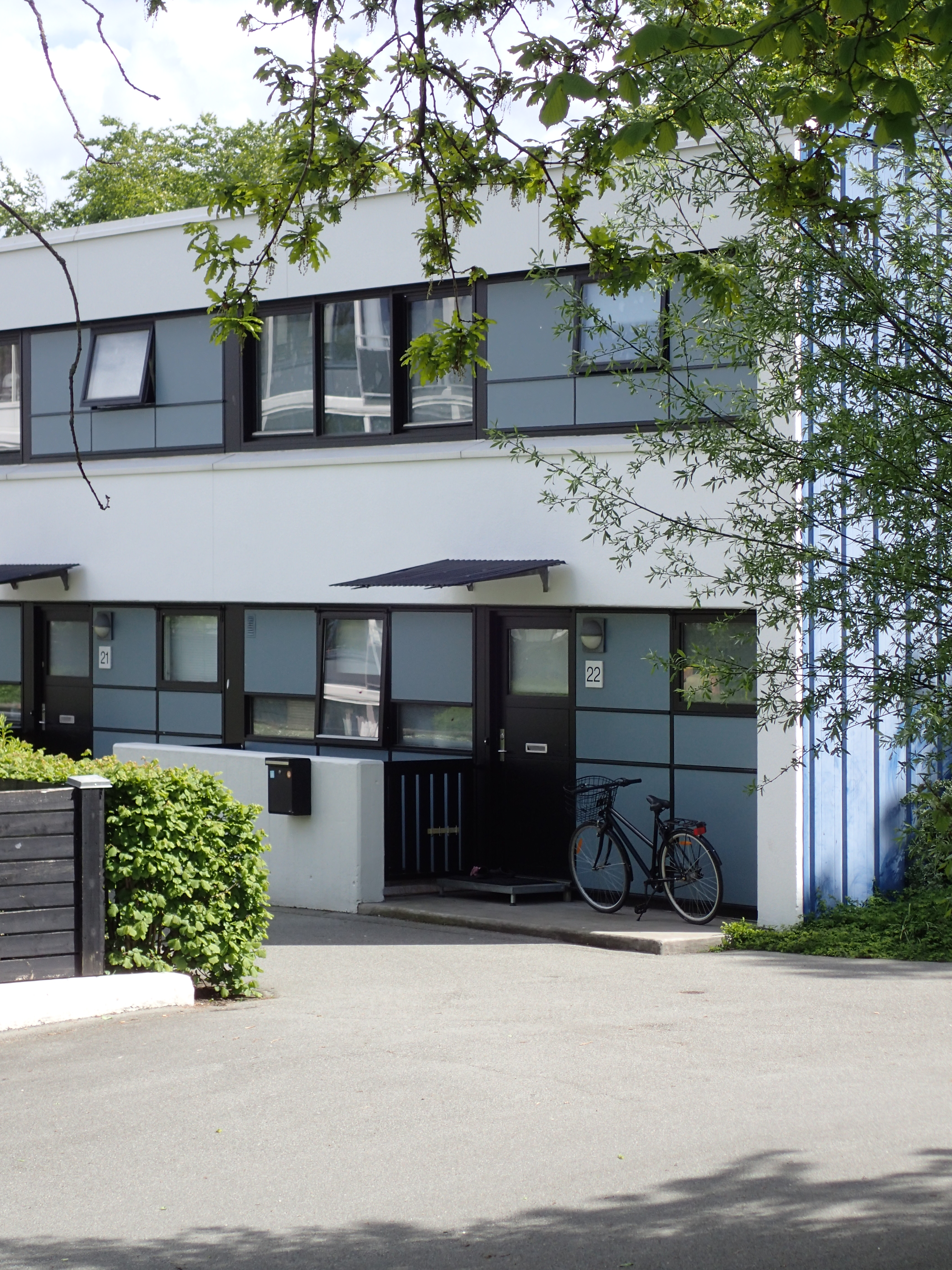

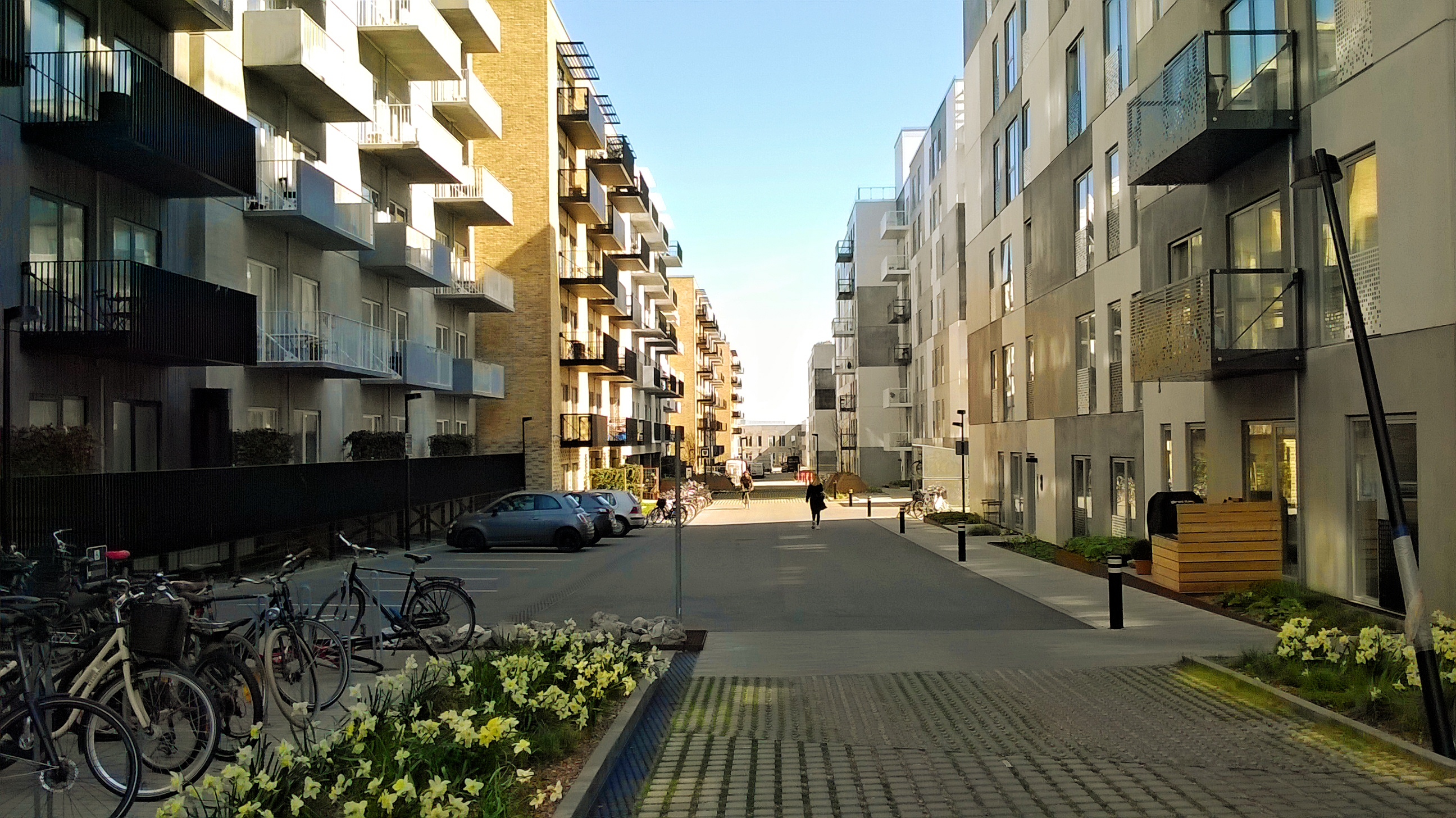
Risskov Brynet, a new borough under development

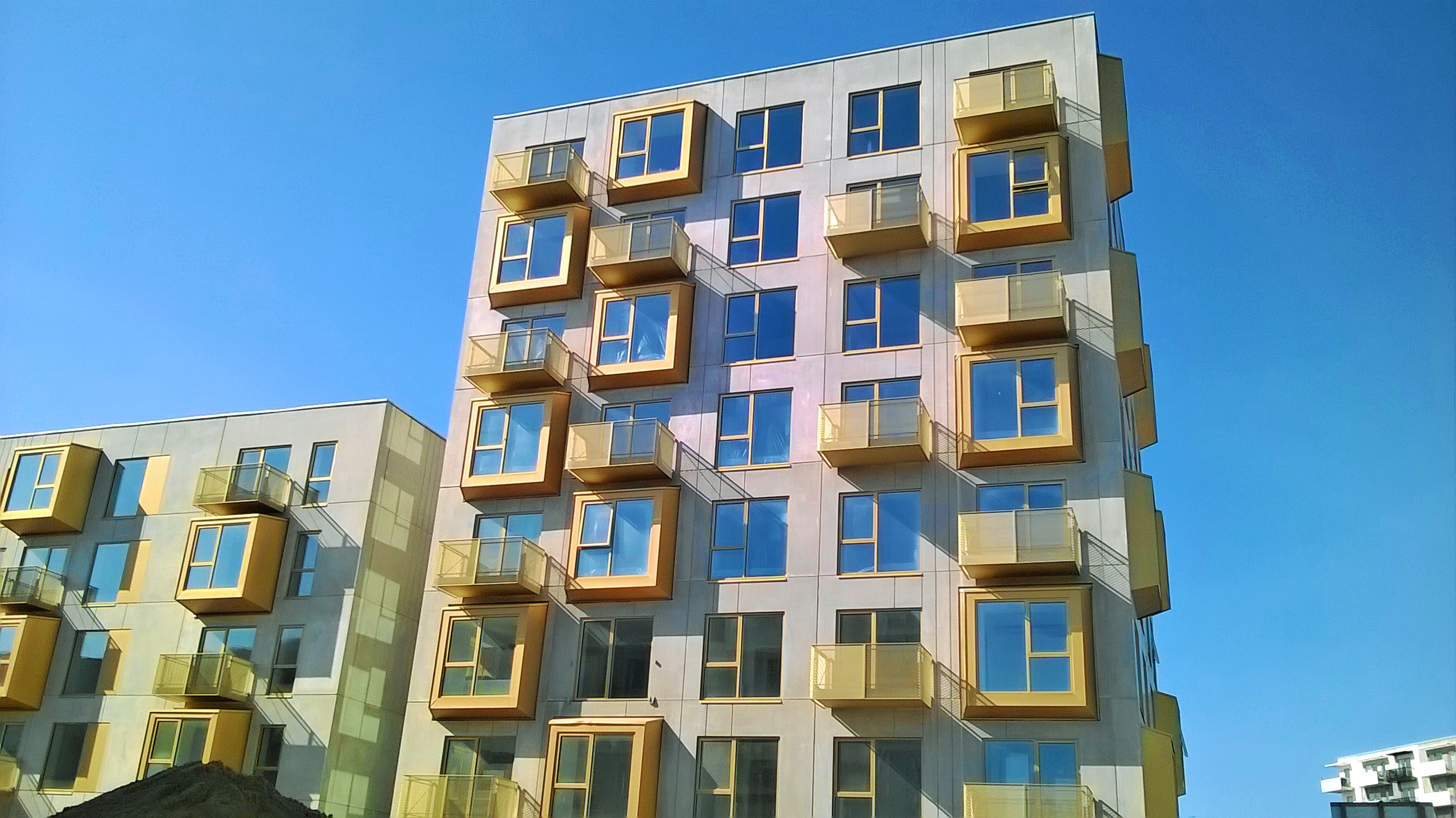

== Sources ==
- "'Vejlby' i Aarhus Arkivet" (in Danish). Aarhus Stadsarkiv.
- "Vejlby-Risskov Lokalhistoriske Arkiv" [Vejlby-Risskov Local History Archive] (in Danish).
