= Børglum Hall =

Dormitory in Aarhus, Denmark

- Børglum Kollegiet
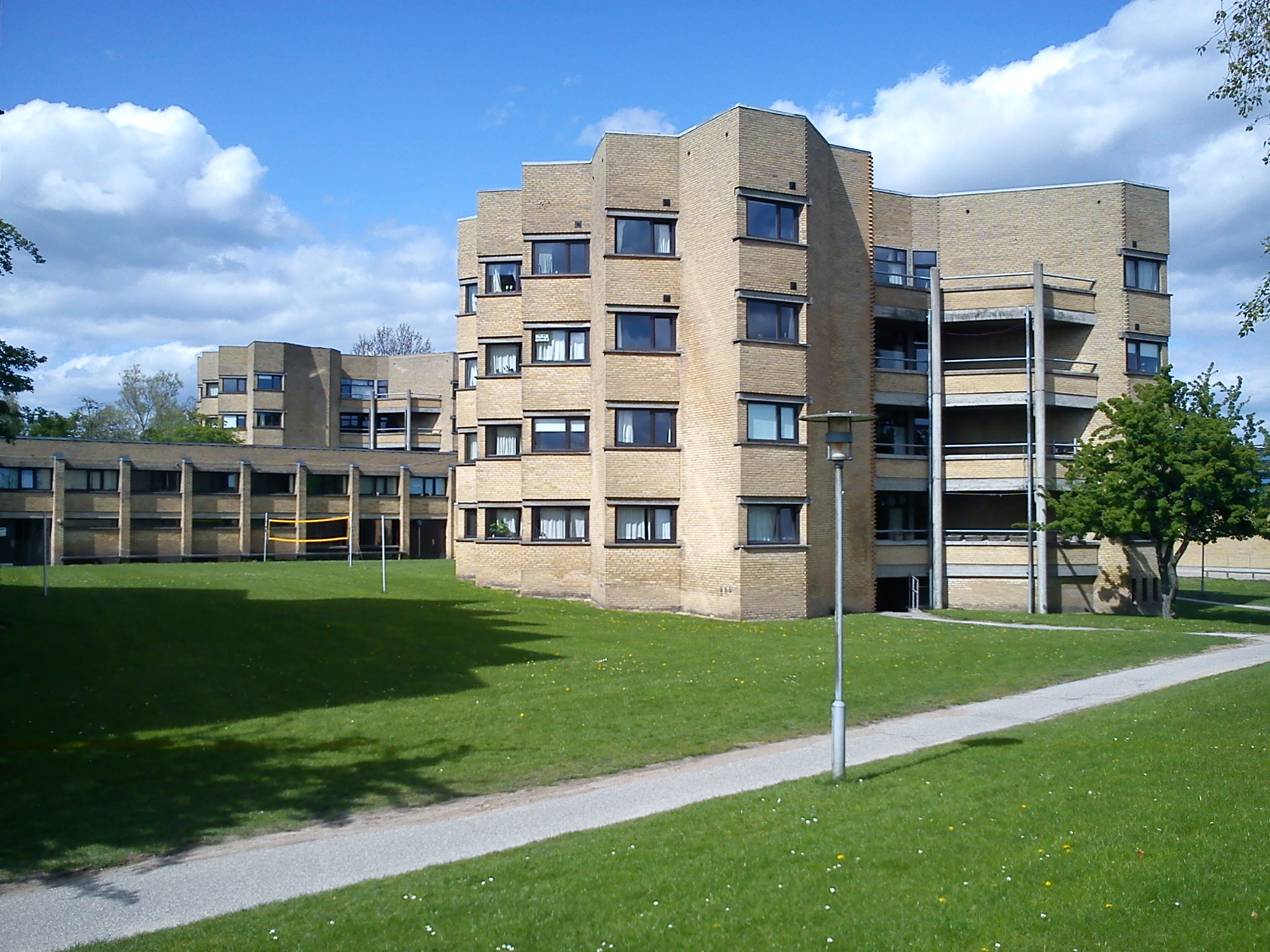
- Børglum Hall. A community block viewed from the south.
- Interactive map of the Børglum Hall area

General information
- Type: Dormitory
- Architectural style: Modernist
- Location: Aarhus, Denmark
- Coordinates: 56.18819°N 10.21240°E
- Completed: 1967

Technical details
- Material: Brick, concrete, ceramic tile
- Floor count: 4

Design and construction
- Architect: Harald Salling-Mortensen

Børglum Hall (Danish: Børglum Kollegiet) is a dormitory in the Vejlby neighborhood in Aarhus, Denmark. It is situated at the Vejlby Ringvej ring road next to the Veri Center shopping mall. The dormitory complex consists of a building cluster of seven free standing four-story buildings in yellow brick, designed by architect Harald Salling-Mortensen and completed in 1967, and a newer addition of three apartment blocks from 1992. Børglum is a self-owning institution which can house up to 489 students, of any grade or gender, within cycling distance of Aarhus University.

== Architecture ==
The original, and largest, part of Børglum Hall was built during the 1960s when the dormitory style of housing was hotly debated. It was designed as a nontraditional ensemble of buildings, heavily inspired by the works of Finnish architect and artist Alvar Aalto. The building material and appearance bears some resemblance to Aalto's Aalto Theatre in Essen. The project called for an organic complex design with seven fan-shaped buildings connected to a low community center by hallways, like flowers on a stalk.

The individual buildings are designed similarly to the overall plan for the complex. In the middle of the building is the main staircase, kitchen and community room surrounded by a curved, narrow corridor with entrances to the individual rooms. Originally the buildings had six rooms facing east and eight facing west, all with unique positioning and lighting conditions. The corridor and the room hallways are used as a buffer zone so noise and music from the community room does not unnecessarily bother inhabitants. The community blocks are equipped with a south-facing balcony.

The community rooms in the individual blocks are situated centrally in order to minimize noise to nearby buildings. The connecting hallways between the buildings and the community center are a series of covered hallways on the ground floor through a shared garden. The community center, like the residential blocks, is characterized by soft, curved hallways and sloping ramps. It functions as the social and cultural center of the entire complex with a wide array of amenities and community facilities.

== Amenities ==
The complex consists of 7 four-story buildings with 14 single rooms on each floor. In addition there are four 1½ room apartments and one apartment with a kitchen. Individual buildings has community rooms and the overall complex has a larger, central community facility. The central facility has reception, mailboxes, offices, meeting rooms, fitness rooms, billiard and pool rooms, guest rooms, fireplace and banquet room.

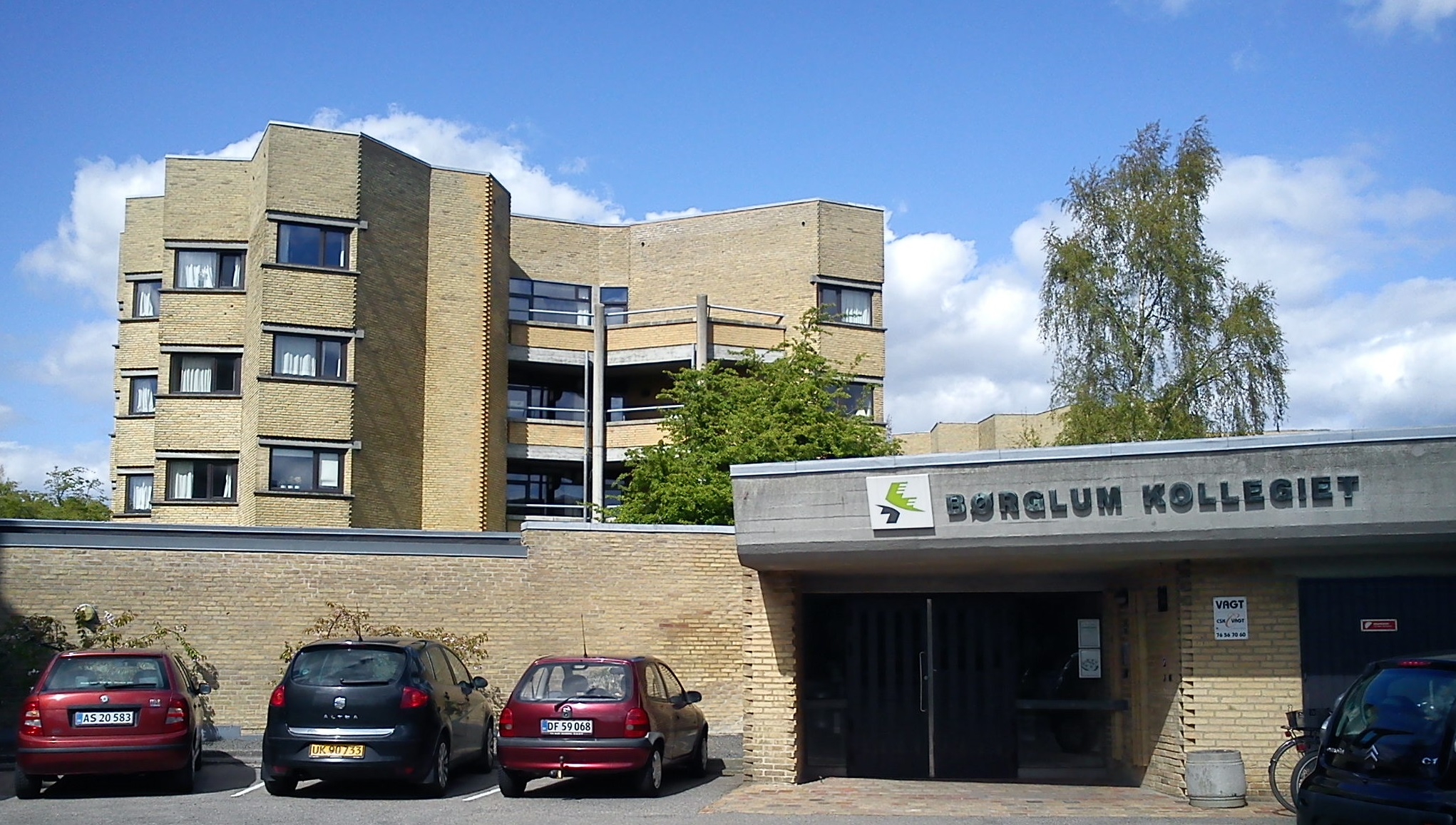

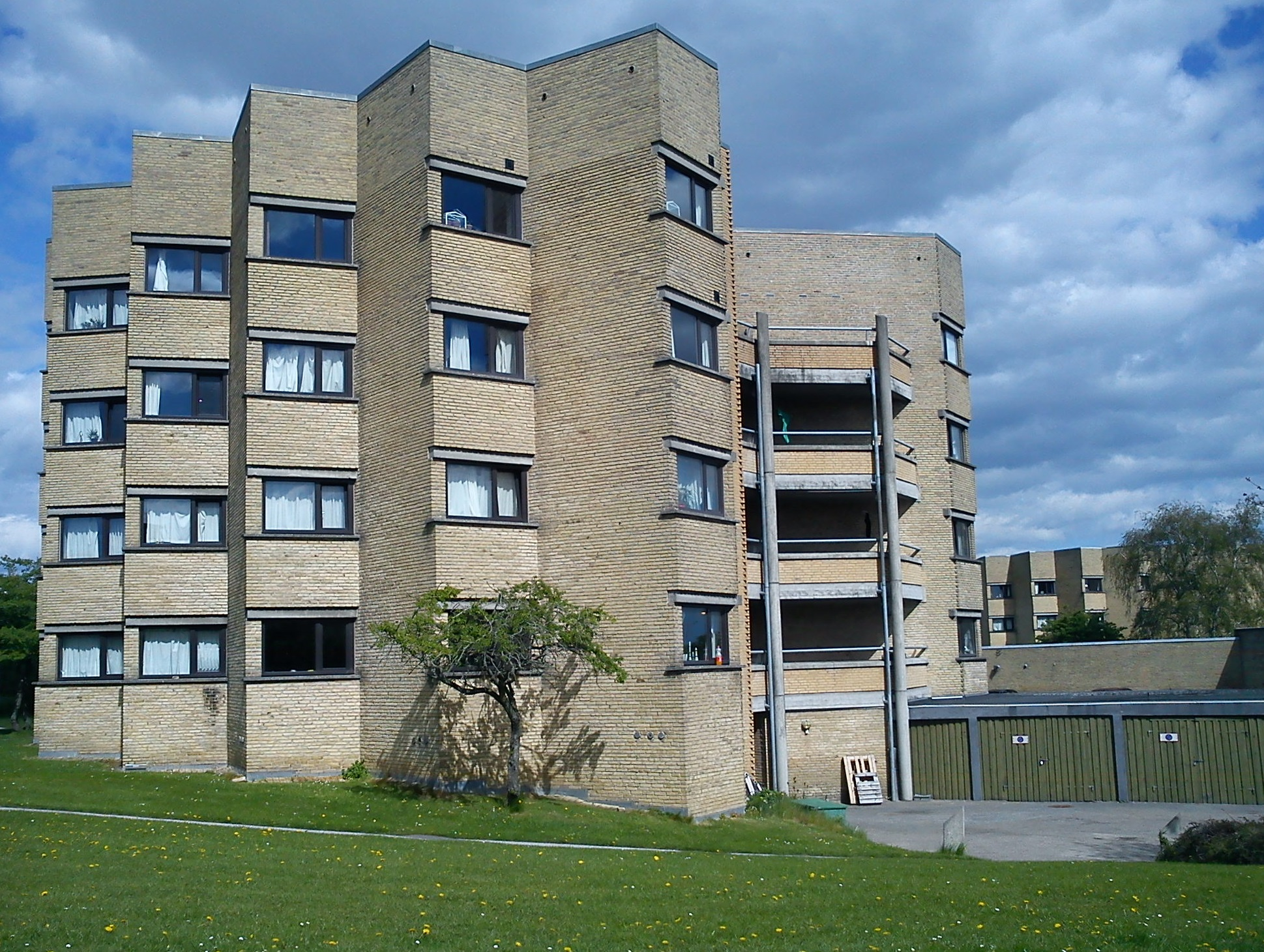

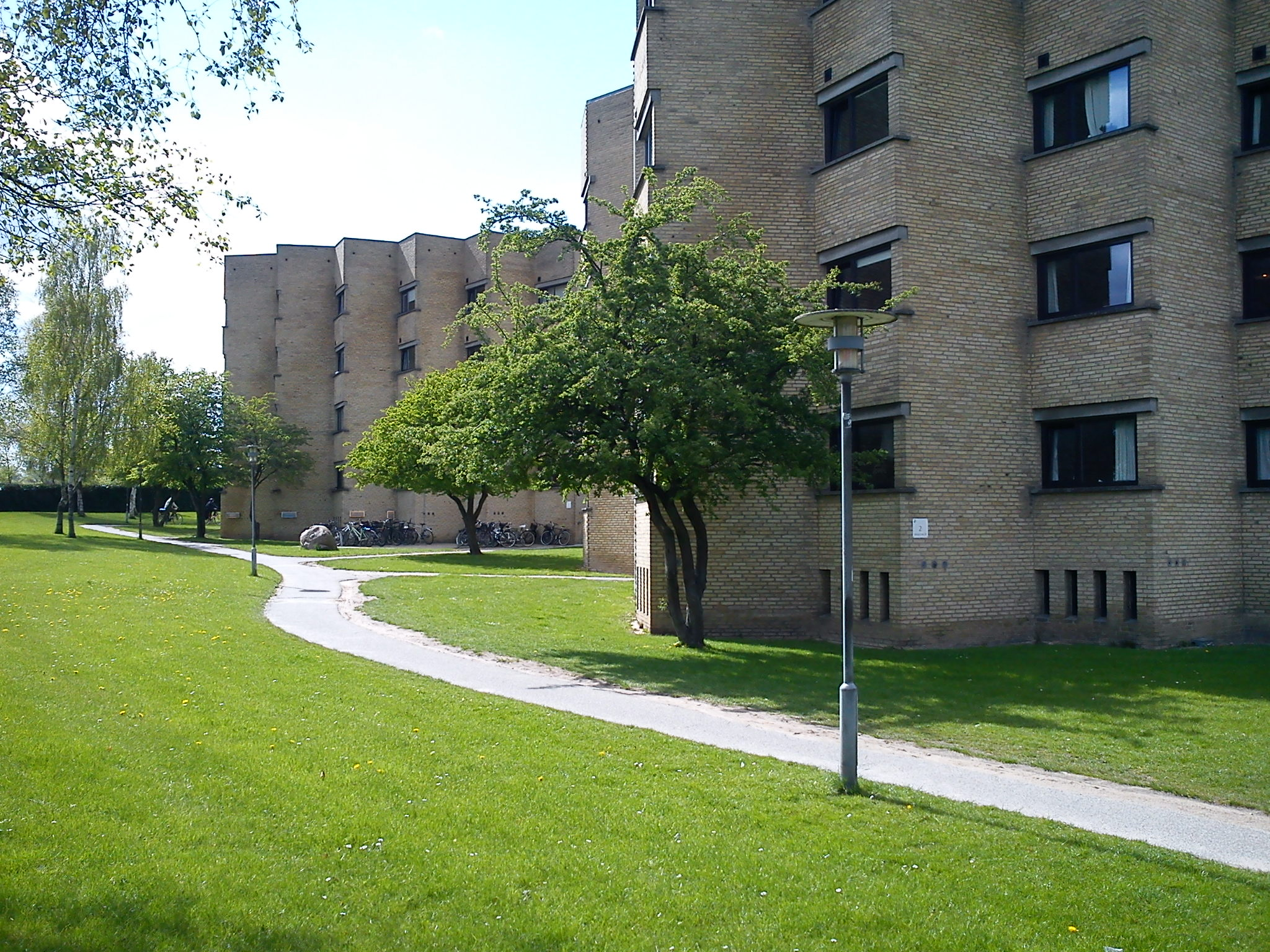

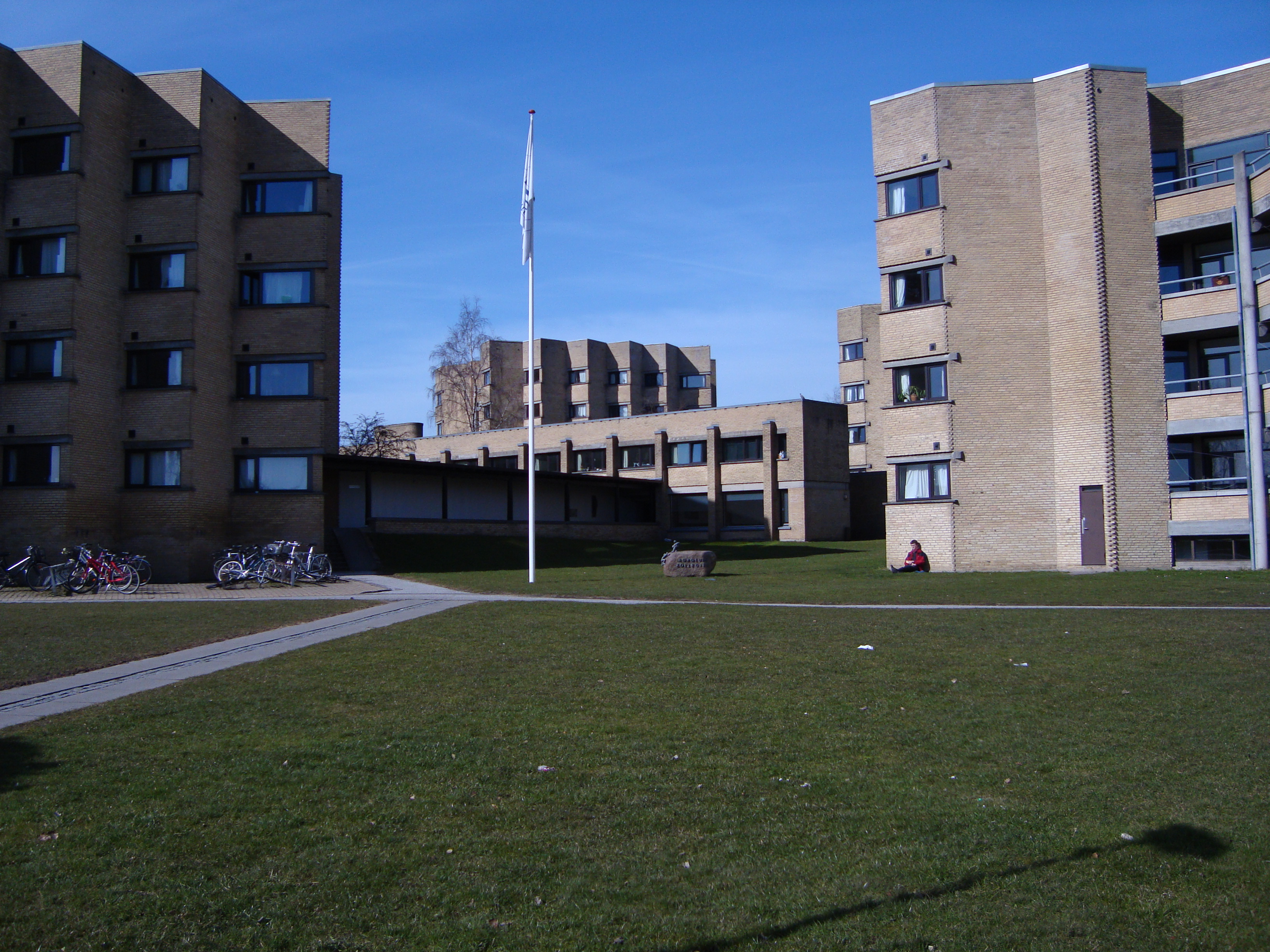

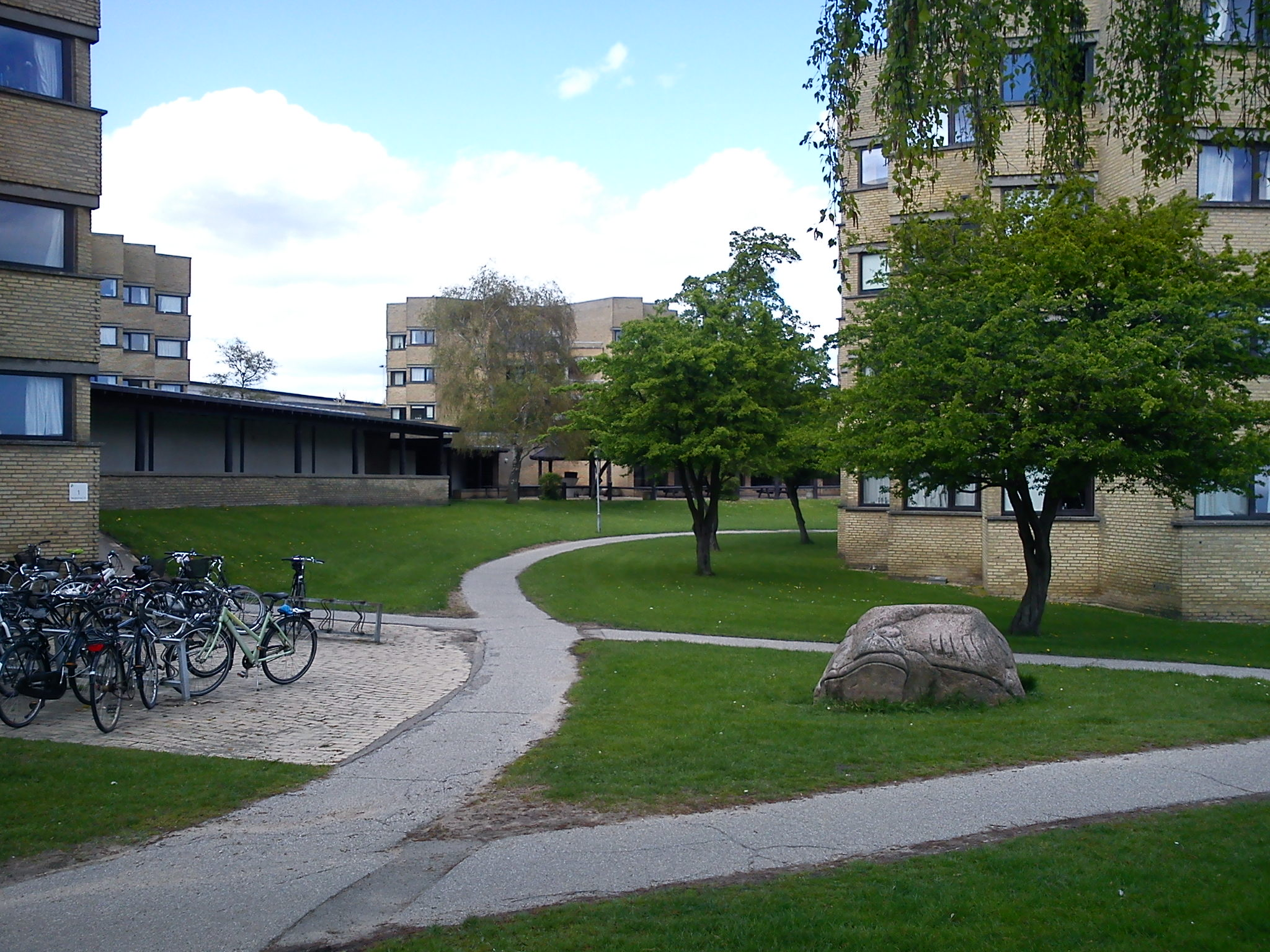
