= Risskov Gymnasium =

School in Aarhus, Denmark

Coordinates: 56.1944°N 10.2097°E

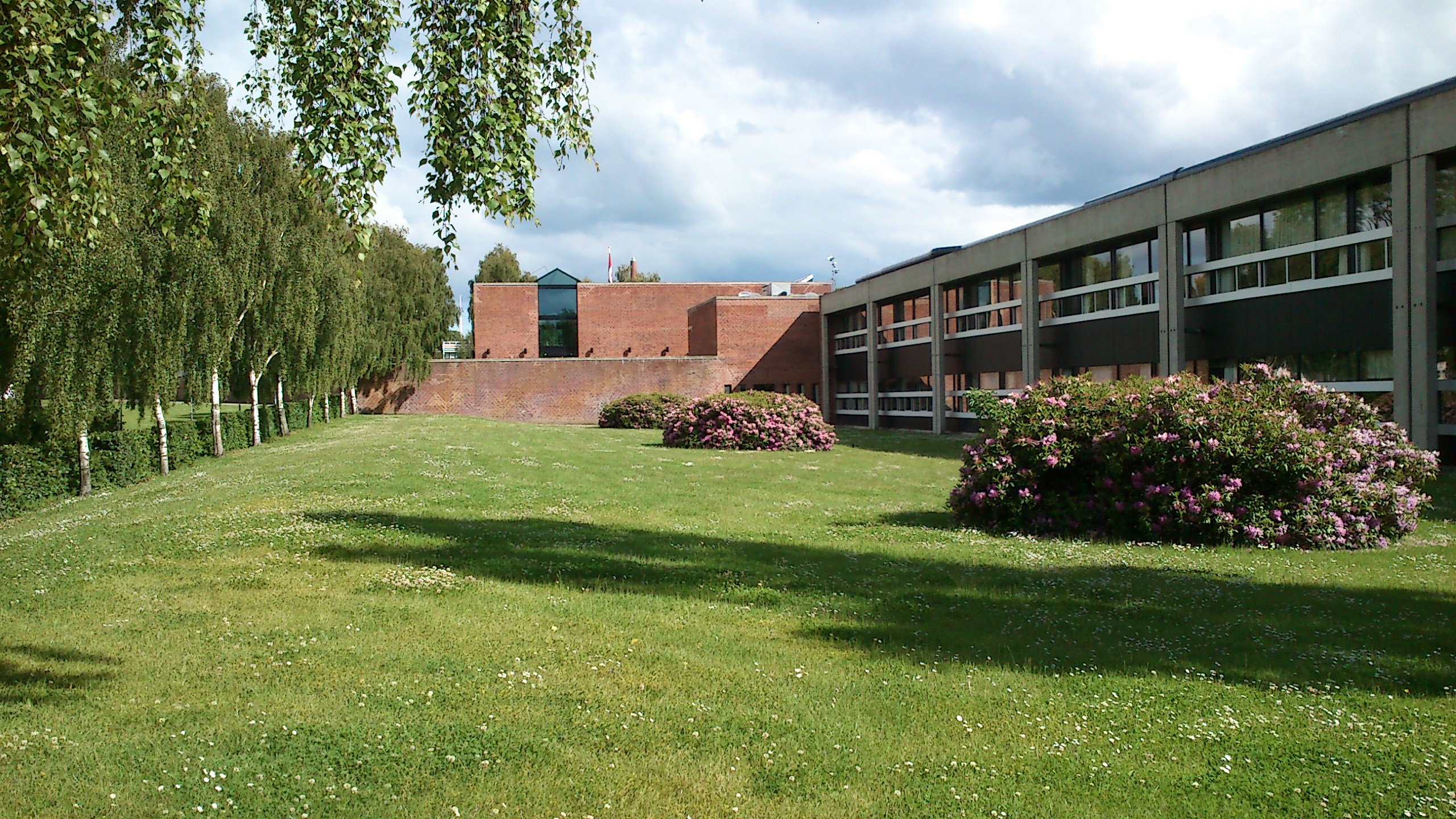
- Risskov Gymnasium
- Type: Secondary education
- Established: 1968
- Principal: Gitte Horsbøl (2015)
- Academic staff: 80-90
- Administrative staff: 20
- Students: 800 (2015)
- Location: Aarhus, Denmark
- Website: http://www.risskov-gym.dk/

Risskov Gymnasium is a school of secondary education and a Danish gymnasium in Aarhus, Denmark. The school is a financially independent self-owning educational institution under the Danish state. The school offers the 3 year matriculation examination (STX) programme within four main branches: natural sciences, political sciences, language and art.

The school has approximately 800 students enlisted ranging from 15 to 19 years old with 10 new classes beginning every year. The student body is divided between 30 classes divided in Freshman, Junior and Senior year.

== Programmes ==
The natural science programme includes subjects such as biotechnology, physics, chemistry and biology; the political science programme subjects such as social studies, economics, psychology and media studies; and language and arts programmes with subjects such as French, Spanish, German, Latin, Greek and music.

Besides these profile subjects we teach a number of mandatory subjects such as math, English, social studies and Danish, as well as approximately 25 select subjects ranging from astronomy over philosophy to physical education.

== History ==
Risskov Gymnasium was originally Amtsgymnasiet, Vejlby-Risskov (Danish: County Gymnasium, Vejlby-Risskov). In the 1960s the school commission in the, now defunct, Vejlby-Risskov Municipality suggested that the fifth gymnasium in the vicinity of Aarhus should be placed in Vejlby. However, a municipal reform had been announced so the municipalities surrounding Aarhus and Aarhus County collaborated to take over the project and the school was placed in Risskov.

The first students started in 1968 in rented rooms as the school buildings had not yet been completed. In 1969 construction on the school was done and it was inaugurated in October, 1969. Between 1969 and 1980 the school had a Higher Preparatory Examination (HF) programme and between 1972 and 1990 the school offered supplementary courses within specific disciplines. In 2007 the school changed its name to Risskov Gymnasium (RiG), since the Danish counties had been disbanded in 2007.

== Notable graduates ==
- 1996: Morten Østergaard, leader of Radikale Venstre, Member of Parliament (MF), former Minister of Finance, former Minister of Internal Affairs.
- 2003: Stine Pilgaard, writer
