= Harald Salling-Mortensen =

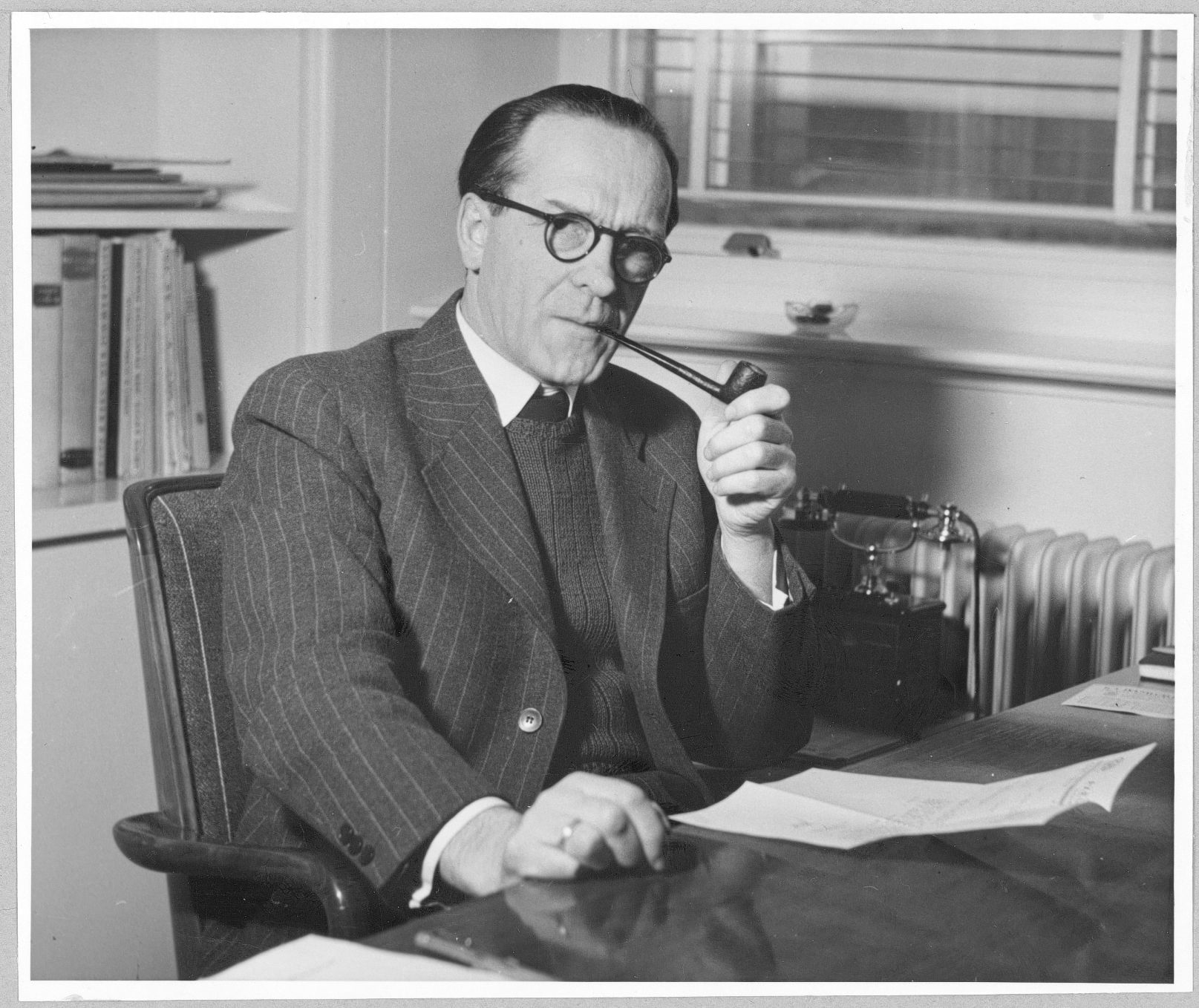
- Born: 7 July 1902; Esbjerg, Denmark
- Died: 15 September 1969 (aged 67); Aarhus, Denmark
- Education: Royal Danish Academy of Fine Arts
- Occupation: Architect
- Buildings: Børglum Hall

Harald Søren Salling-Mortensen (1902–1969) was a Danish architect who mainly worked in an around Aarhus in the first half of the 20th century. He designed several important buildings in the city and his style reflects the development of Danish architecture in his time, with plenty of Nordic functionalist characteristics.

== Background ==
Salling-Mortensen was born in Esbjerg on 6 July 1902 to train driver Morten Mortensen, later mayor of Esbjerg, and Augusta Elisabeth Salling. He was married to Christence Elisabeth Kjær on 26 December 1934 in Esbjerg and died on 15 October 1969 in Aarhus. He is interred at Vestre Cemetery.

Harald became a master carpenter in 1921, graduated from Odense Technical School in 1923 and studied architecture at the Royal Danish Academy of Fine Arts in Copenhagen 1925–26. He briefly found employment in Esbjerg before moving to Aarhus to work for the city architect in 1926–27. Harald established his own architecture design office in 1934 and cooperated with Aarhus architect Axel Høeg-Hansen from 1935 to 1940 whom he had previously worked for briefly in 1923–24. In 1940, Høeg-Hansen left Aarhus and Harald took over his architecture business. After his death, the architectural practice was bought by Falch og Larsen A/S and is now operating under the name aarhus arkitekterne a/s.

Harald was a member of the board of the Architects' Association of Denmark's department in Jutland from 1941–48.

== Works ==
Harald Salling-Mortensen designed some of the landmark structures in Aarhus, including Handelsbankens Hus, Børglum Kollegiet, and the former Main City Library in Mølleparken. He collaborated with several architects and designers, including Axel Høeg-Hansen and Alfred Mogensen. With Mogensen, he designed the two public schools of Møllevangskolen (1945–51) and Skovvangskolen (1933–37).

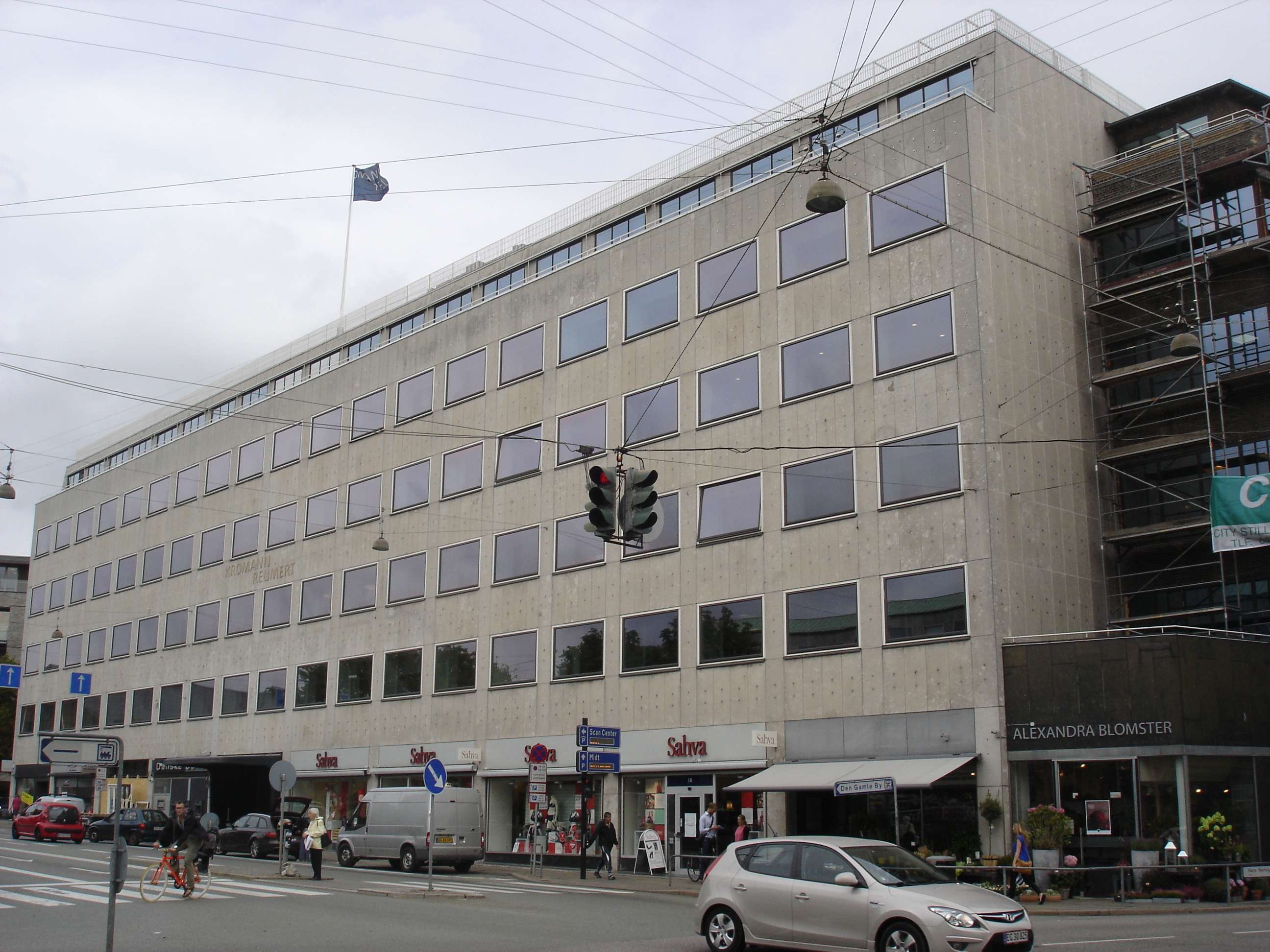
Handelsbankens Hus

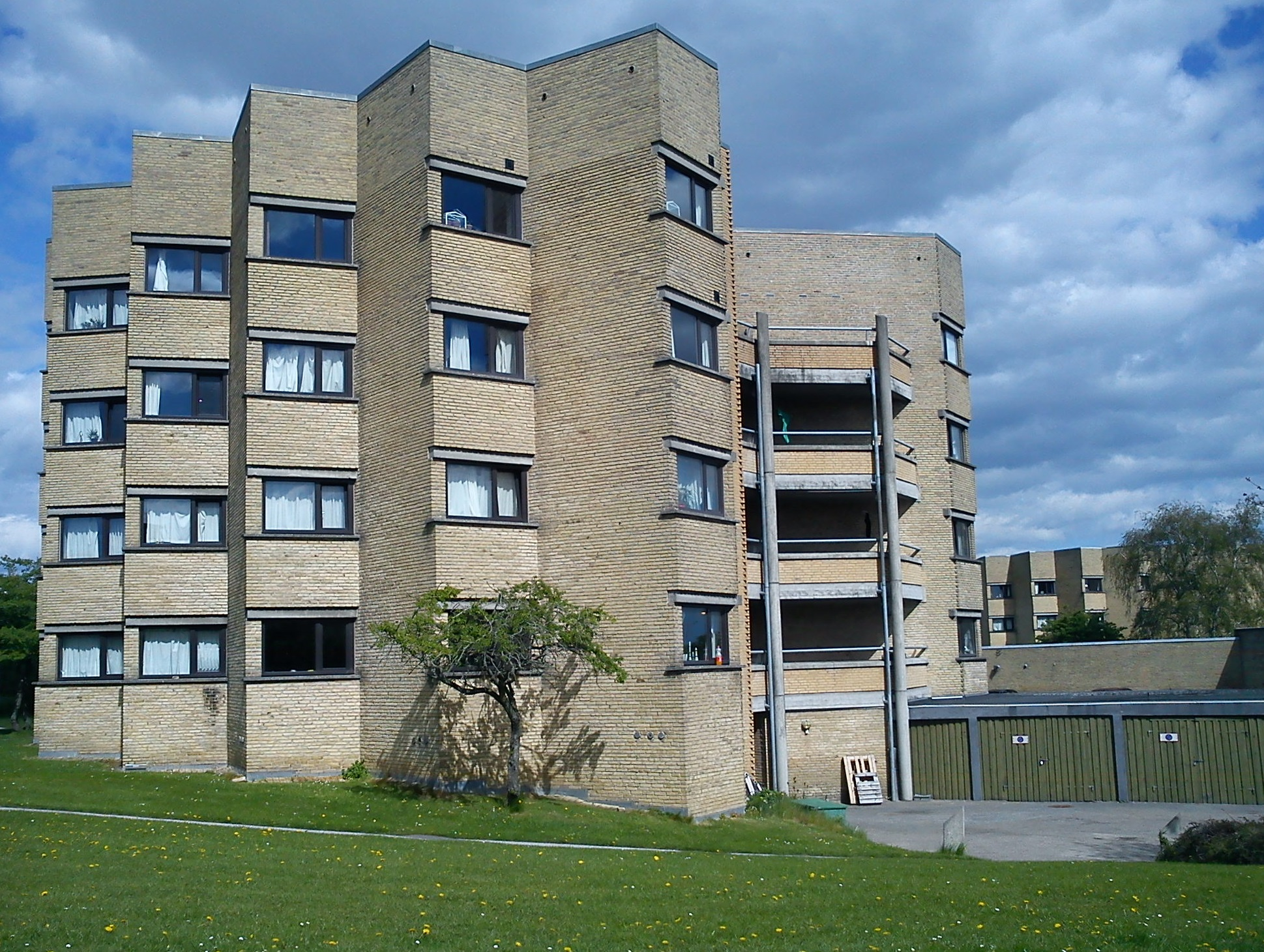
Børglum Hall

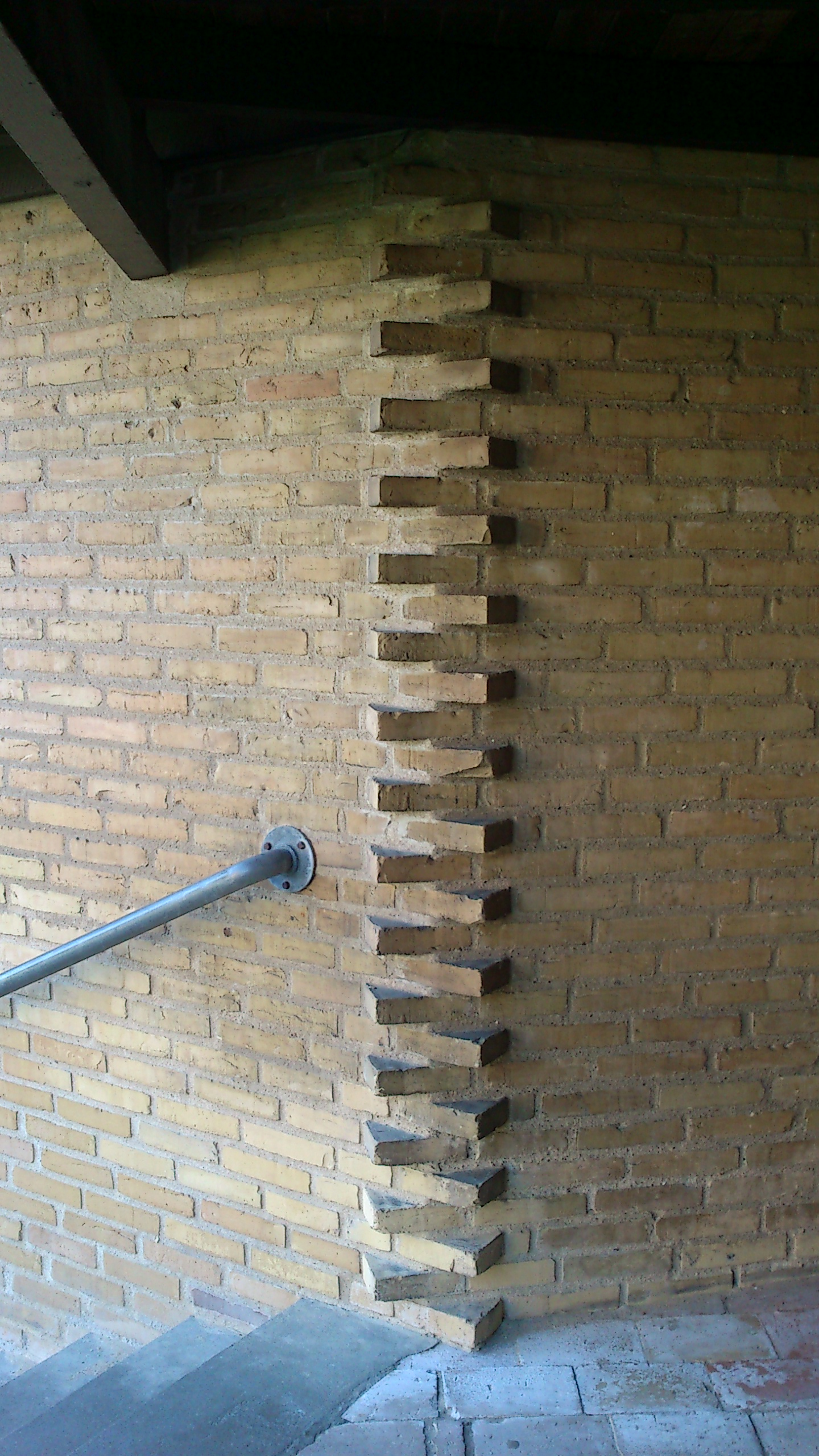
Brick-wall detail (Børglum Hall)

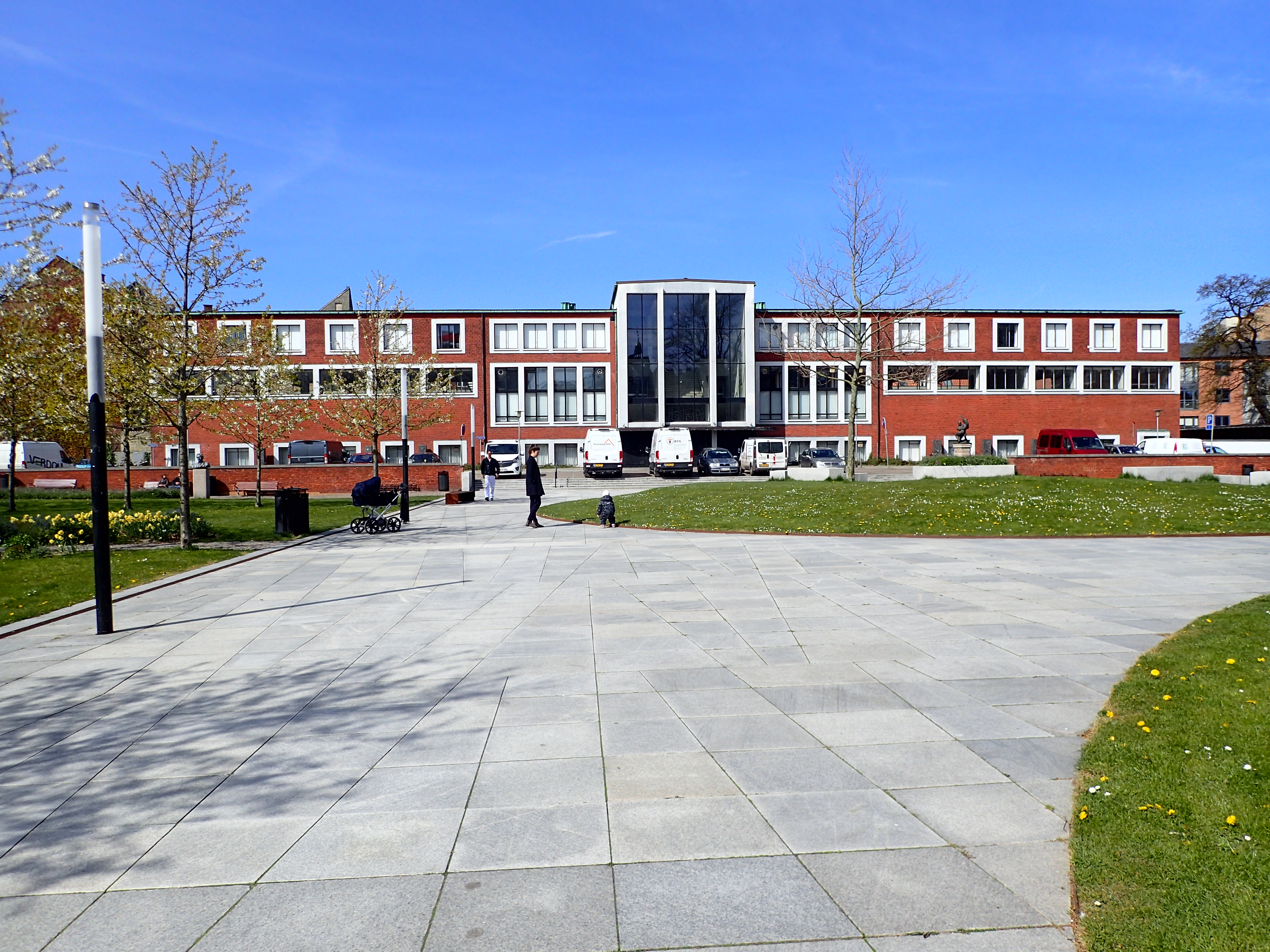
Former Main City Library

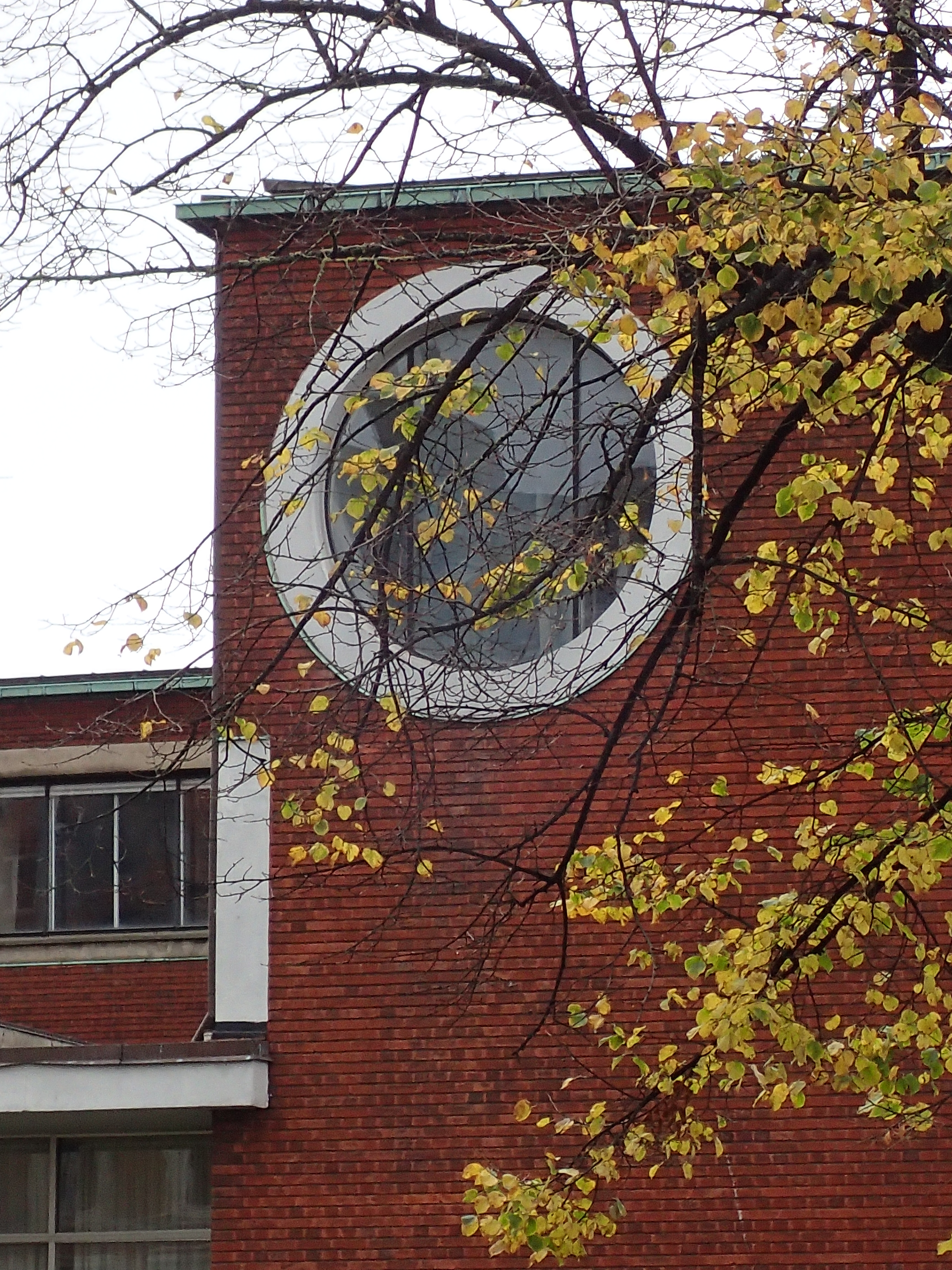
Round windows detail (former Main City Library)

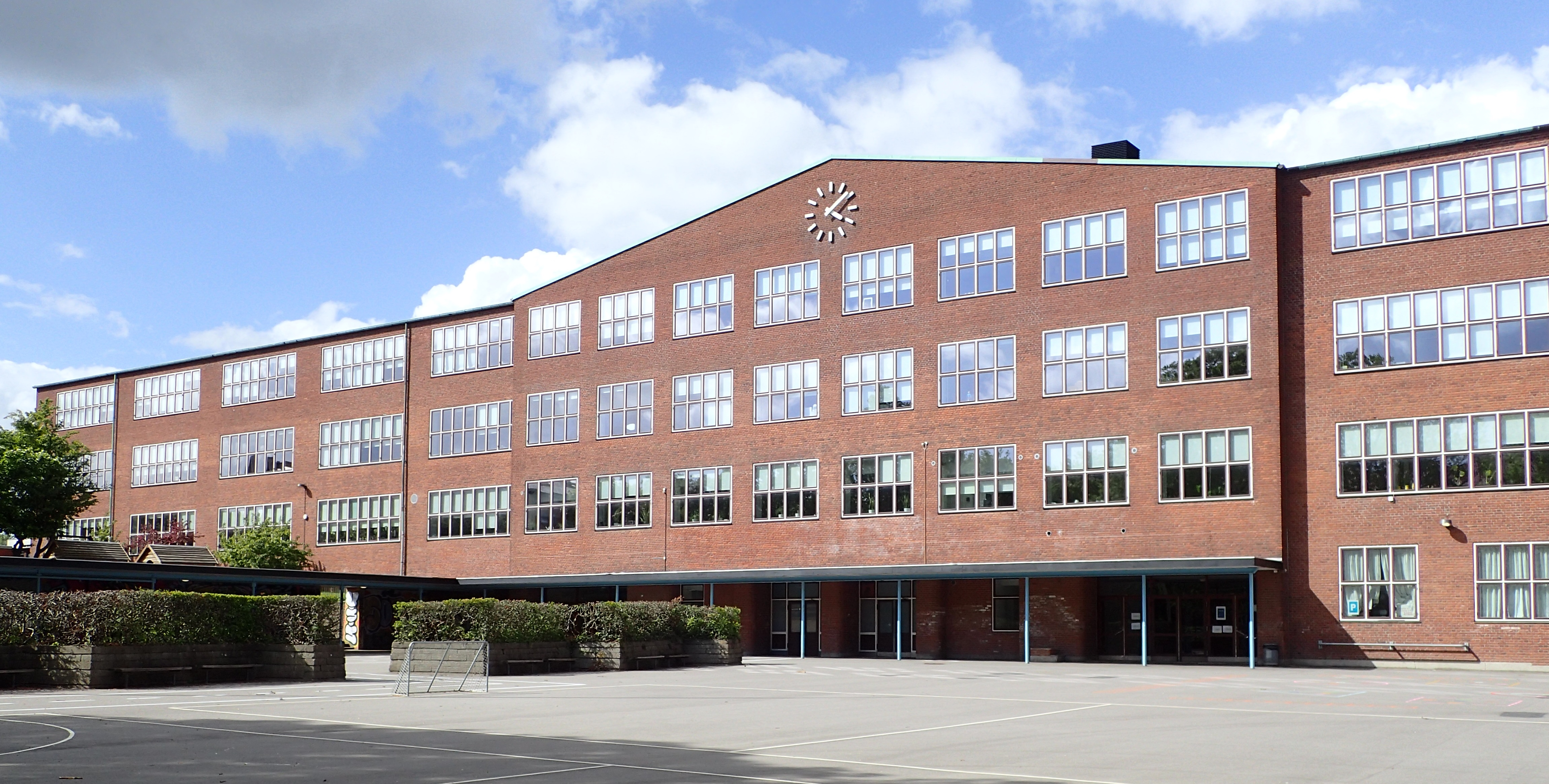
Skovvangskolen, public primary school
