= Alfred Mogensen =

- Born: 15 March 1900; Aarhus, Denmark
- Died: 1 April 1986 (aged 86); Aarhus, Denmark
- Education: Royal Danish Academy of Fine Arts
- Occupation: Architect
- Buildings: Skovvangskolen; Møllevangskolen; Vorrevangskolen
- Projects: Strandparken

Alfred Mogensen was a Danish architect and a City Architect of Aarhus.

== Biography ==
Alfred Mogensen was born Aarhus, Denmark. He was the son of Asmus Marius Fisker and Petra Louise Jacobsen. He was educated as a carpenter at Aarhus Technical School. He attended the Royal Danish Academy of Fine Arts Architecture School from 1909. He worked as a carpenter between 1916 and 1920. He found employment in various architect firms in Aarhus and Copenhagen and worked as the building inspector for Kaj Gottlob during the construction of St. Luke's Church between 1921 and 1926. In 1925 he was hired by the City Architects office in the Aarhus Municipality administration where he worked until 1943 when was appointed to the position of City Architect, a position he held until 1968.

Alfred Mogensen left a distinct mark on the city of Aarhus. His most well-known works are the former Main City Library in Mølleparken, a project he won in a contest along with Harald Salling-Mortensen, and Strandparken, a residential apartment complex built in 1935–38. Strandparken is an early example of an apartment complex with free-standing blocks separated by green open spaces and inspired the later and very similar Blidahpark in Charlottenlund.

Alfred Mogensen worked on the forefront of modern school architecture and designed three public elementary schools. Skovvangskolen from 1933 to 1937, Møllevangskolen from 1945 to 1951 and Vorrevangskolen from 1953 to 1960. Skovvangskolen and Møllevangskolen was jointly designed with Harald Salling-Mortensen. Møllevangsskolen is the first time in Danish school architecture when class rooms were designed with dual external light sources. The design called for a sloping ceiling that rise towards the back of the classroom where large ceiling windows illuminated with skylights. Vorrevangsskolen also exemplified modern school architecture in the overall shape of the school with many perpendicular wings and small courtyards in between.

== Galleri ==
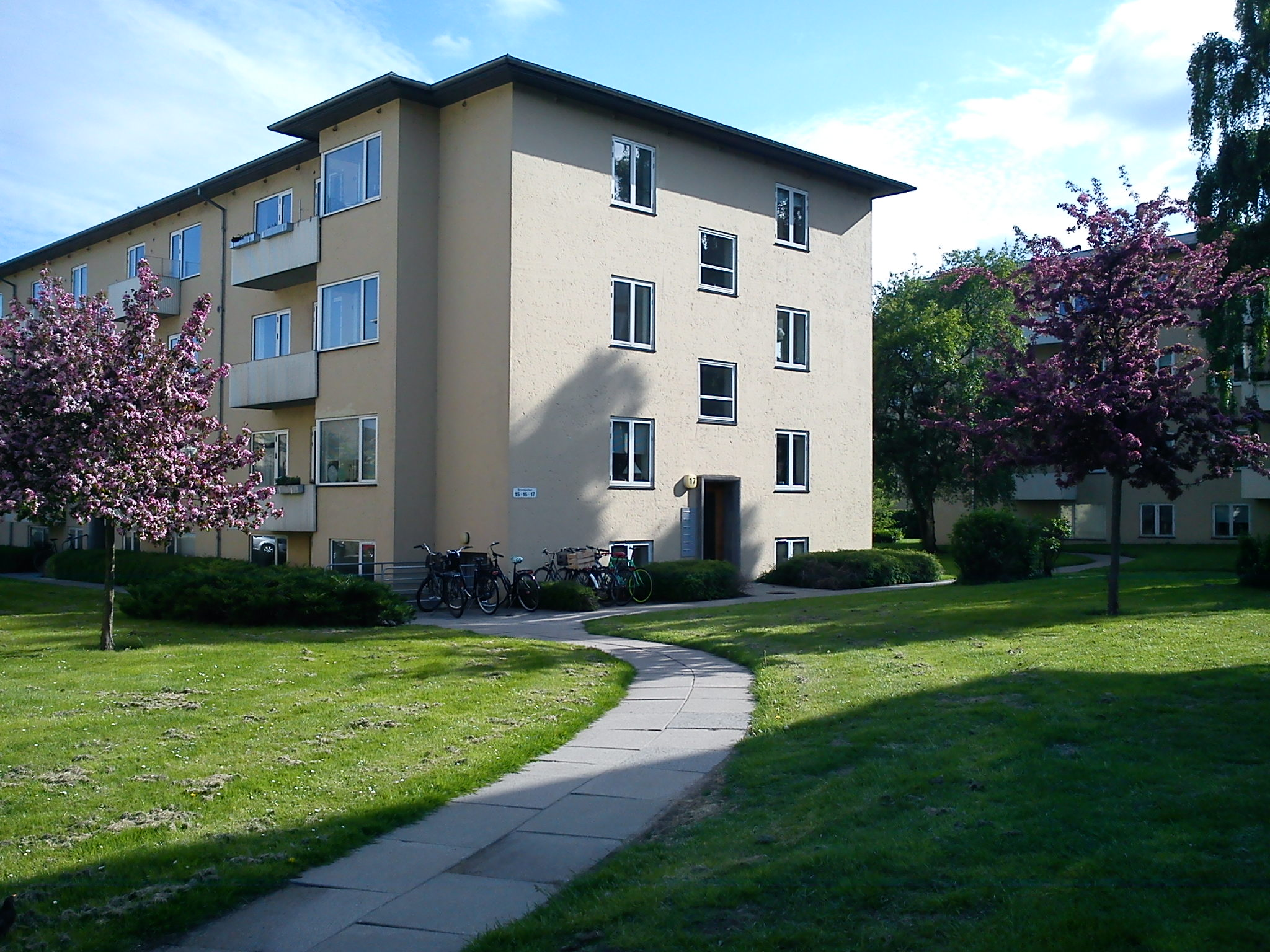
Strandparken

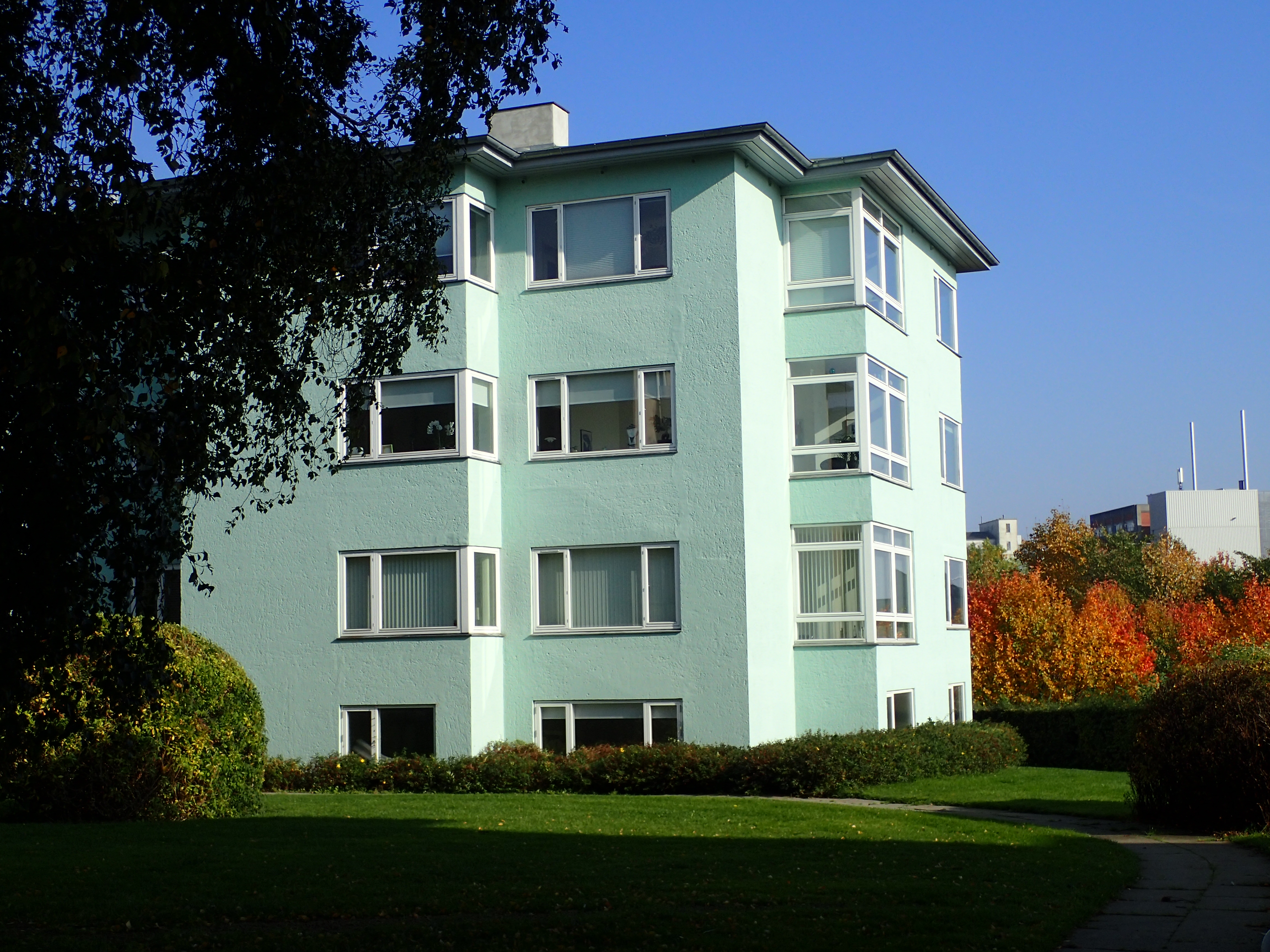
Strandparken

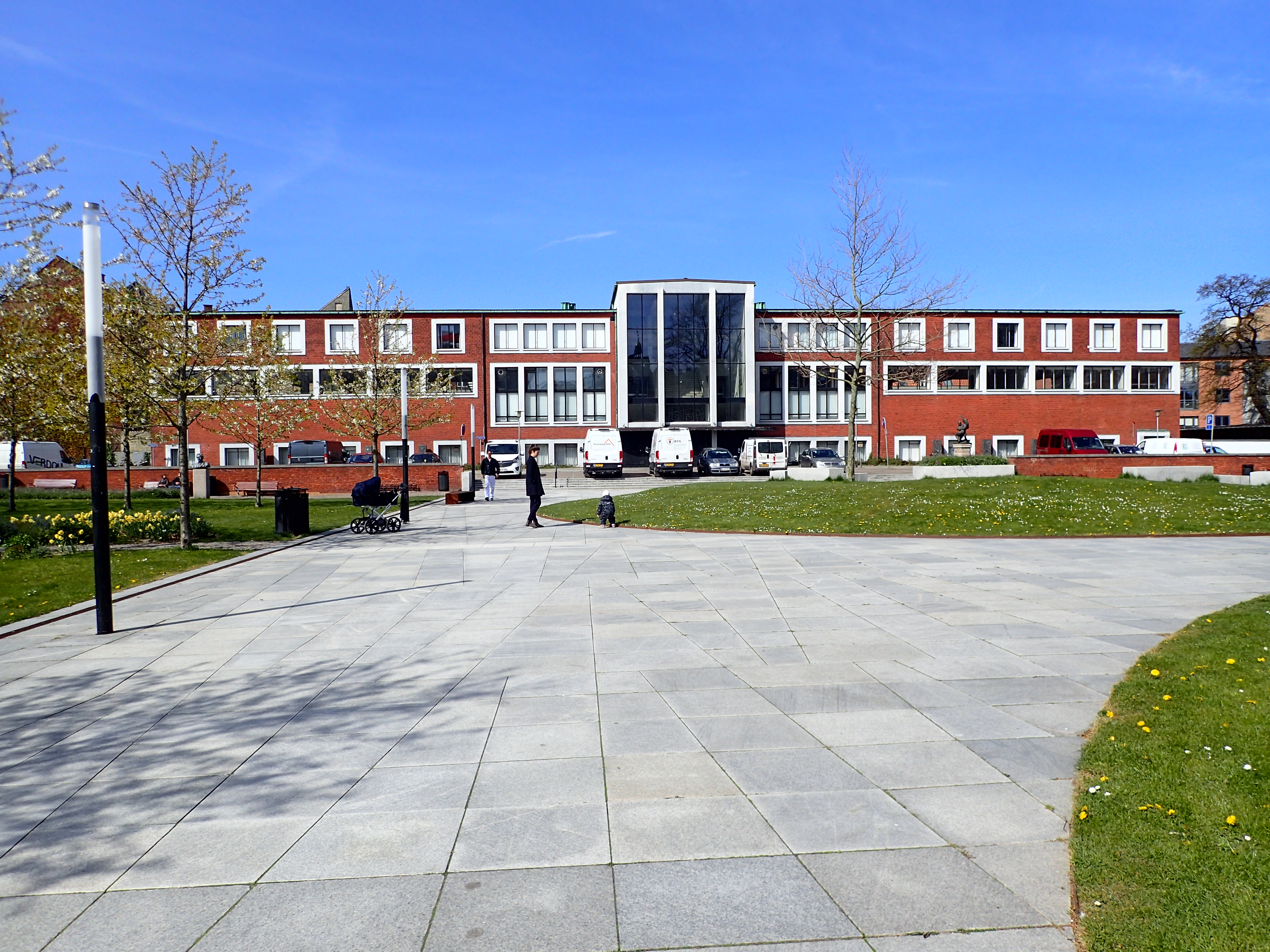
Main City Library building (Mølleparken)

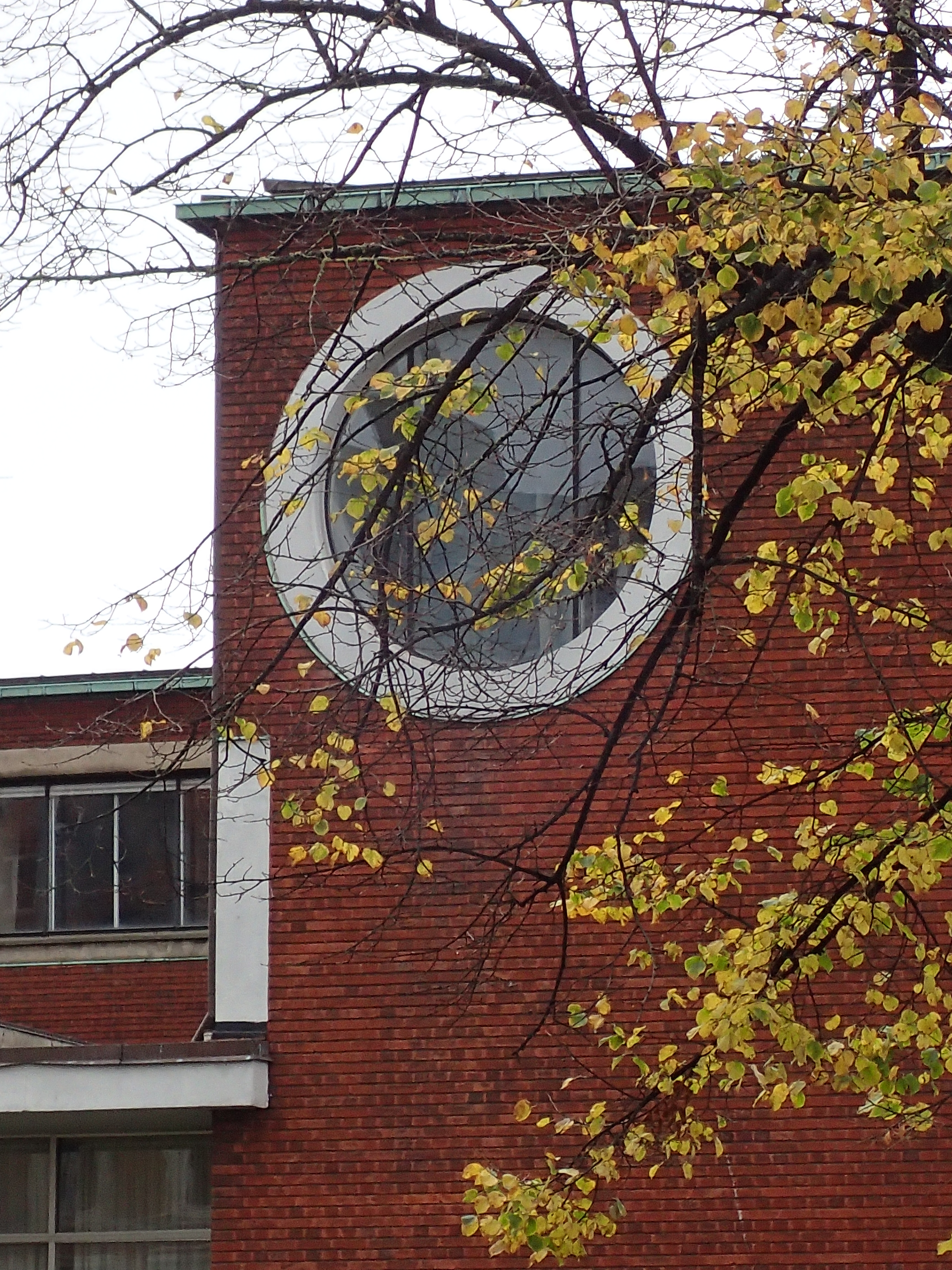
Round window detail (Main City Library)

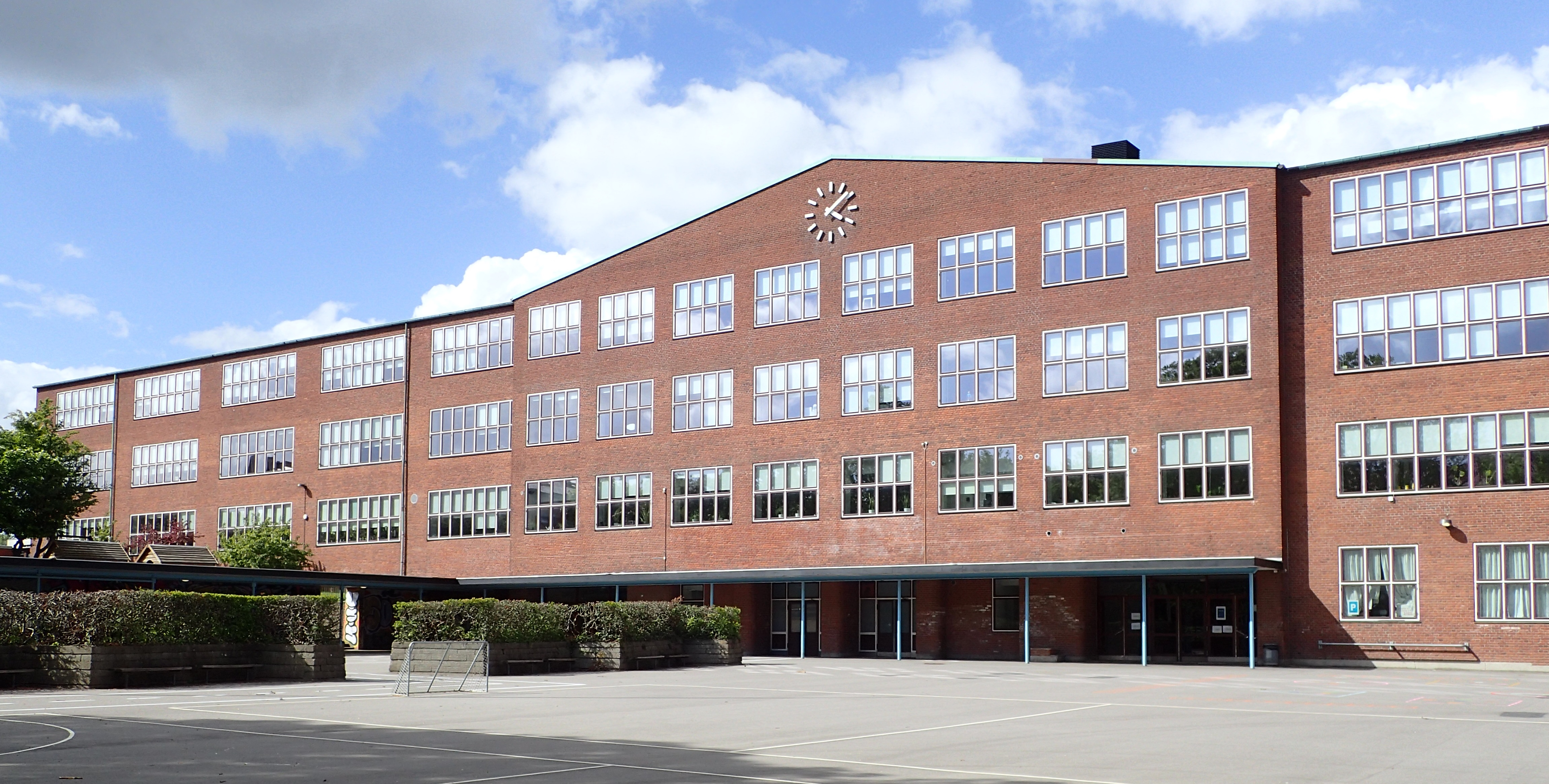
Skovvangskolen

== External references ==
- Alfred Mogensen on Wikimedia commons
