= Else Marie Pade =

Danish composer (1924–2016)

- Born: 2 December 1924; Aarhus, Denmark
- Died: 18 January 2016 (aged 91); Gentofte, Denmark
- Occupations: Composer, musician
- Years active: 1952–2016

Else Marie Pade (2 December 1924 – 18 January 2016) was a Danish composer of electronic music. She was educated as a pianist at the Kongelige Danske Musikkonservatorium (Royal Danish Academy of Music) in Copenhagen. She studied composition first with Vagn Holmboe, and later with Jan Maegaard, from whom she learned twelve-tone technique. In 1954, she became the first Danish composer of electronic and concrete music. She worked with Pierre Schaeffer and Karlheinz Stockhausen, as well as Pierre Boulez.

Pade was active in the resistance during the Second World War, and was interned at the Frøslev prison camp from 1944 until the end of the war.

== Early life ==
Pade was born in Aarhus. In her childhood, she was often bedridden with pyelonephritis. She listened to the outside world and created "aural pictures" out of the sounds. These sounds, real sounds, became the basis of her actual musical works. As a protected child, she came with her mother outside of town and went to the theatre. The first music lessons took place in the home where the mother tried to teach her piano playing, but when she did not bother practising scales, she got her mother's piano teacher, Miss Moller. Later she had music lessons at the People's Music School in Aarhus, where the director, Edoard Müller, a music agent in N. Kochs School, had witnessed Pade's talent and offered her music education at the People's Music School. Pade replied that they could not afford it, and then Müller called the parents and established a system. Else gained insight into jazz thanks to the People's Music School. She borrowed a portable gramophone from a friend and heard New Orleans jazz. When she was about 16 she began playing in a jazz band, "The Blue Star Band", which played at school dances and associations. Pade later took piano lessons with Karin Brieg.

It was through Brieg that she came into the Danish Resistance. One day Else spat at a column of German soldiers who marched in Aarhus' city center. A soldier stepped out of line and ran after her, but Else knew the city and escaped, taking the tram to Brieg who lived in Klintegården. Brieg said that if she were to resist, she had to join the Resistance, and so Pade joined a women's group with her.

== Resistance and imprisonment ==
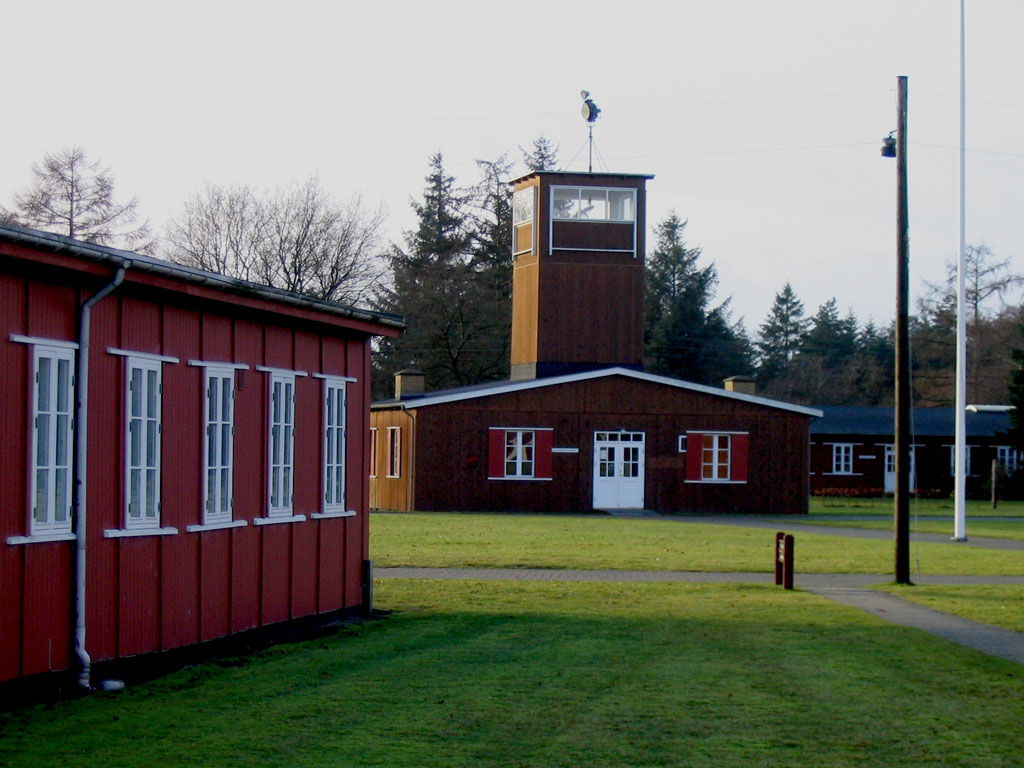
Central watchtower at Frøslevlejren

Pade began by distributing illegal newspapers after 20 August 1943, and in 1944 she received training in the use of weapons and explosives. She joined an all-female explosives group aimed at identifying the telephone cables in Aarhus with resistance organiser Hedda Lundh. The idea of this survey was that the wires would be blown up when the British invasion came, so the Germans could not use the telephone network. However the plan was cancelled when the Normandy landings took place.

On 13 September 1944, Pade was arrested by the Gestapo. Through a prison window she saw a star flash and heard music coming from inside herself. Next morning she scratched the tune into the cell wall with a buckle from her girdle. It was the song "You and I and the Stars" ("Du og jeg og stjernerne"). She was sent to Frøslevlejren, where she began composing, and decided to train in music. In Frøslevlejren the prisoners held song evenings to keep their spirits up. The songs included Pade's songs and other songs arranged by Karin Brieg. These works were released on CD on the occasion of the 60th anniversary of the liberation: Songs in the Darkness: Music Frøslevlejren 1944–45.

== Composing ==
After the war, she read at the Conservatory of Music, first as a pianist, but because of the after-effects of her stay in Frøslevlejren she could not do this and trained instead as a composer. In 1952 she heard a Danmarks Radio programme on Musique concrète and its creator Pierre Schaeffer. It reminded her of her own childhood conception of sounds and timbres. Via family in France, she contacted the French radio RTF and Schaeffer. She got the chance to see studies on RTF and Pierre Schaeffer had his workshop and got an appointment to get sent home material. In the same year she read Schaeffer's book À la Recherche d'une musique concrete (On the trail of concrete music).

=== A Day at Dyrehavsbakken ===
This, inspired by Pierre Schaeffer, became Denmark's first concrete and electronic music work: A Day at Dyrehavsbakken. After having posted a synopsis for DR, as Jens Frederik Lawaetz read, she agreed to make background music for a TV show for the new Danish television. The background music was Denmark's first practical musical work created by many recordings from Bakken, in which she was assisted by technicians from DR.

=== Symphonie magnétophonique ===
The work is musique concrète describing everyday life in a day in Copenhagen: morning dawning with its routines, the way to work, time in the office or the factory, then the trip home from school or work to domestic routines in the evening, and finally the day is ending and a new one can begin.

=== Seven Circles ===
This was composed after visit to the planetarium at Expo 58 in Brussels. The composition shows the night sky with the stars and their movement relative to each other. The work is based on Ligeti's principles of sound colours, Boulez's serialism and Stockhausen's mathematically organized score.

=== Darmstadt School ===
Her interest in the new music caused her and many other composers to travel to Darmstadt and follow Stockhausen, Ligeti and Boulez's courses at the Darmstädter Ferienkurse. Pade participated in 1962, 1964, 1968, and 1972. Stockhausen has used her Glass Bead Game as an example when he lectured on electronic music.

=== Grass blade ===
Nini Theilade and Pade became friends after meeting at El Forman's apartment, where many art-interested people gathered. Together they did a TV ballet, Grass Blade, based on a poem by El Forman, with choreography by Theilade.

== See also ==
- List of Danish composers
