= Nørre Stenbro =

- Neighborhood
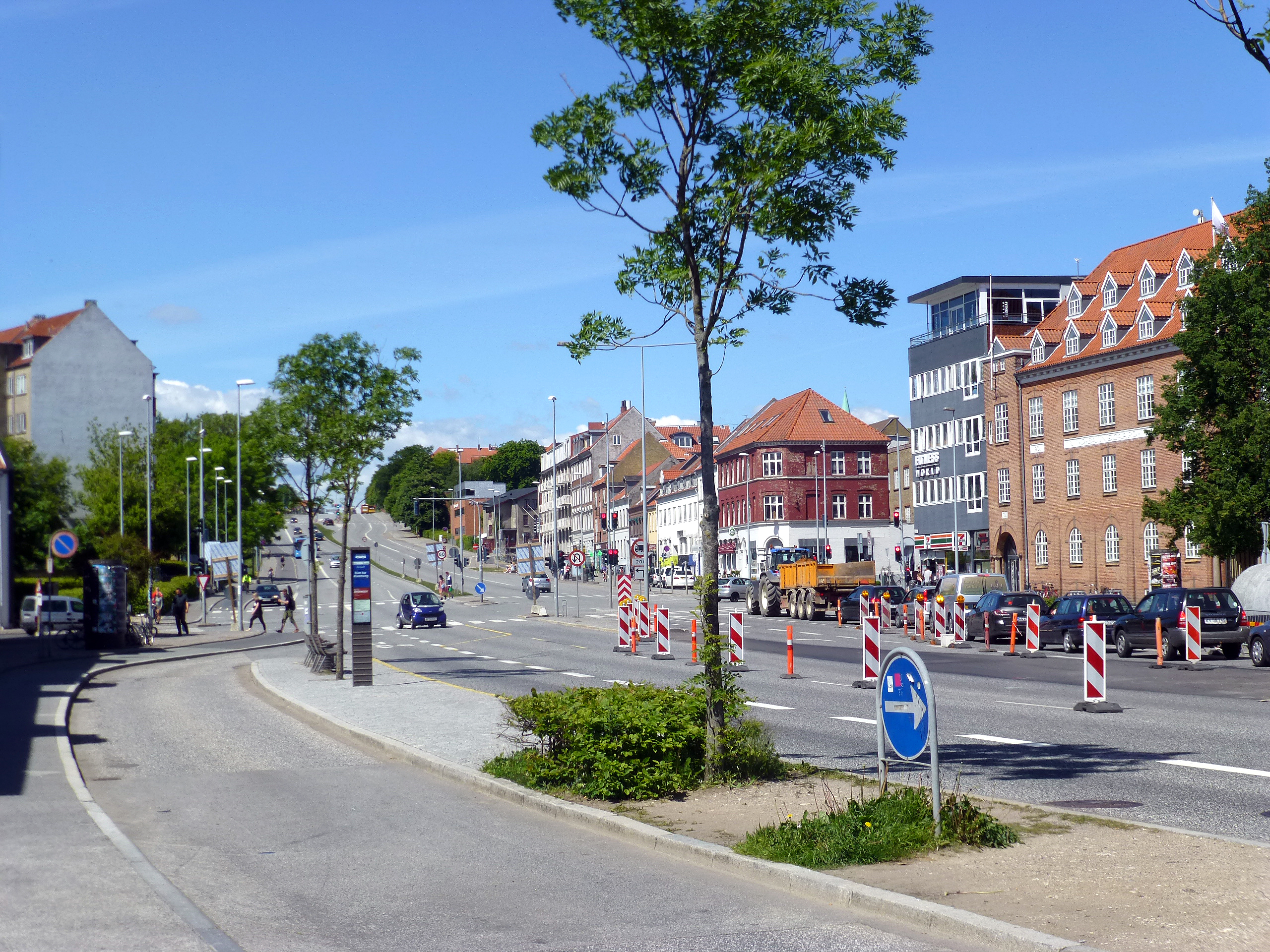
- Nørreport in Nørre Stenbro

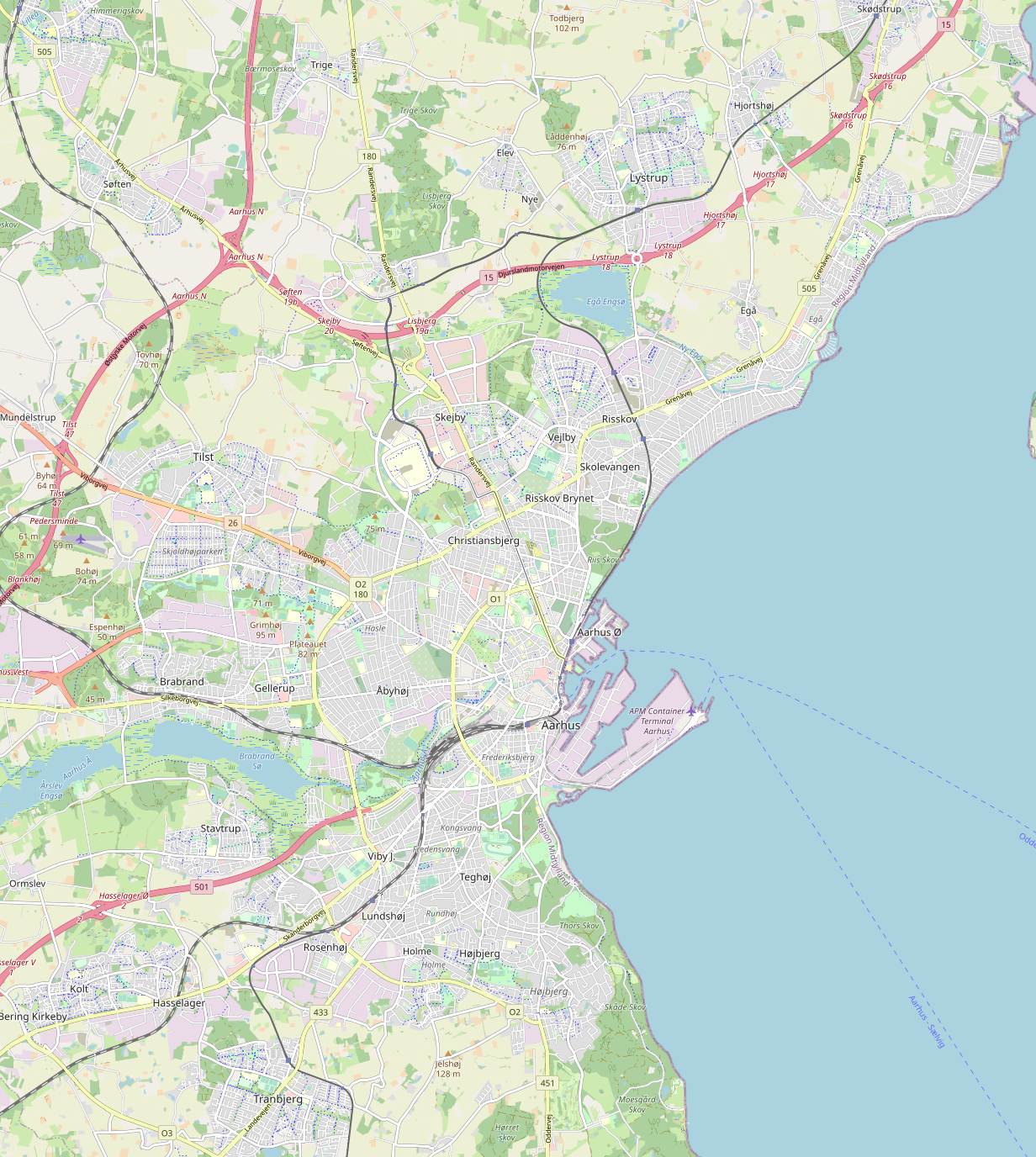
- Location within Aarhus
- Coordinates: 56.1628°N 10.2131°E
- Country: Kingdom of Denmark
- Regions of Denmark: Central Denmark Region
- Municipality: Aarhus Municipality
- District: Aarhus C
- Postal code: 8000

Nørre Stenbro is a small neighborhood in the city of Aarhus, Denmark home to some 3,000 residents. The neighborhood is part of the Aarhus C district and borders the neighborhoods of Indre By south and west, Aarhus Docklands in the east and Trøjborg north. The residential area of Nørre Stenbro is delimited by the streets Nørre Boulevard, Østboulevarden, Østbanetorvet, Kystvejen, Nørreport and Nørrebrogade, but the large Nordre Cemetery and the smaller residential quarter of Skovvejskvarteret is also part of the same registration.

The School of Architecture and the train station Østbanetorvet station, part of Aarhus light rail line, are both located at Nørre Stenbro.

== The name ==
The name Nørre Stenbro is a recent invention from 1971 when the local residents organization was established and adopted it. The name is believed to be a reference to the colloquial term "Stentoften" previously used to reference the area beyond Nørreport.

== History ==
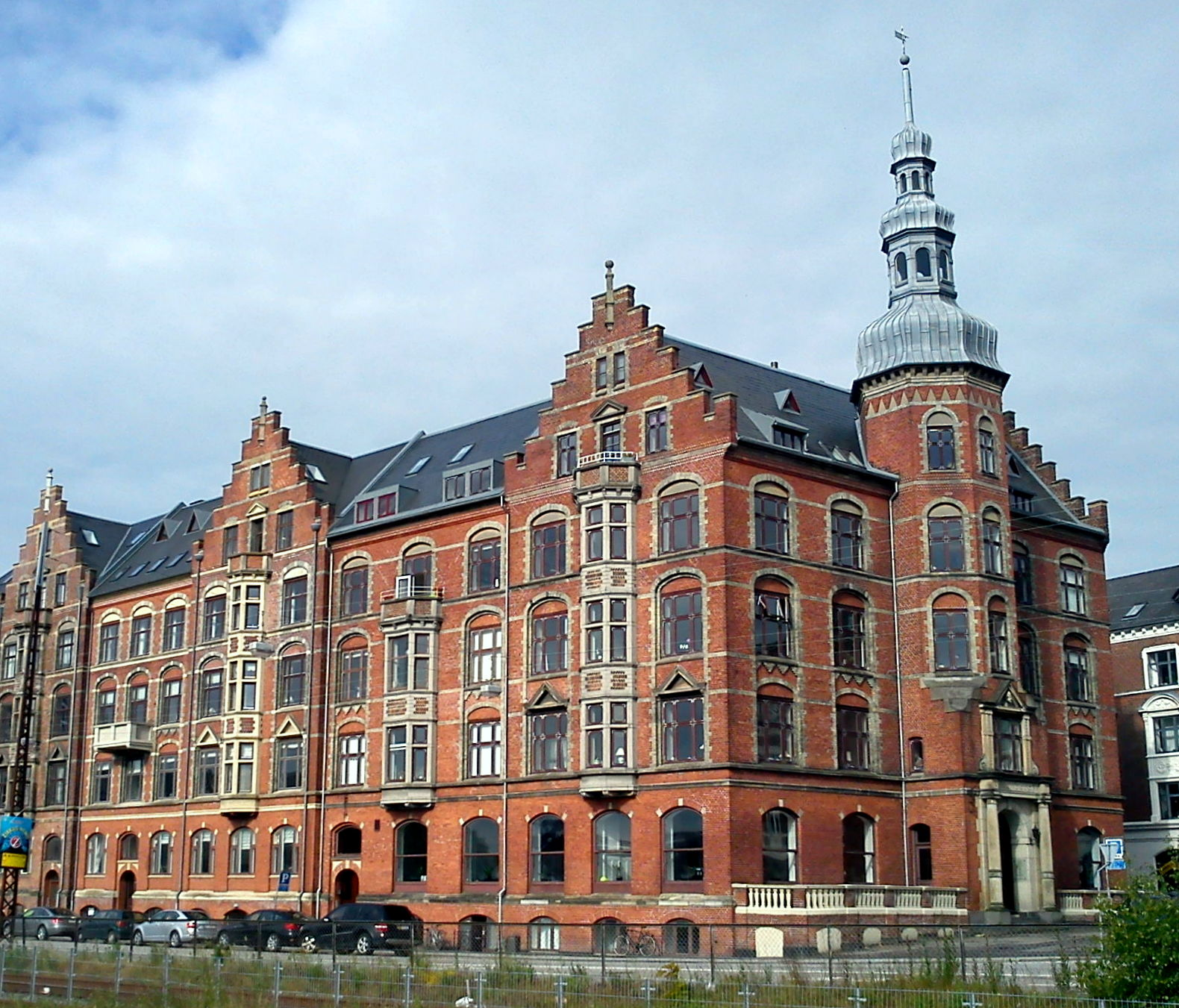
Mejlborg, an apartment complex built in 1896-98.

Nørre Stenbro is located at the inner northern edge of the 1850s Aarhus city limits. Aarhus was at the time walled as octroi was in effect and taxes were collected on products brought to market. In 1851 the tax was abolished in Denmark and the walls were no longer necessary and could be removed. Until then Mejlgade had a city gate where it now intersects Molsgade making it one of the main thoroughfares into Aarhus; home to taverns and medieval merchant mansions catering to travellers and traders. The listed School of Architecture building (Raas Gaard) is one of the few remaining such mansions.

The city walls coming down coincided with the Industrial Revolution and strong population growth. Between 1870 and 1900 Aarhus grew from 15.000 to 50.000 inhabitants and several new neighborhoods were developed. In 1896 the open lands formerly outside and north of the walls were developed into Trøjborg but since the area of Nørre Stenbro was already settled and parcelled, it developed more organically over time into a small, dense working-class neighborhood. The architecture is distinct from the larger planned neighborhoods in Vesterbro and Trøjborg; the streets are narrower and buildings of different styles, colors and heights mix.

Nørre Stenbro developed as a working-class neighborhood in the late 19th through early 20th centuries. There are two listed buildings in the neighborhood; the medieval mansion Raas Gaard and the functionalist apartment complex Klintegaarden. Nørre Stenbro went through a redevelopment phase in the 1970s; housing density was reduced and apartments were changed to condominiums and sold off. Today the neighborhood is mixed residential and commercial.

== Gallery ==
Nørre Stenbro

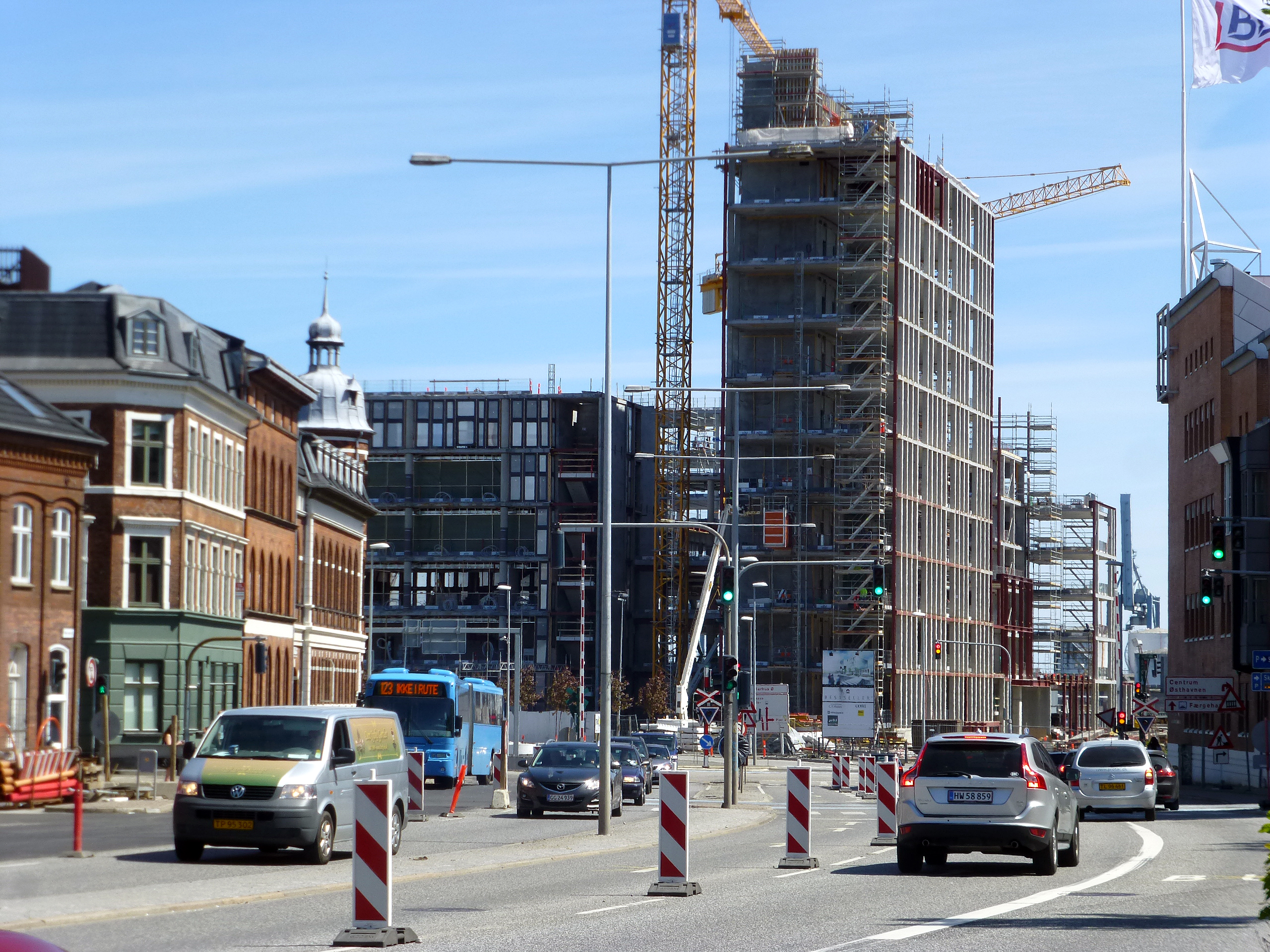
Nørreport, a major traffic gate to the Port of Aarhus and the new developing neighbourhood of Aarhus Docklands.

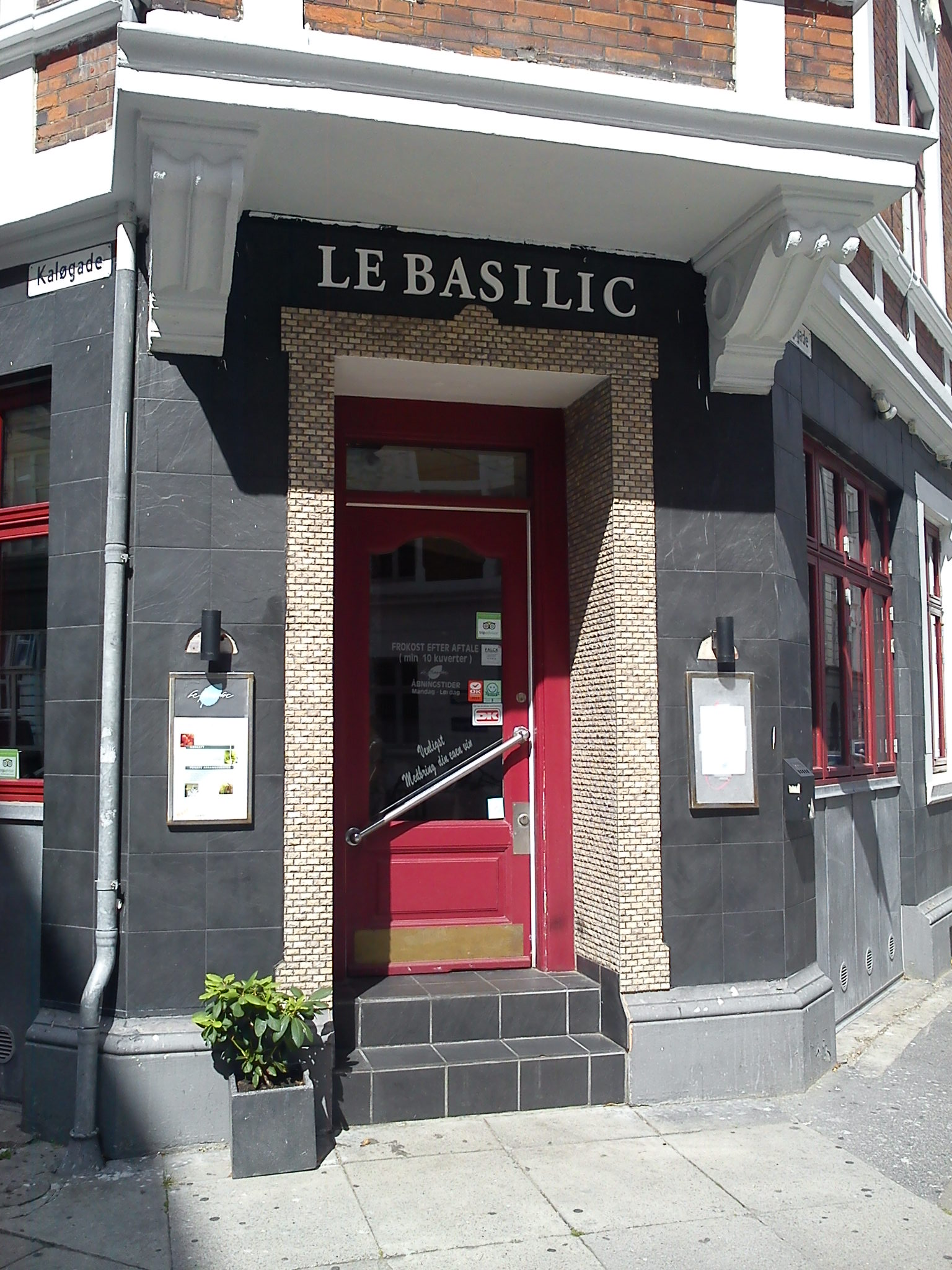
Le Basilic, one of many restaurants in the long street of Mejlgade.

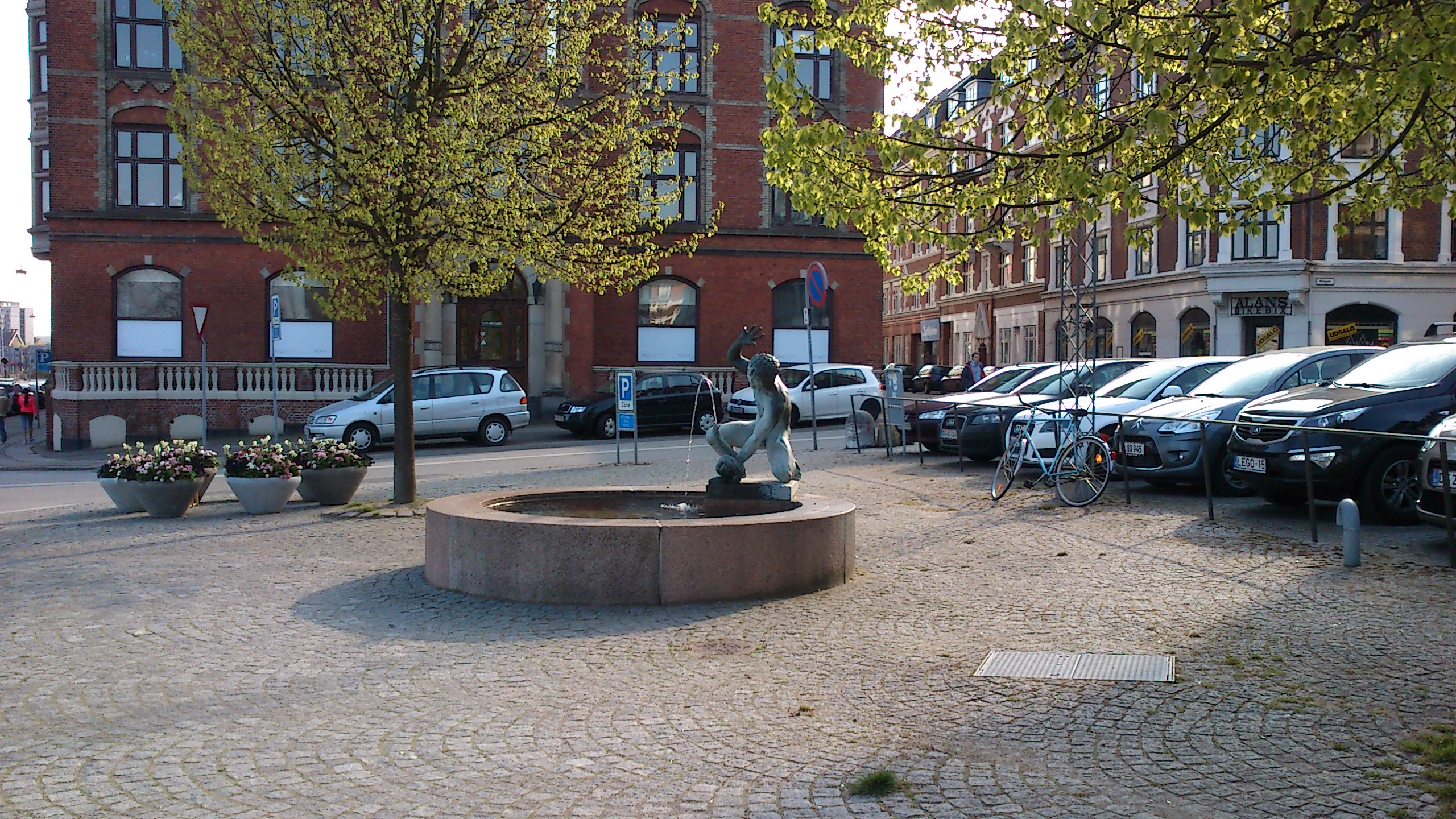
Mejlborg Torvet, a small cobbled square including the bronze fountain of Ålefangeren (The Eel-catcher).

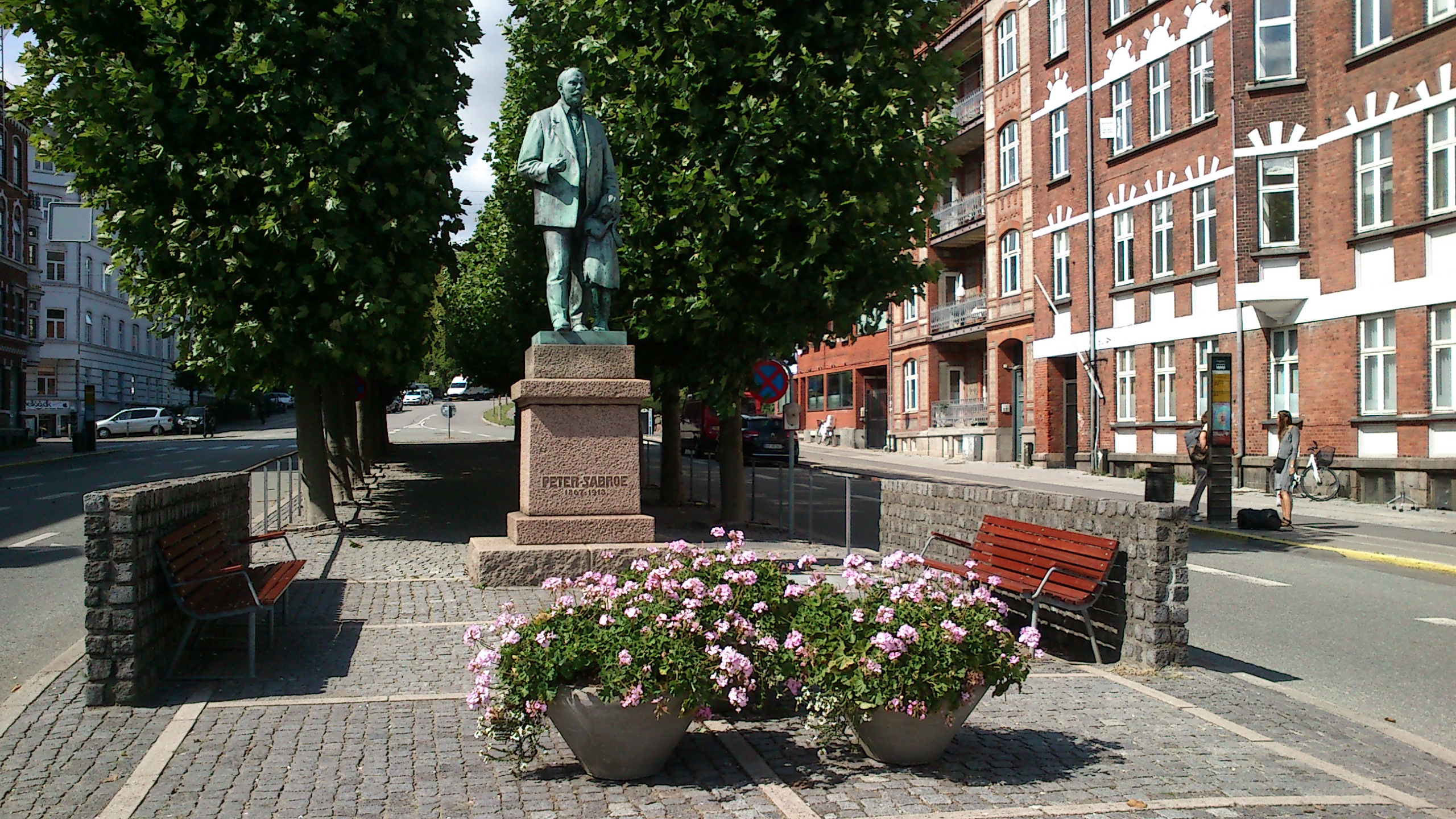
Østbanetorvet, a small square and transport hub.

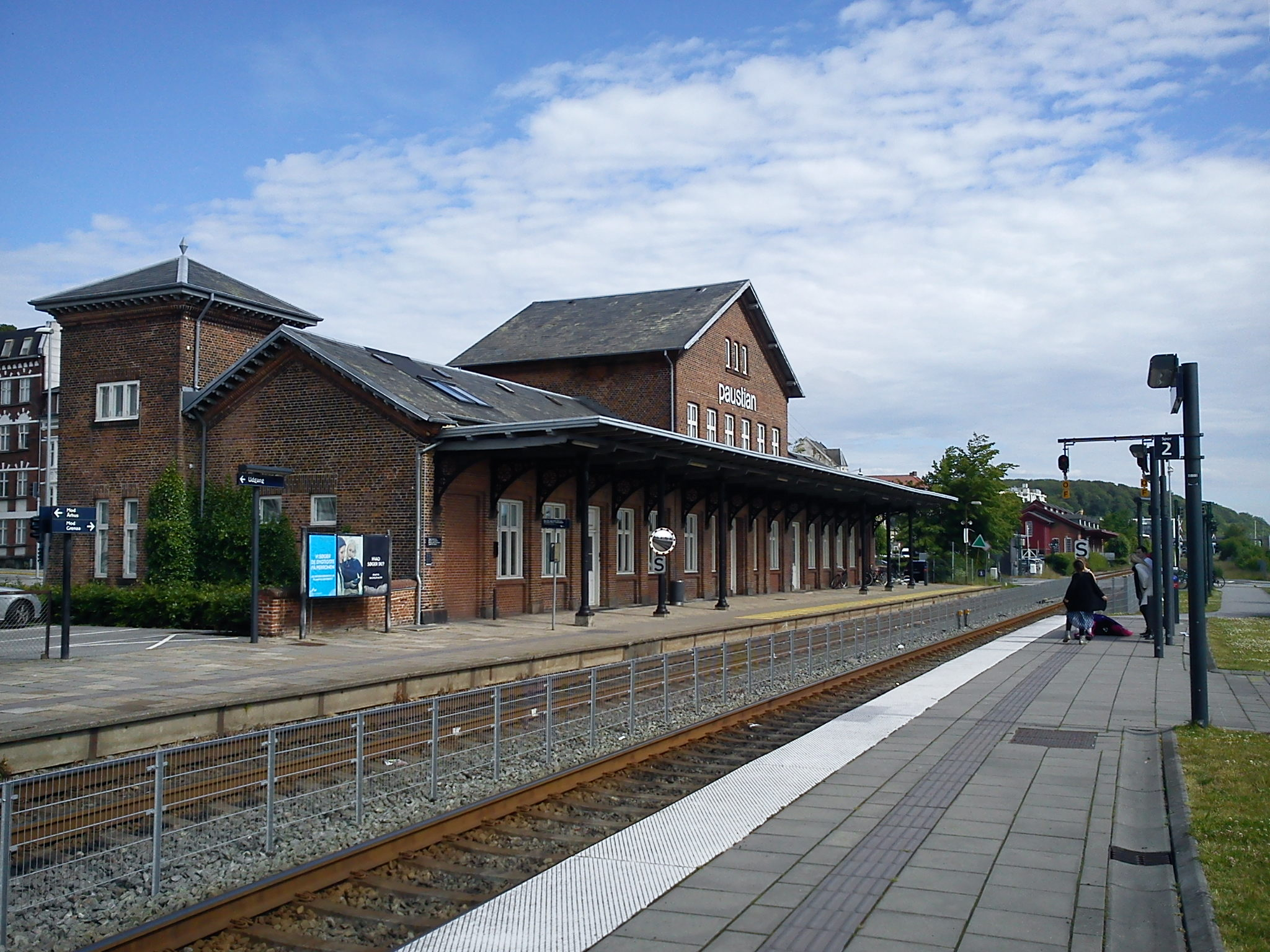
Østbanetorvet Station, a local train station at Østbanetorvet.

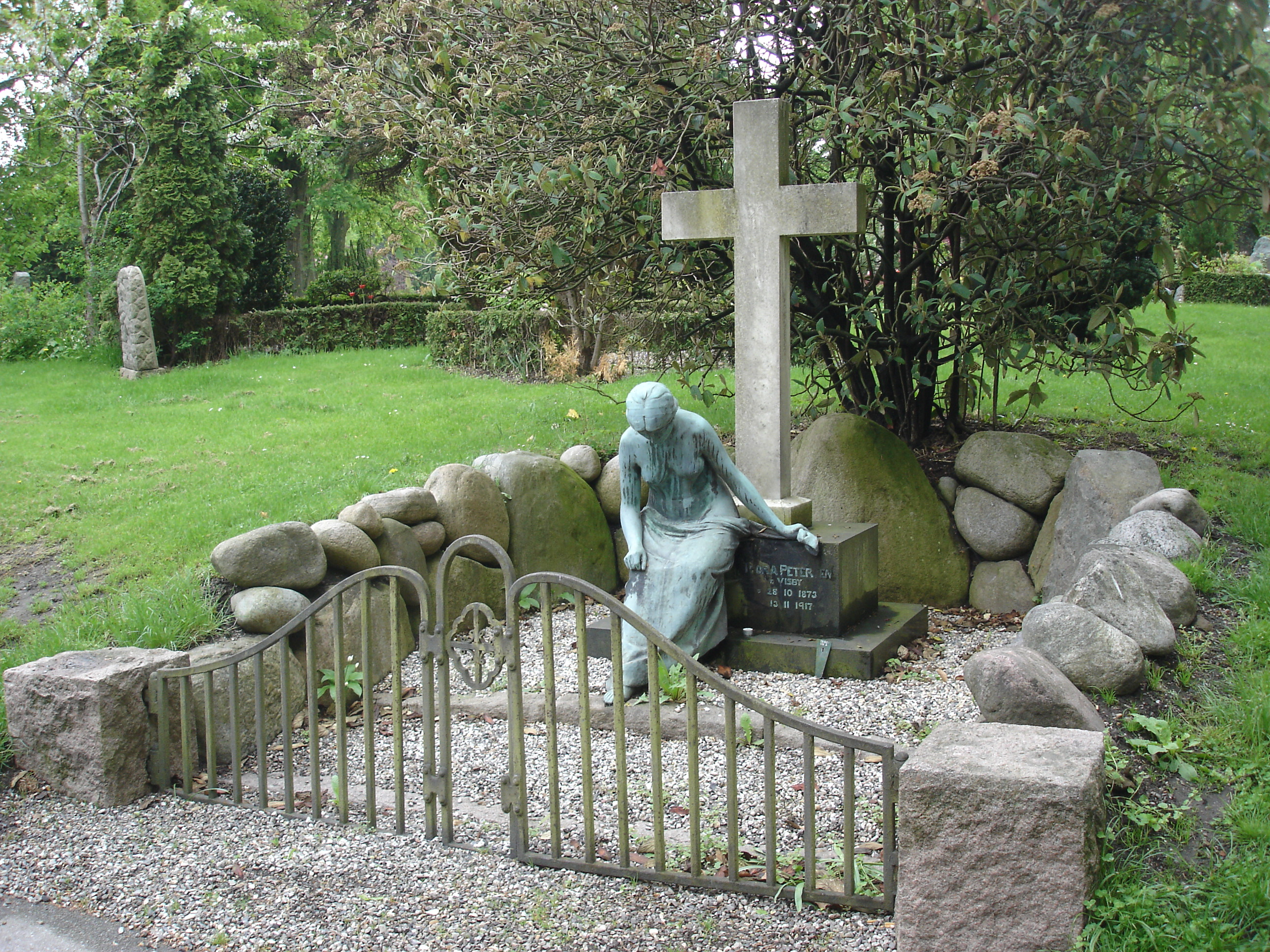
One of many extravagant grave monuments on the large Nordre Cemetery.

Skovvejskvarteret

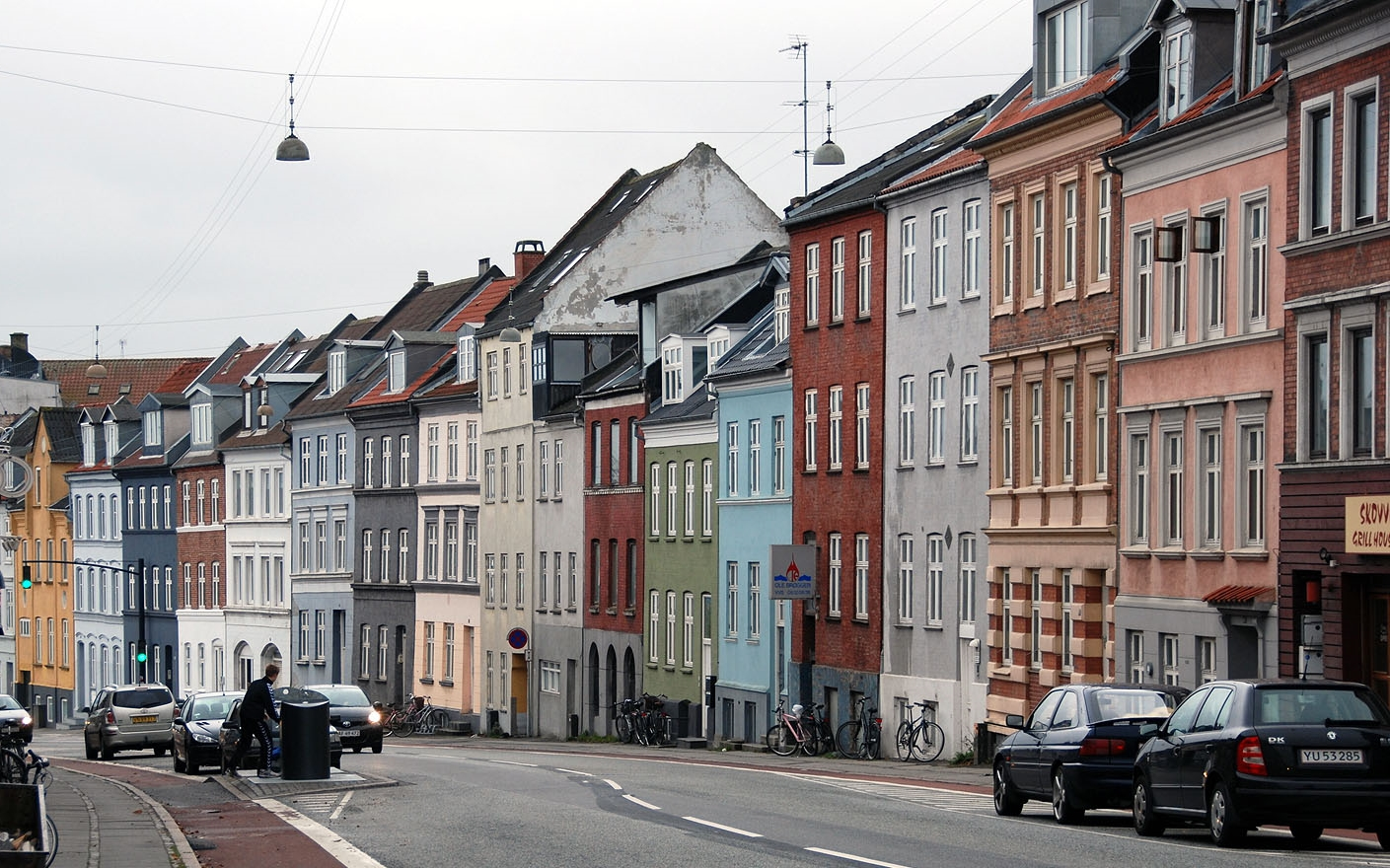
The street of Skovvejen and the surrounding quarter of Skovvejskvarteret also forms part of the registration.

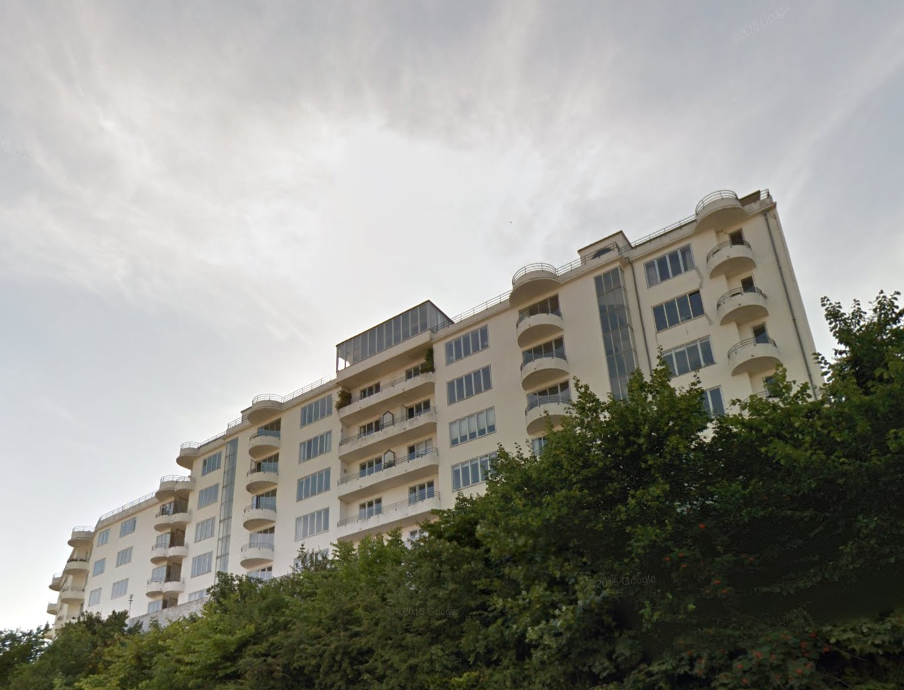
Klintegaarden, a modernist apartment complex overlooking the Bay of Aarhus (built in 1935).

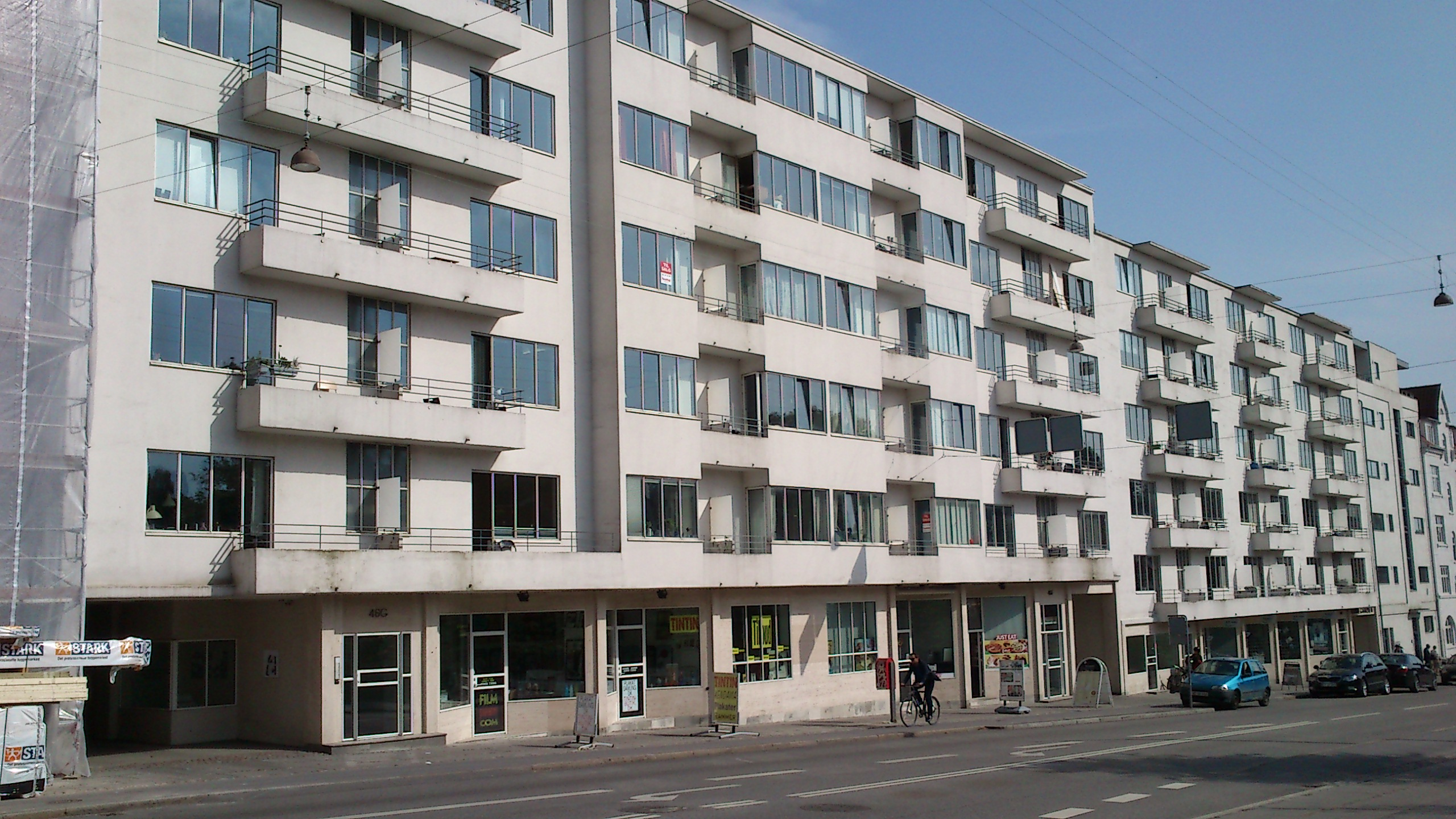
The roadside facade of Klintegaarden.

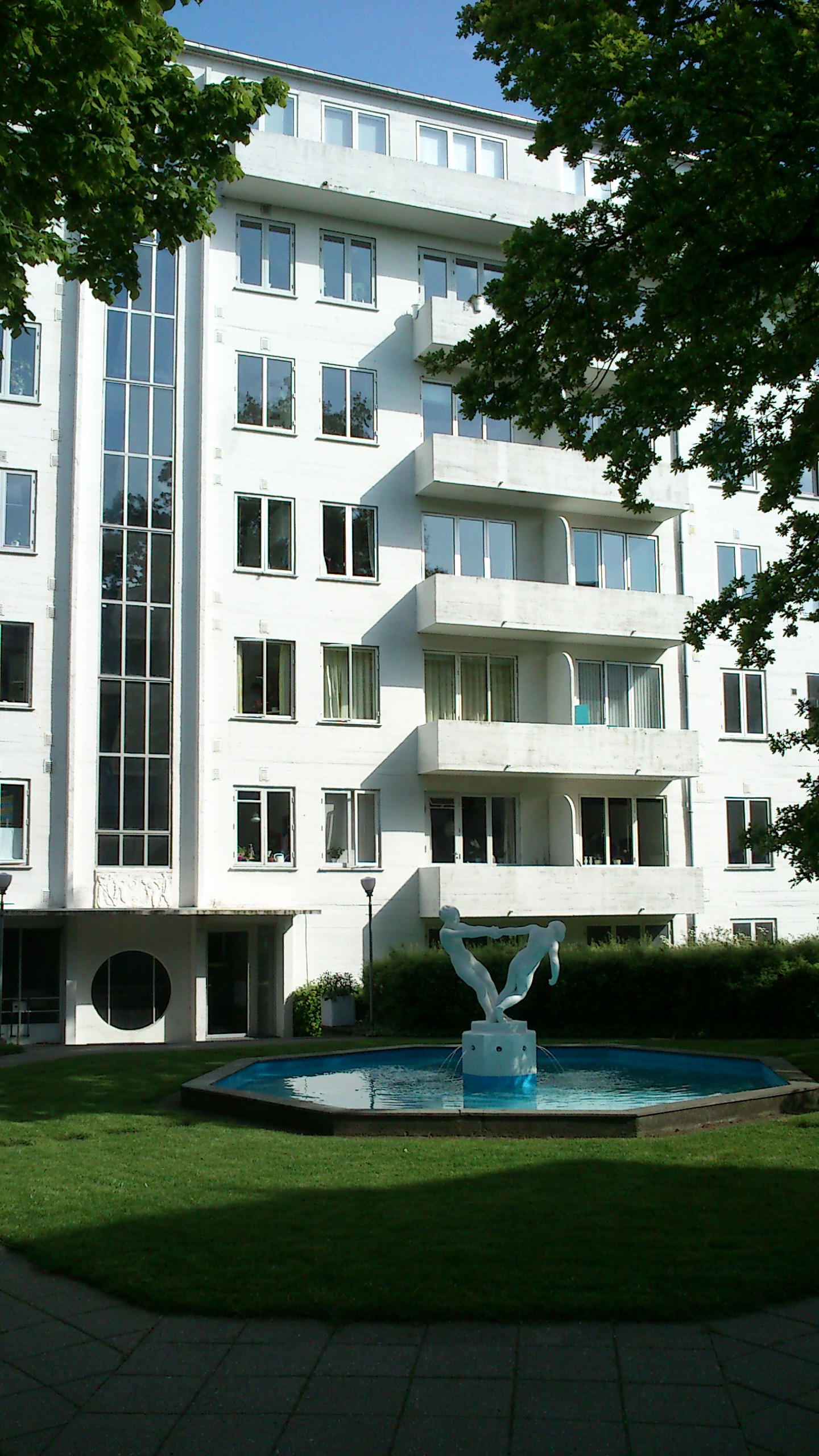
From the atrium garden at Klintegaarden.
