= Trøjborg =

- Neighborhood
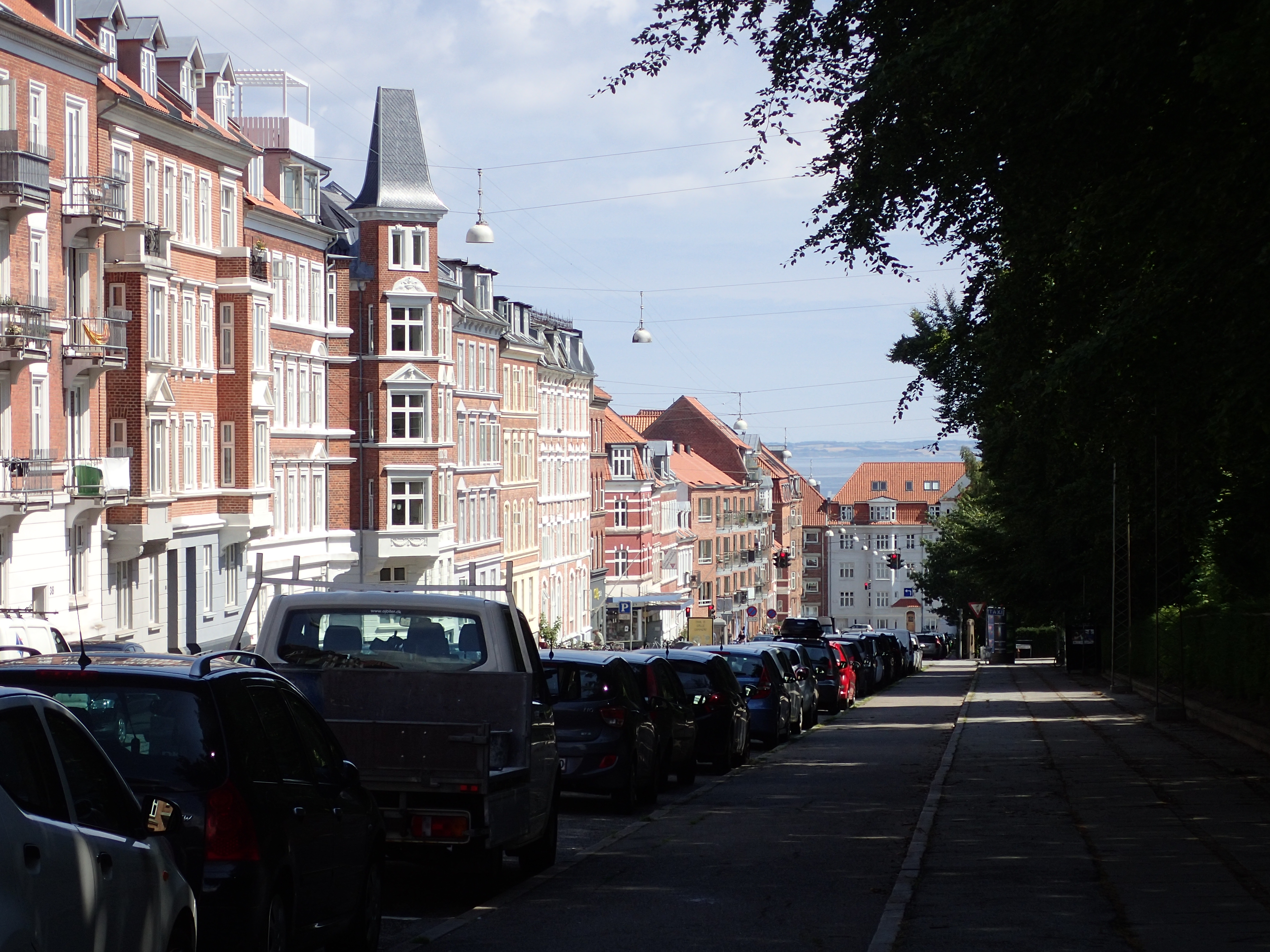
- Trøjborg. The street of Trøjborgvej roughly marks the southern limits of this neighbourhood.

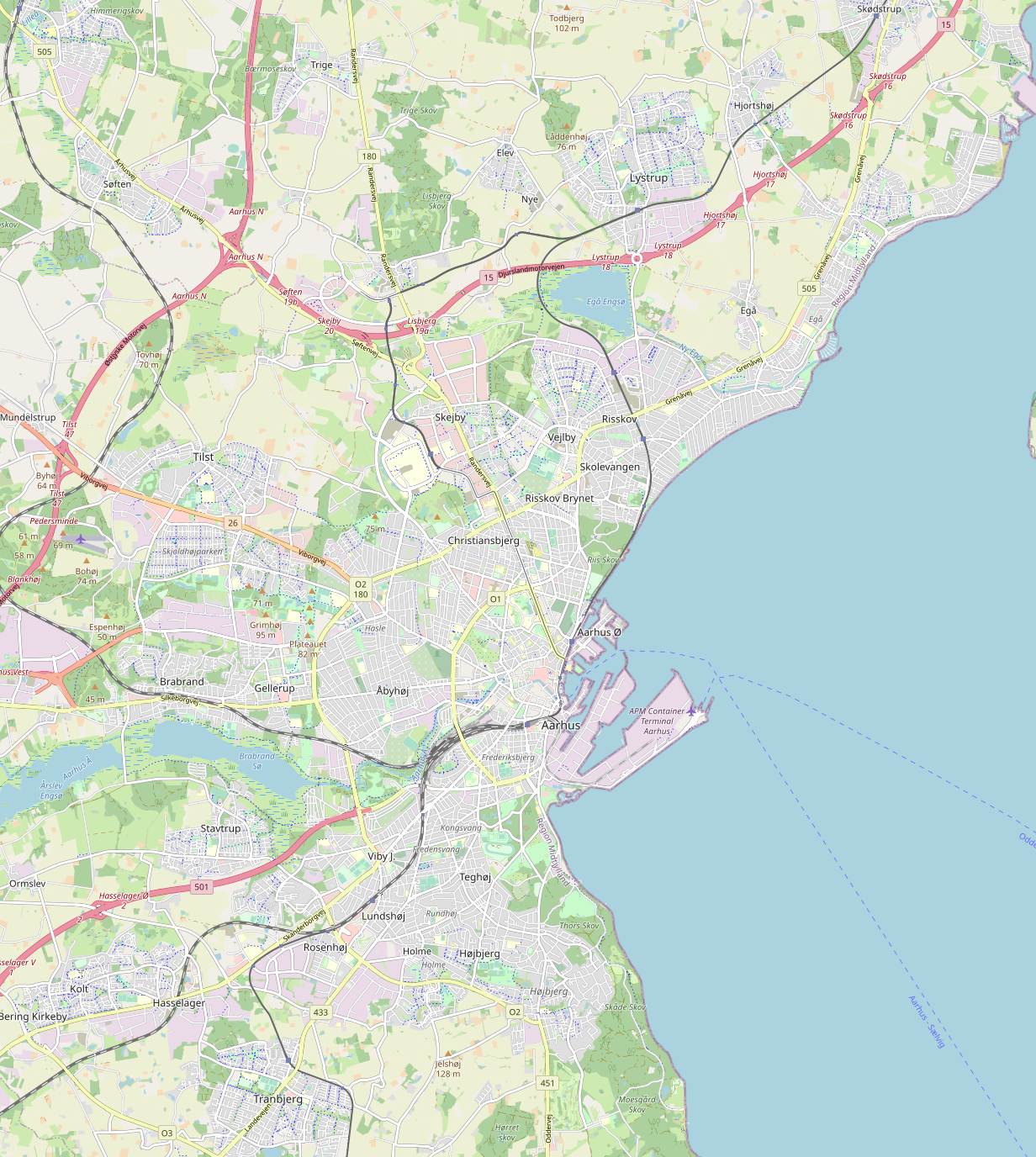
- Location within Aarhus
- Coordinates: 56.173°N 10.2151°E
- Country: Kingdom of Denmark
- Regions of Denmark: Central Denmark Region
- Municipality: Aarhus Municipality
- District: Aarhus N

Population
  - Total: c. 11,000
- Postal code: 8200

Trøjborg is a neighborhood in the city of Aarhus, Denmark in Skt. Johannes parish with about 11,000 residents as of 2015. The neighborhood is part of the district Aarhus N and borders the neighborhoods Nørre Stenbro to the South West, Risskov to the North and Riis Skov and the Bay of Aarhus to the East. Trøjborg is delimited by the streets Dronning Margrethesvej, Trøjborgvej and Nordre Ringgade.

== Etymology ==
Trøjborg, formerly Troyæborg, is used to denote buildings and areas in several places in Denmark. The name originates from the labyrinth at the castle of the classical Troy and is often used to name places that are naturally labyrinthine. In the case of Aarhus, the name is first seen in a document from 1632 mentioning Trøjborgbæk and again in 1758 when a garden called Trøjborg beyond the city gate at Mejlgade was sold. The name is likely a reference to the hilly landscape around Riis Skov.

== History ==
The neighborhood developed as a working-class district in response to rapid population growth resulting from industrialization in the early 20th century. The area originally consisted of grazing land for the cattle of the city but in 1851 the city walls around Aarhus were dismantled opening the lands for development. In 1880, the large graveyard Nordre Kirkegård was established and the lands north of the graveyard were parceled and sold off to developers. Trøjborg was gradually developed in stages, with the first 5,000 apartments being built from 1896 to 1902 and the last between 1928 and 1937.

== Outline ==
Trøjborg's architecture is mixed. Large villas, industrial sites and some apartments were constructed in the late 19th century, and in the 1930s, the area was fully developed with city blocks and organized city planning. The streets in the neighborhood are named after notable Danish naval officers such as Niels Juel, Steen Bille and Herluf Trolle; the main street is named after Danish-Norwegian Tordenskjold.

Trøjborg is characterized from other neighborhoods and districts in Aarhus by a well-developed local community separate from the rest of Midtbyen. The neighborhood has some 100 stores and shops, a cinema, the Trøjborg Centret mall, a local community organization, a local radio station, and a building that offers various recreational activities and facilities.

== Gallery ==
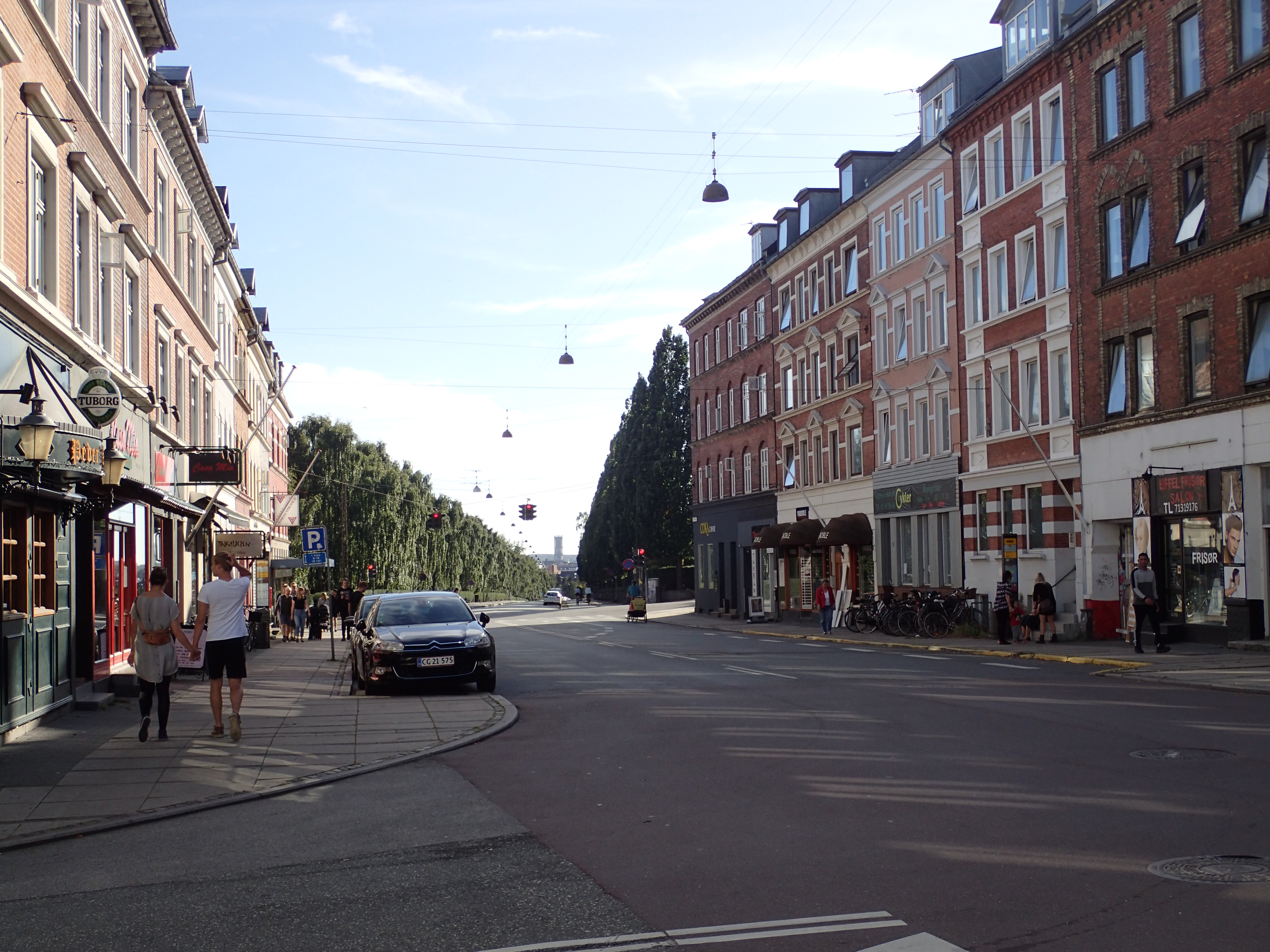
Tordenskjoldsgade is the main street of Trøjborg.

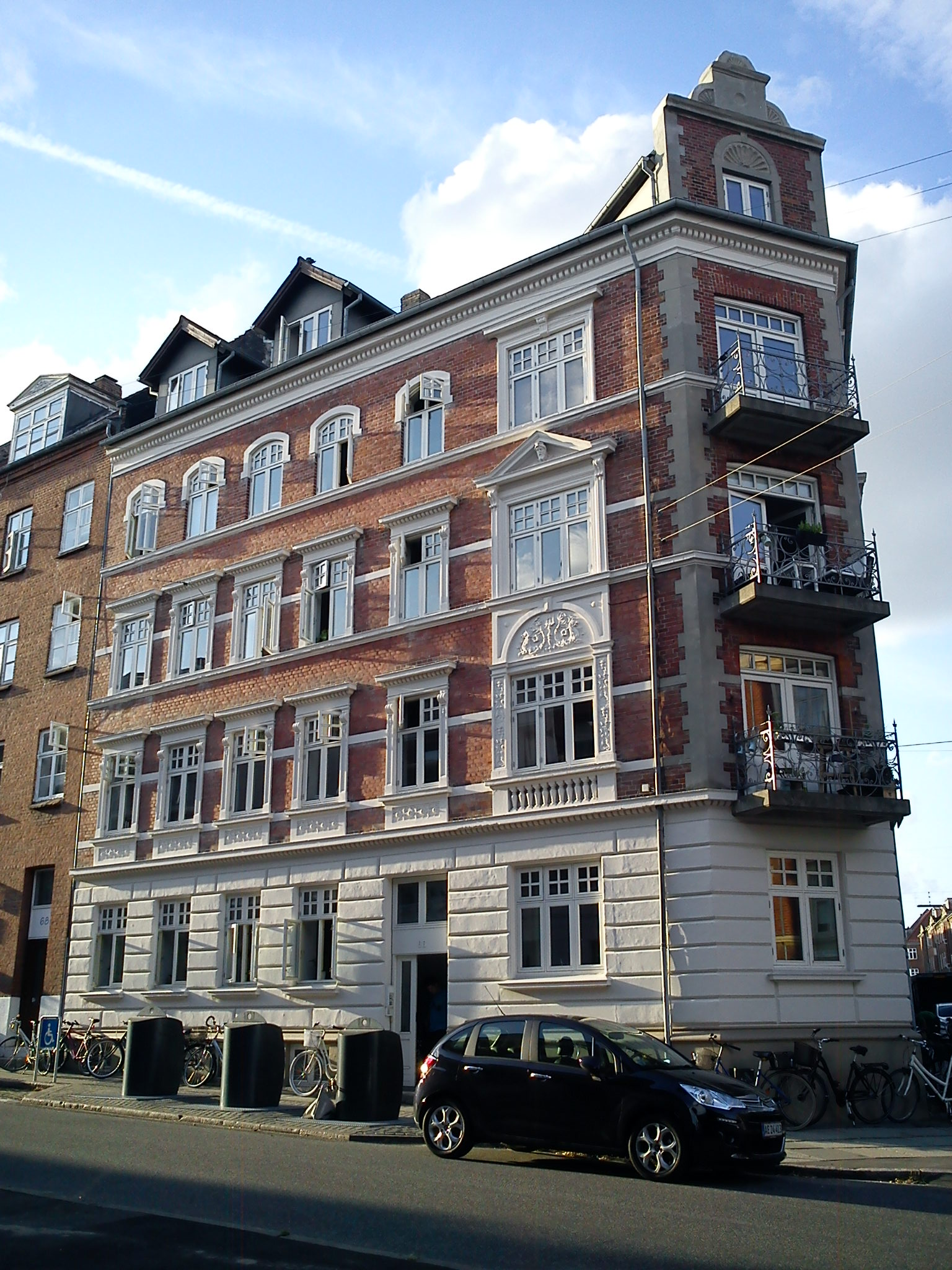
One of the first apartment blocks to be built on Trøjborg (1901).

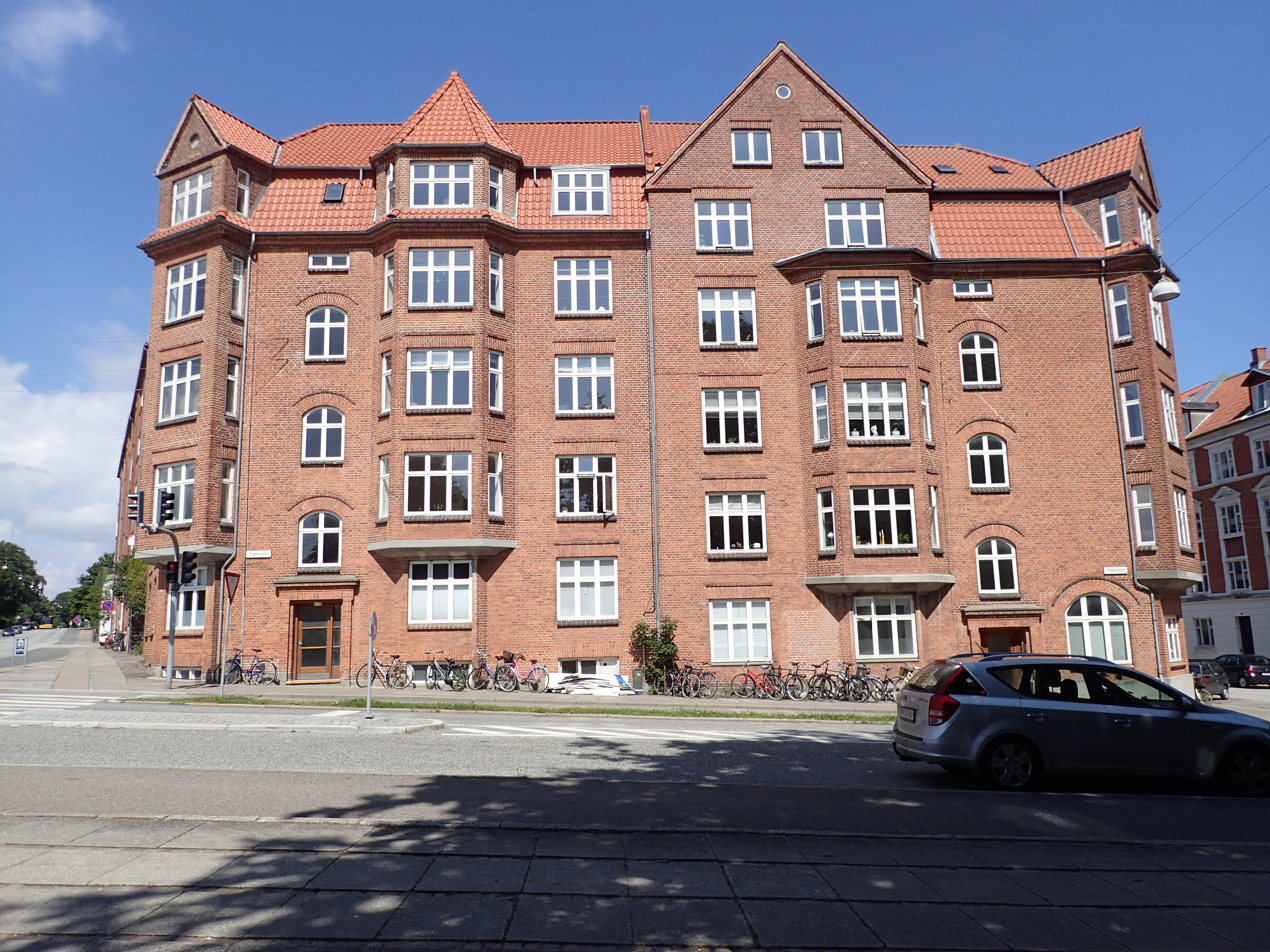
Typical apartment block in red brick (1914).

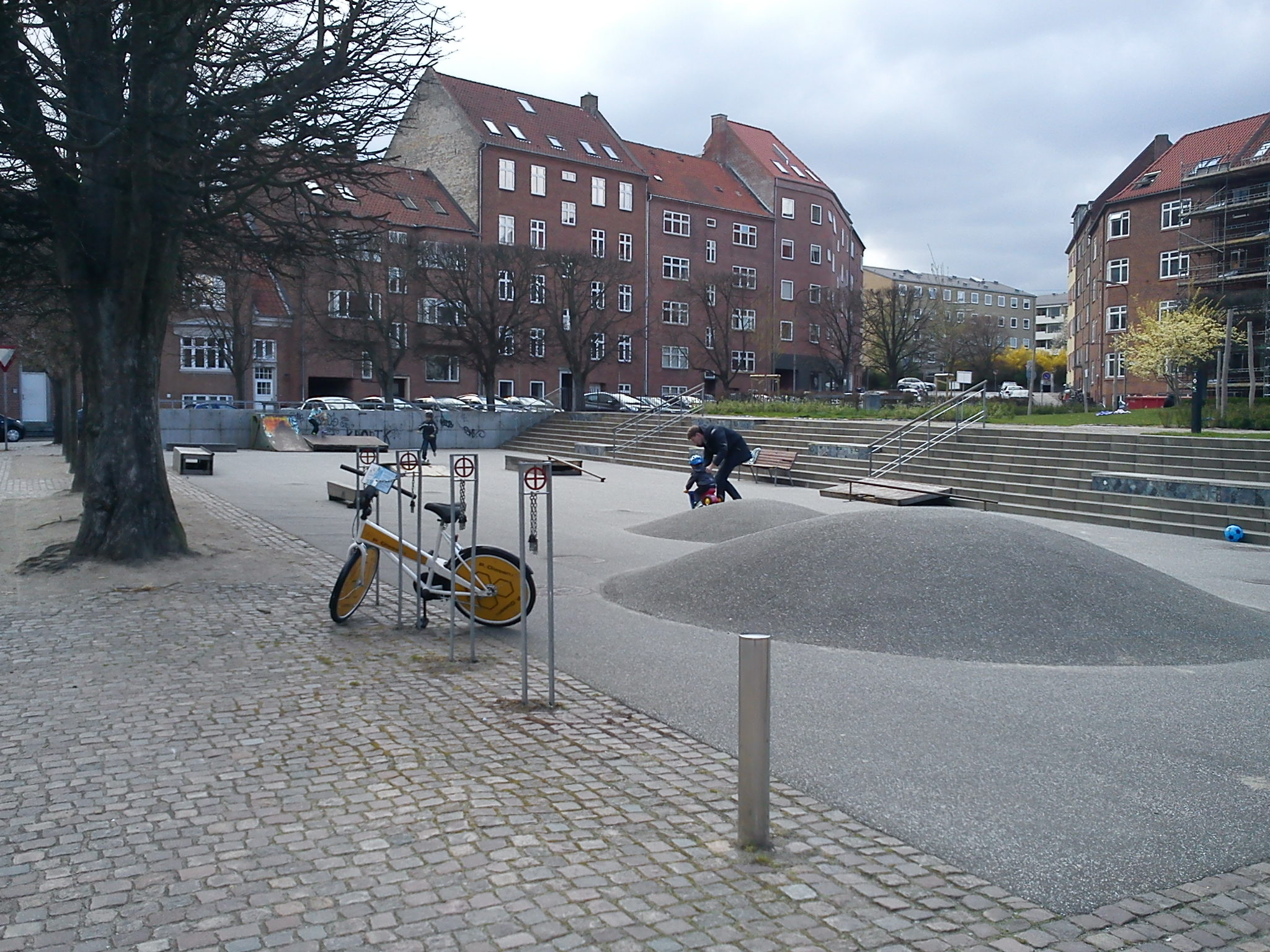
The square of Steen Billes Torv with city bikes, playgrounds and a green area.

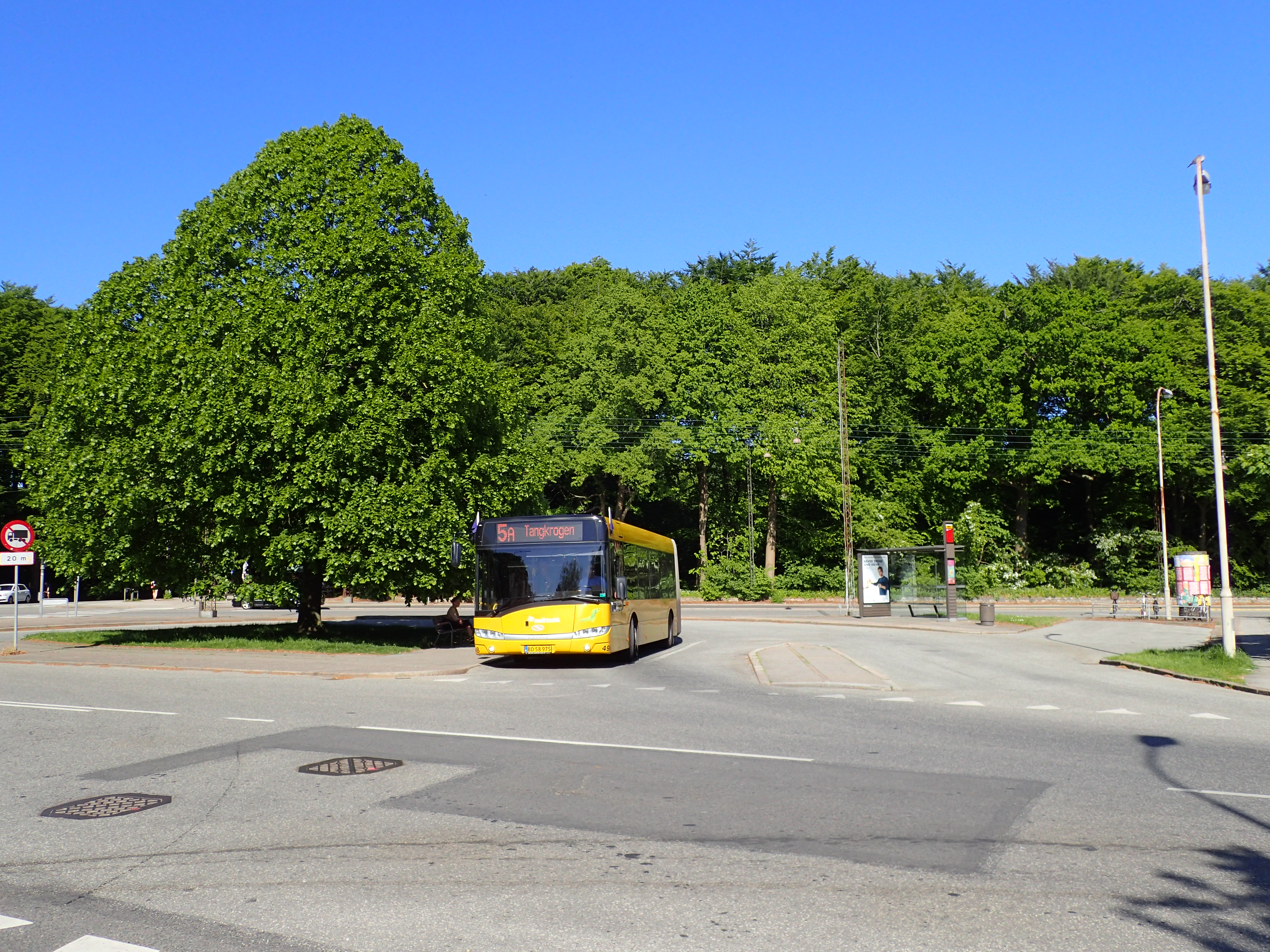
Marienlund, bus terminus and official gateway to Risskov Forest.
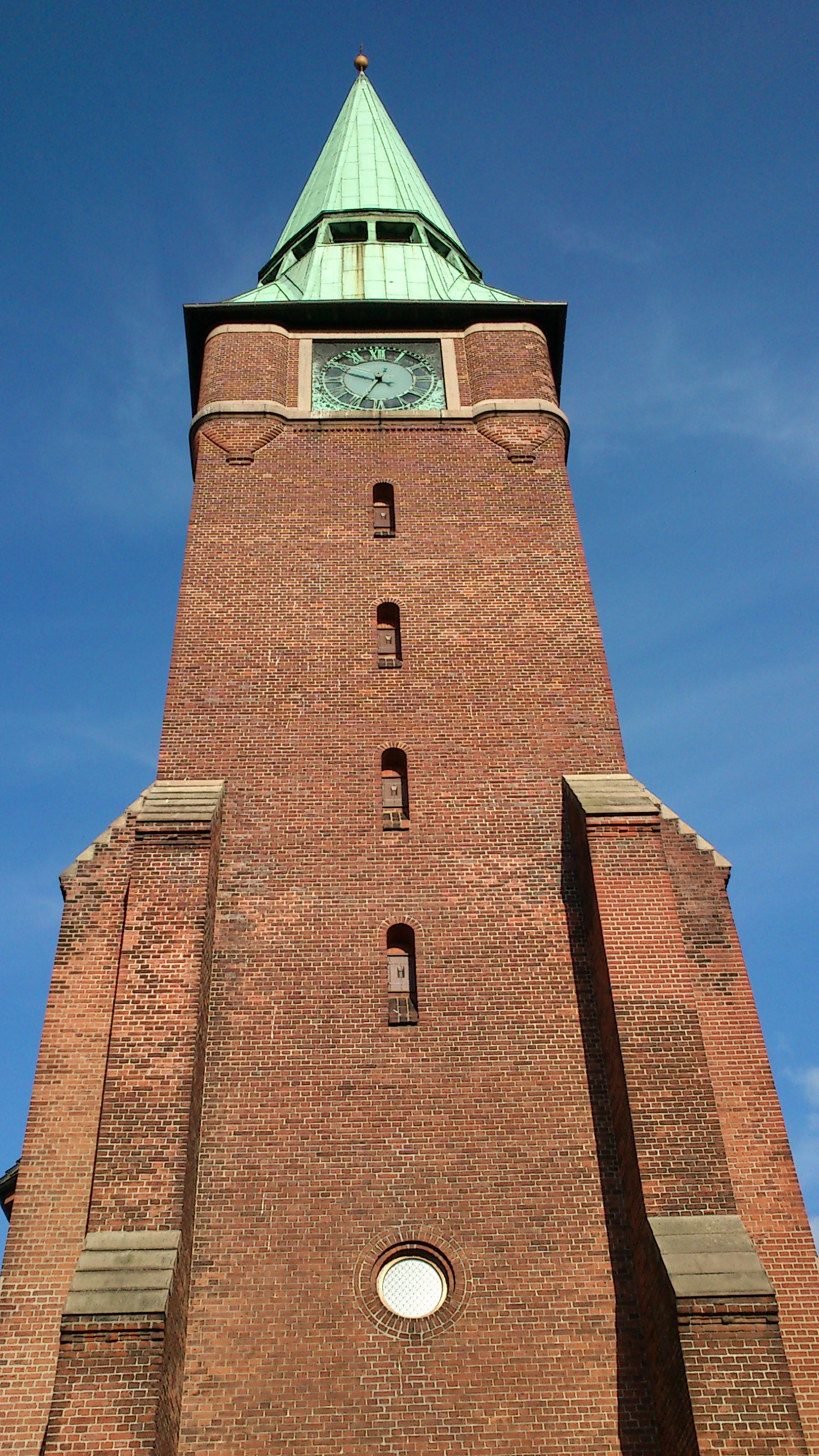
Sankt Johannes Kirke (St. John's Church), bell tower.

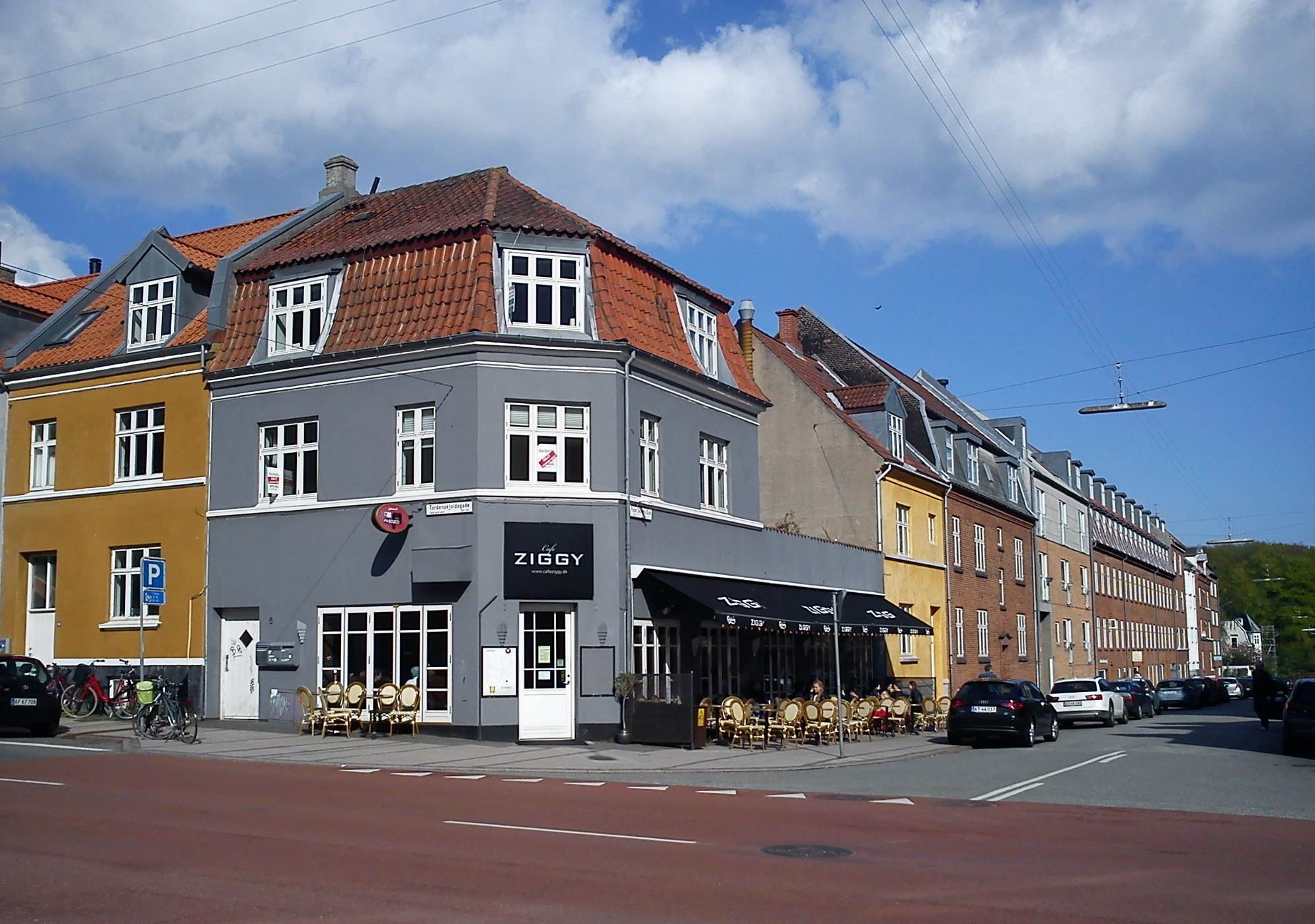
Cafés and housing blocks.

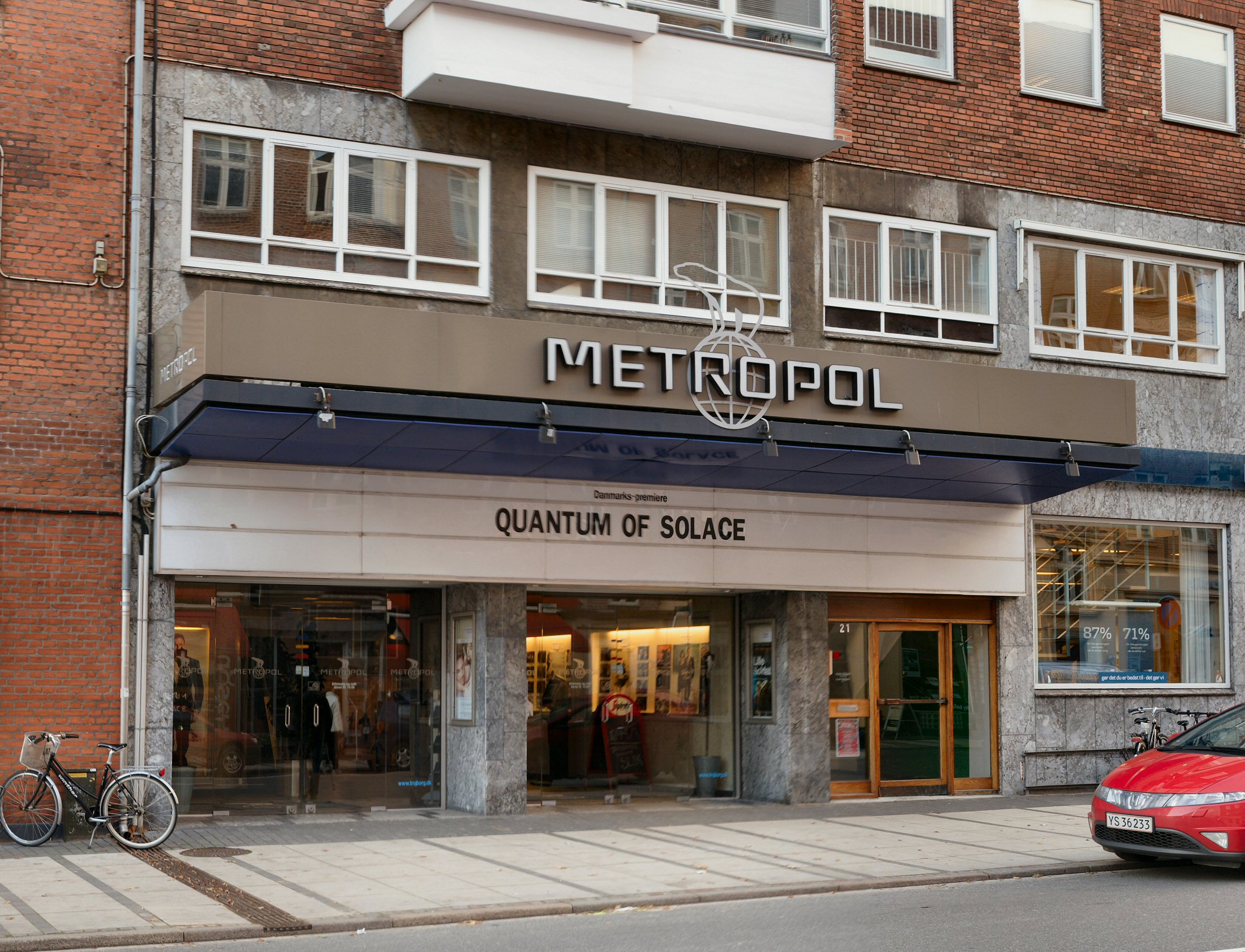
Cinema.
