= Klintegaarden =

Coordinates: 56.16813°N 10.21935°E

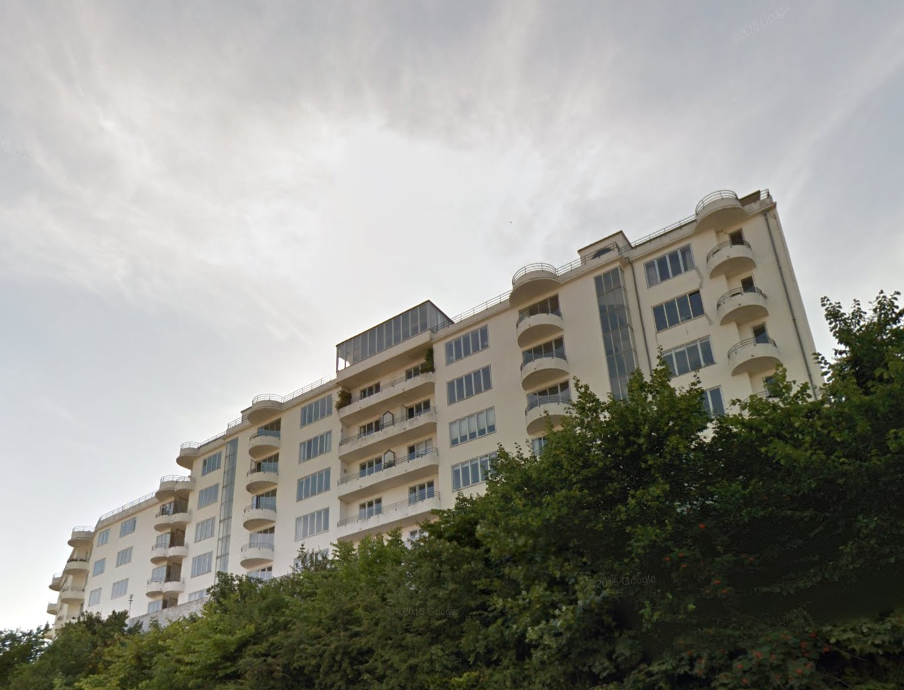
- Interactive map of the Klintegaarden area

General information
- Architectural style: Functionalism
- Location: Aarhus, Denmark
- Construction started: 1936
- Completed: 1938

Technical details
- Floor count: 6

Design and construction
- Architect: Hans Ove Christensen

Website
- Klintegaardens Website

Klintegarden is an apartment complex and a number of listed buildings in Aarhus, Denmark. The complex was built in 1938 and was listed in the Danish registry of protected buildings and places by the Danish Heritage Agency on 9 December 2013. The buildings represent one of the most significant and important examples of early 20th-century functionalist architecture in Aarhus.

The complex is situated on a hill slope immediately south of the Riis Skov urban forest in the Skovvejskvarteret neighbourhood of the inner city. It consists of two 6-floor apartment buildings facing the road Skovvejen and the Bay of Aarhus respectively, with two older villas placed between them in an atrium garden. The villas are from 1896 (Villa Højbo) and 1900 (Villa Sunhill) and were remodeled in the years 1936–38 when the apartment blocks were built. The complex is today a condominium.

== History ==
In the early 20th century the ideals of historicism were replaced by functionalism which in Denmark became popular after the Stockholm Exhibition of 1930. Functionalism broke with the former historical imitations and use of decorations to focus on materials and their function. Attention was paid to use of materials that could be mass-produced and tying form, function and technique together. In Aarhus the style is best exemplified by the University by C.F. Møller and Kay Fisker, the City Hall by Arne Jacobsen and Erik Møller and Klintegaarden by Hans Ove Christensen.

Today the complex fits into the surroundings with many buildings of similar size but at the time it was built it towered above the city as one of the tallest buildings in it on a hill high above it. Architecturally the buildings were unique for the time with simple features and a clean white exterior. The engineer Ove Christensen had previously designed four other functionalist developments in the city and he made Klintegaarden one of the most modern residential buildings at the time.

== Facilities ==
The complex is designed with community and collectivism in mind. The two villas on the property were remodeled and fit into the new complex as community units with banquet room, billiard rooms, playrooms for children and guest rooms. There was a small restaurant where it was possible to eat or order food to the apartments and a cleaning service. The space between the apartment blocks and around the central villa was made into a garden with fountains and trees from the former gardens of the villas.

The interior was modern for the time with refrigerators, garbage chutes for every unit, central heating in all rooms and both hot and cold water in both kitchen and bathroom – a luxury in the interwar period. In the building facing the Bay of Aarhus there was elevators and in the basements electrical washing facilities and an underground parking garage so cars and bicycles were removed from the street. The overall vision with the many communal facilities was to create a community where the residents lived close and had a clean safe, environment to play in while everyday life wasn't hampered by daily chores. The cost of the facilities was covered through the rent which added a collectivist aspect.

Over time the public facilities have disappeared. The villas have been made into private homes and the apartments changed from rents to condos. The original ideals were unique for the time and an experiment which drew much attention but it did not last.

== Architecture ==
The apartment complexes are 6 stories of concrete elements topped with a flat roof. The windows sit flush with the facade in vertical rows broken by exterior or interior balconies. On the side facing the water, the balconies are round while they are rectangular towards the courtyard and street. The apartment complexes are made of thin elements which is very visible in the exterior, giving the massive buildings a lightness.

On the water-facing side, the buildings have many maritime elements highlighting the relationship with the water and port below. On the roof height differences have been used to create a displacement reminiscent of a ship's bridge and the long communal rooftop terrace is guarded by a slender rail with round windows on the walls behind, inspired by the sundeck on an ocean liner. The narrow hallways inside have rounded windows to the outside given the feel of a cabin hallway.

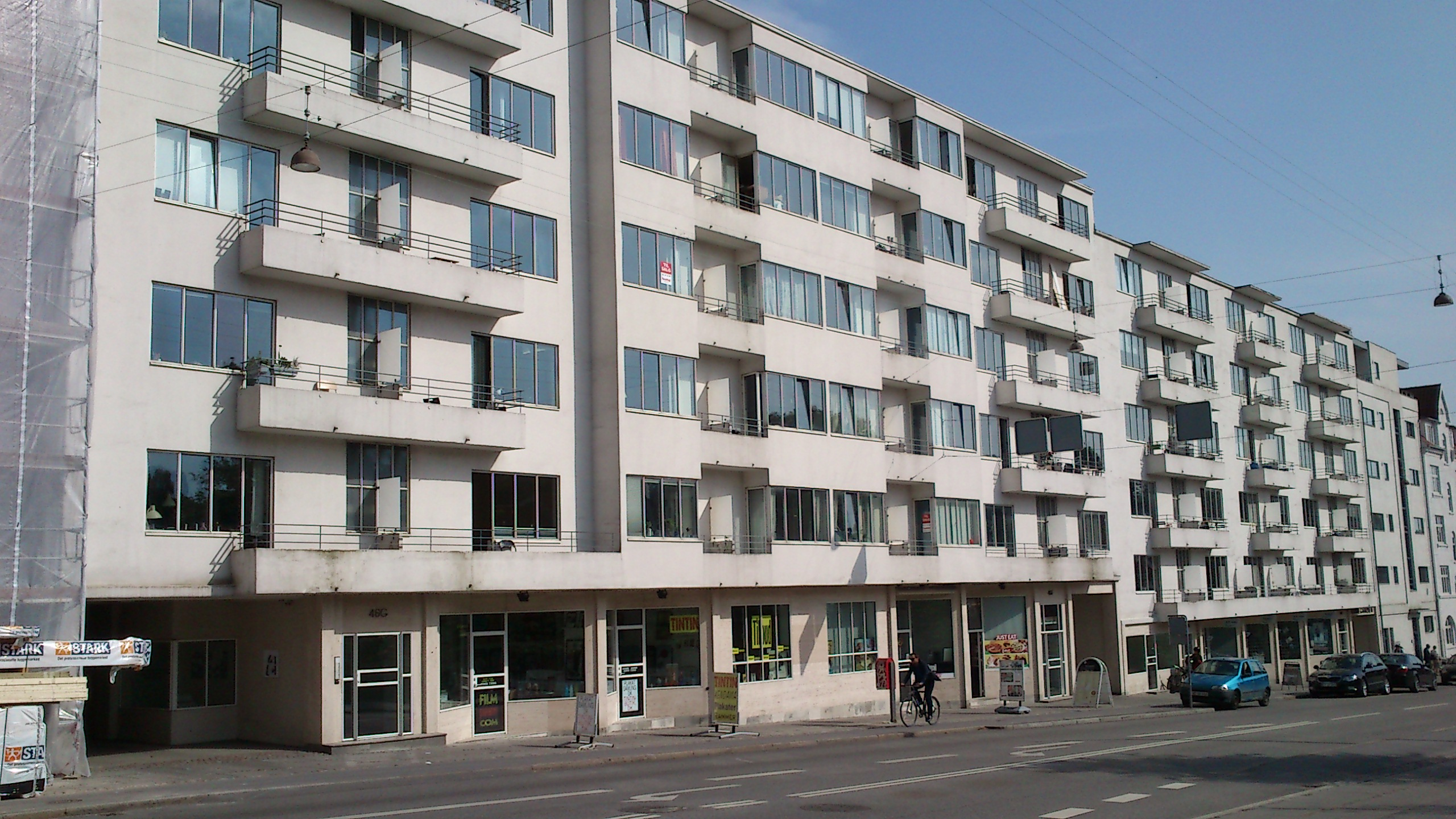
The roadside facade of Klintegaarden.

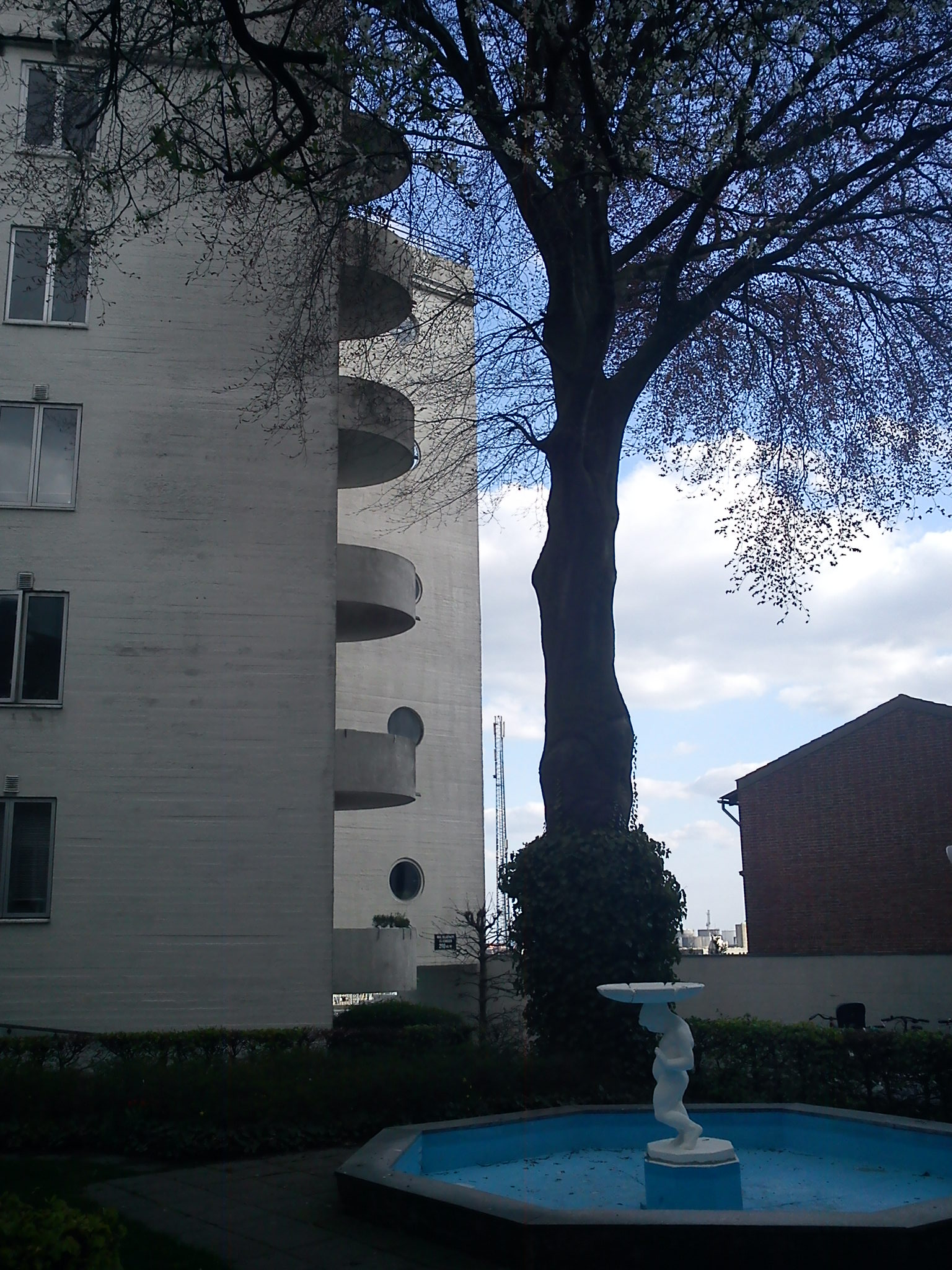

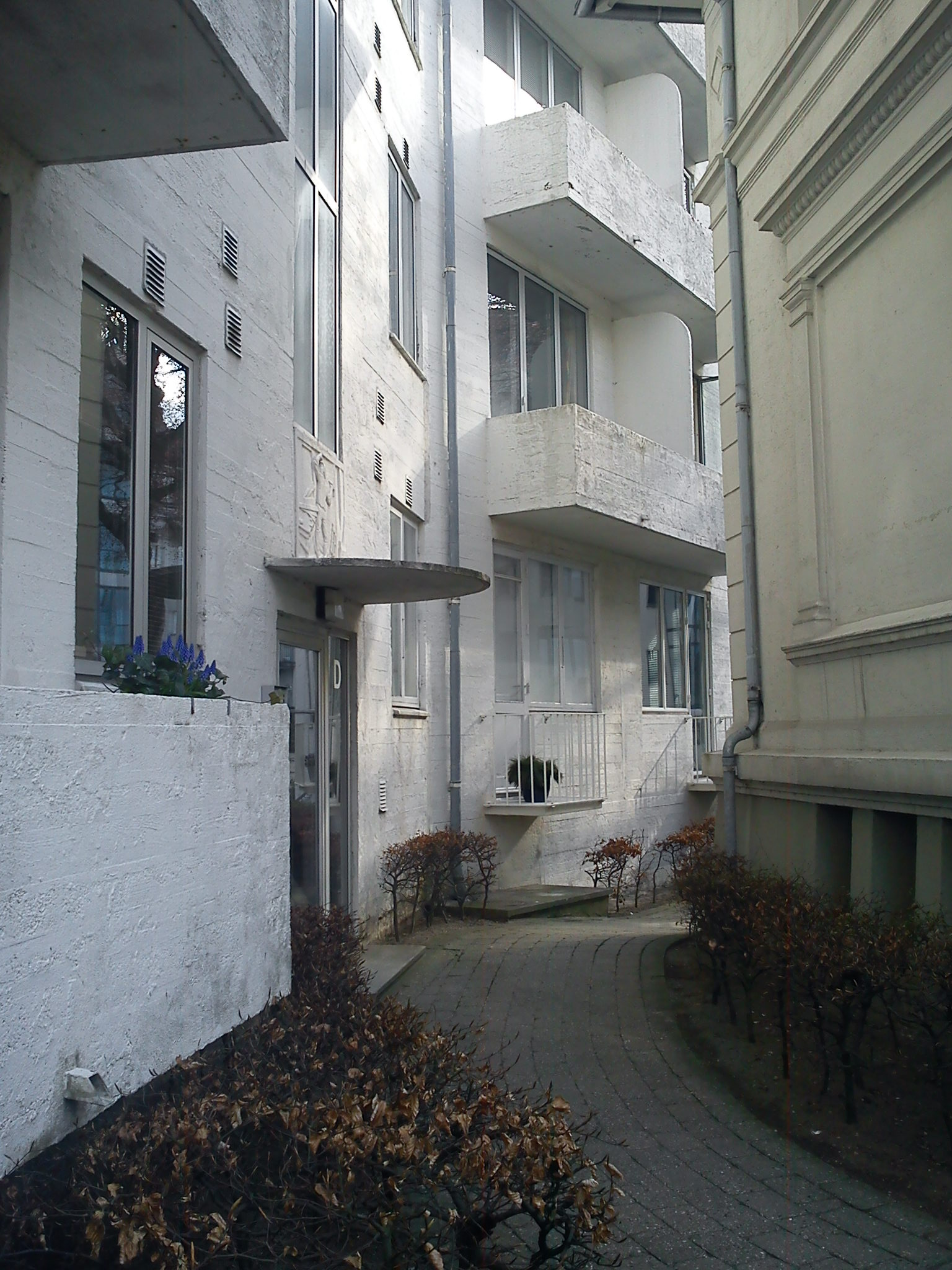

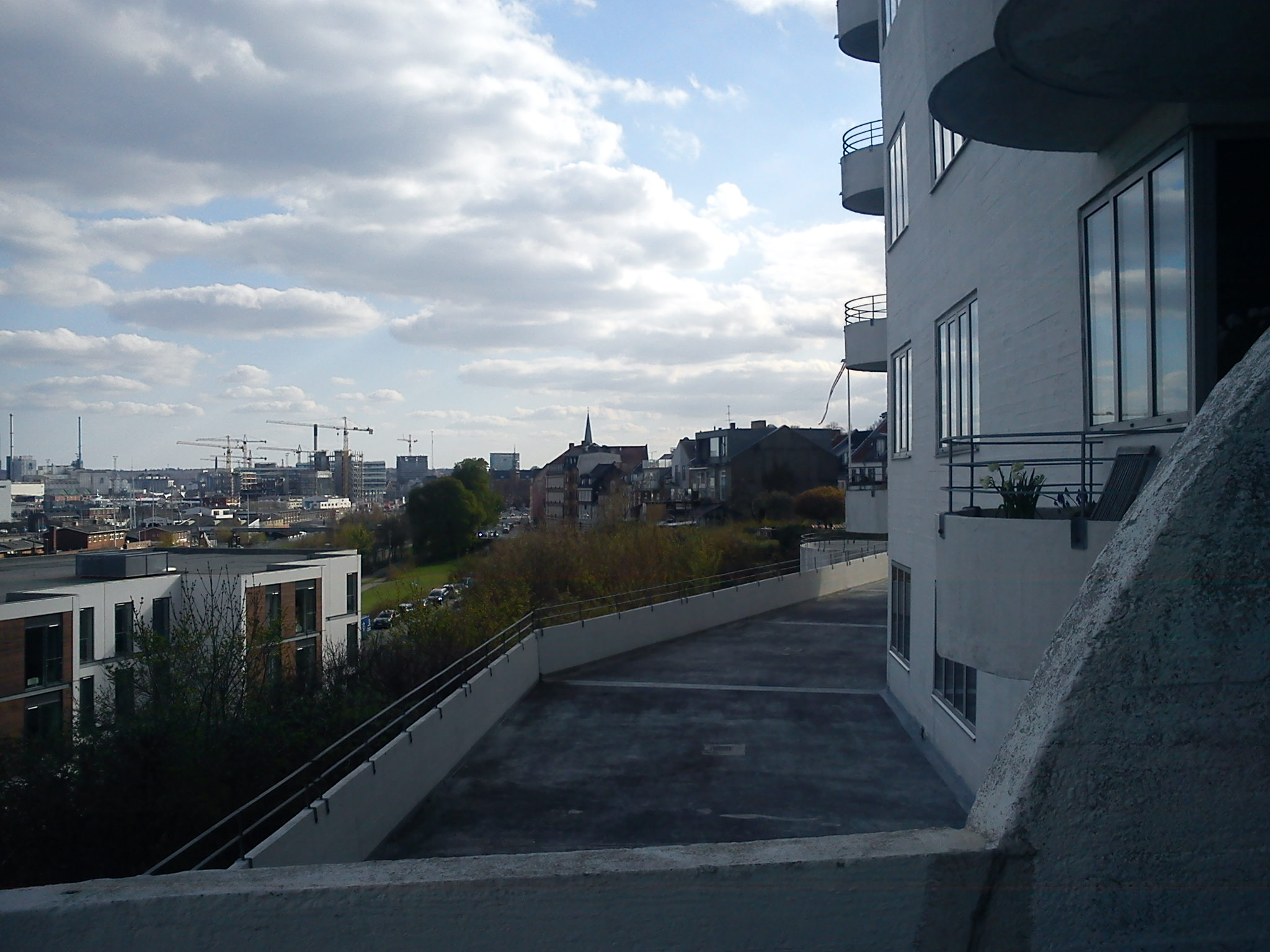
Skyline view from the shared terraces

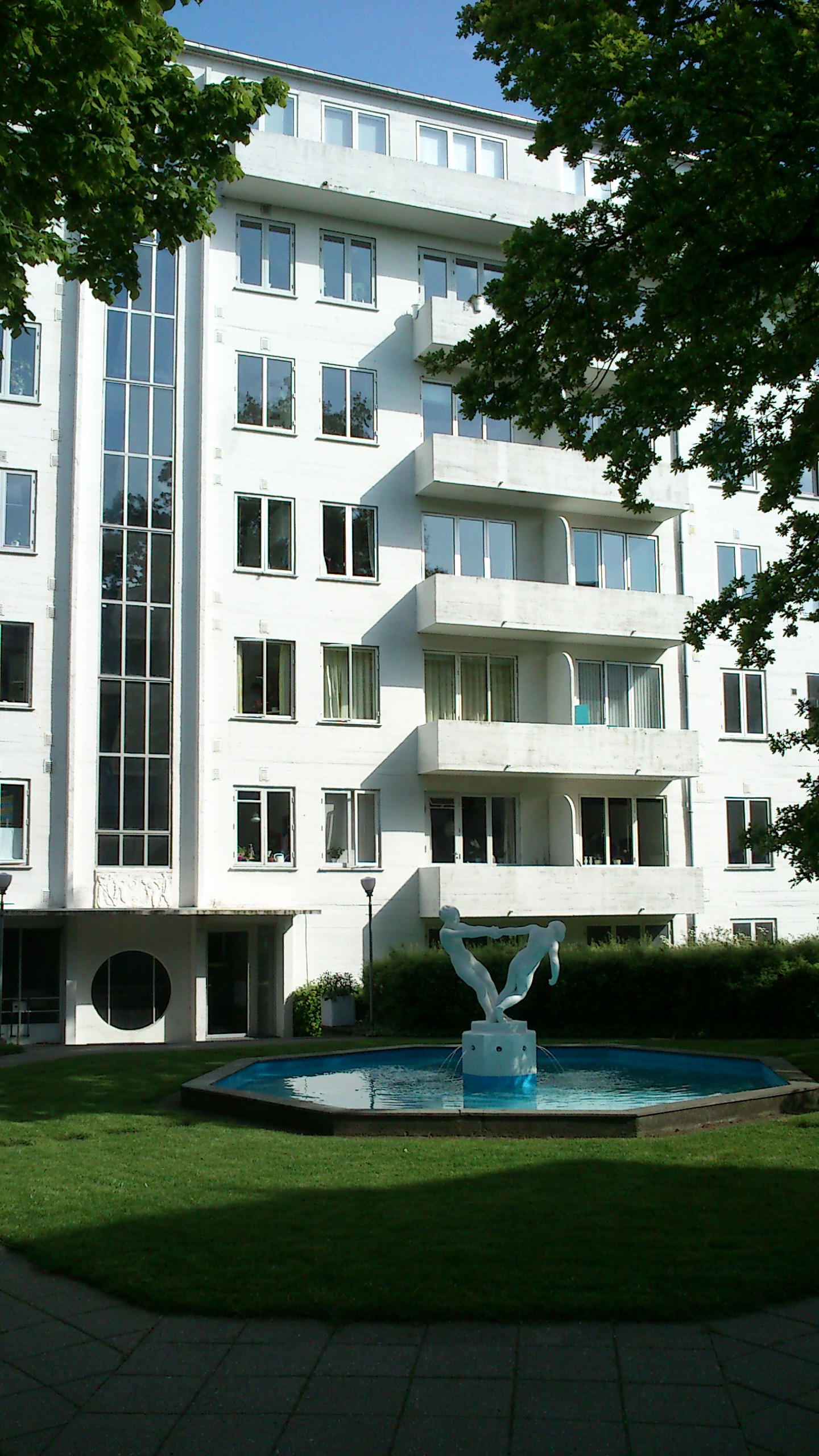
From the atrium

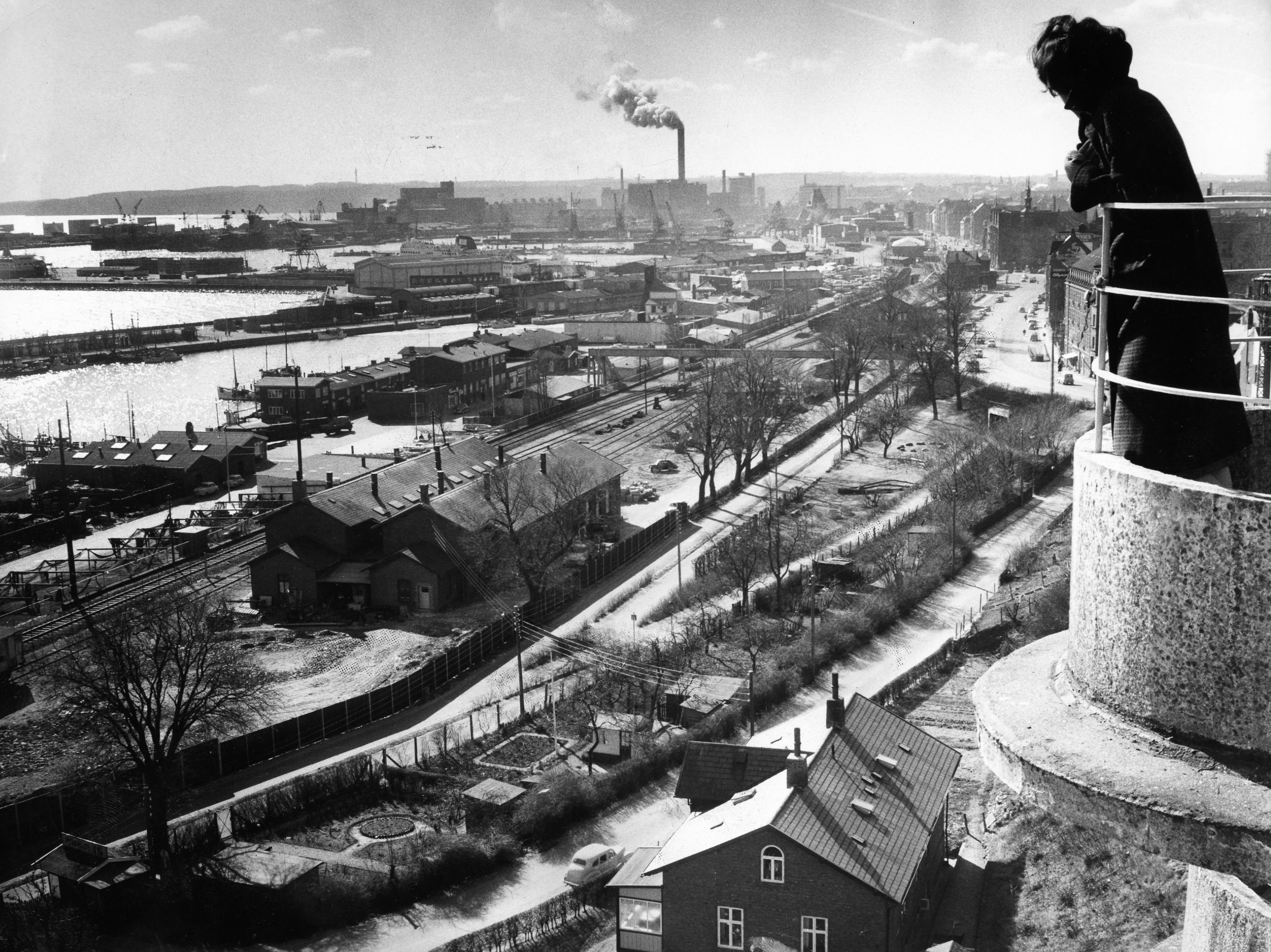
Vintage photograph (1962)
