= Jan Maegaard =

Danish musicologist and composer (1926–2012)

Jan Maegaard (14 April 1926 – 27 November 2012) was a Danish musicologist and composer.

He took the mag.art. degree at the University of Copenhagen in 1957, and the dr.philos. degree with a thesis about Schönberg in 1972. He also had a composer education at the Royal Danish Conservatory of Music, studying among others under Poul Schierbeck.

He was professor of musicology at the University of Copenhagen from 1971 to 1996, except for the years 1978 to 1981 when he was a visiting professor at the University of California, Los Angeles. He also worked as a music critic. He was a fellow of the Norwegian Academy of Science and Letters from 1988.
