= Friis & Moltke =

Danish architectural practice

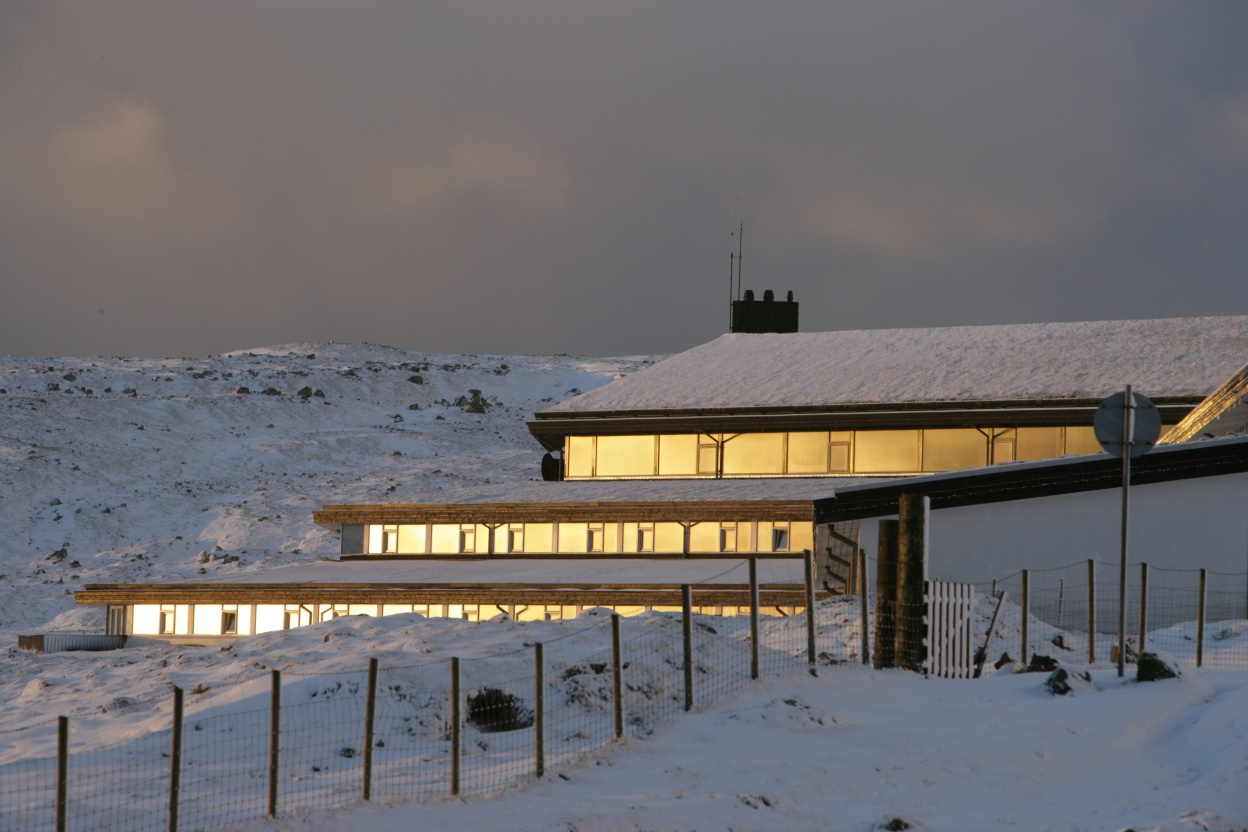
- Hotel Foroyar

Practice information
- Partners: Thomas H. Svendsen; Line Frier; Thomas Ruus Christensen; Mikkel Bahr; Mikkel Wienberg
- Founders: Knud Friis; Elmar Moltke Nielsen
- Founded: 1955
- Location: Aarhus

Significant works and honors
- Buildings: Hotel Foroyar; Gigantium; Musikkens Hus

Website
- https://friis-moltke.dk/

Friis & Moltke is a Danish architectural practice headquartered in Aarhus with branch offices in Copenhagen and Aalborg. Friis & Moltke has about 50 employees and is mainly active in the Scandinavian market. The firm was founded in 1955 by the architects Knud Friis and Elmar Moltke Nielsen who met while working at C. F. Møller Architects in Aarhus. Today the company has 6 partners and 1 associated partner responsible for the department of furniture design.

== Selected projects ==
Friis & Moltke has designed many celebrated buildings across Denmark. The projects covers a multitude of functionalities including residential, educational, stadiums, churches, shopping malls, prisons, city halls, concert halls and hotels. A selection of the most notable comprise the following:

=== Aarhus ===
- Hotel Marselis, 1967
- Scanticon, Skåde, 1969
- Risskov Gymnasium, 1969
- Grøfthøjhuset, Viby J, 1970
- Nordgårdskolen, Brabrand, 1970 (demolished 2014)
- Vestervang, 1970
- Skjoldhøj Kollegiet, 1973
- Ellevang Church, 1974
- Langkær Gymnasium, Tilst, 1975
- Skjoldhøj Church, 1983
- Skelager Church, 1990
- Scandinavian Center, 1992

Near Aarhus

- Odder City Hall, Odder, 1971
- Skanderborg Gymnasium, Skanderborg, 1973
- Silkeborg Gymnasium, Silkeborg, 1977

=== Aalborg ===
- Aalborg Stadion, 2002
- University College Nordjylland, 2003
- Gigantium, 2005
- Musikkens Hus, 2014

=== Zealand ===
- Vordingborg Uddannelsescenter, Vordingborg 1980
- Grønnevang Church, Hillerød, 2008

=== Other places ===
- Vestjydsk Handelsskole, Skjern, 1965
- Hotel Lakolk, Rømø, 1966
- Entreprenørskolen, Ebeltoft, 1968
- Viborg Gymnasium og HF, Viborg, 1974
- Hotel Nyborg Strand, Nyborg, 1977
- Radisson SAS H.C. Andersen Hotel, Odense, 1980
- Morsø Rådhus, Nykøbing Mors, 1980
- Herning Kongrescenter, Herning, 1982
- Øer Maritime Ferieby, Ebeltoft, 1988
- Statsfængslet Østjylland, Horsens, 2001
- Holstebro Police Station, Holstebro, 2016

Friis & Moltke has been notable architects of the so-called brutalist architecture, a specific branch of the much broader modernist movement. Brutalism had its heyday in the 1960s and 70s, and noteworthy examples from Friis & Moltke includes Hotel Lakolk, Entreprenørskolen, Scanticon Skåde and Odder City Hall in particular. Outside Denmark, the Siemens Global Leadership Center, and associated guest hotel, from 1974 is a prize-winning example of Friis & Moltke's architecture of the brutalist era.

=== Outside Denmark ===
Friis & Moltke is also active outside Denmark with notable and prize-winning architecture:

- Embassy of Denmark in Ankara (1970), Ankara, Turkey
- Siemens Global Leadership Center (1974), Feldafing, Germany
- Alter Hafen (2011), Wismar, Germany
- Dublin Waste to Energy (2017), Poolbeg Peninsula, Ireland
- Strømme Senter (in 2019), Kristiansand, Norway
- Ny Anstalt i Nuuk (in 2019), Nuuk, Greenland

== Gallery ==
60's and 70's

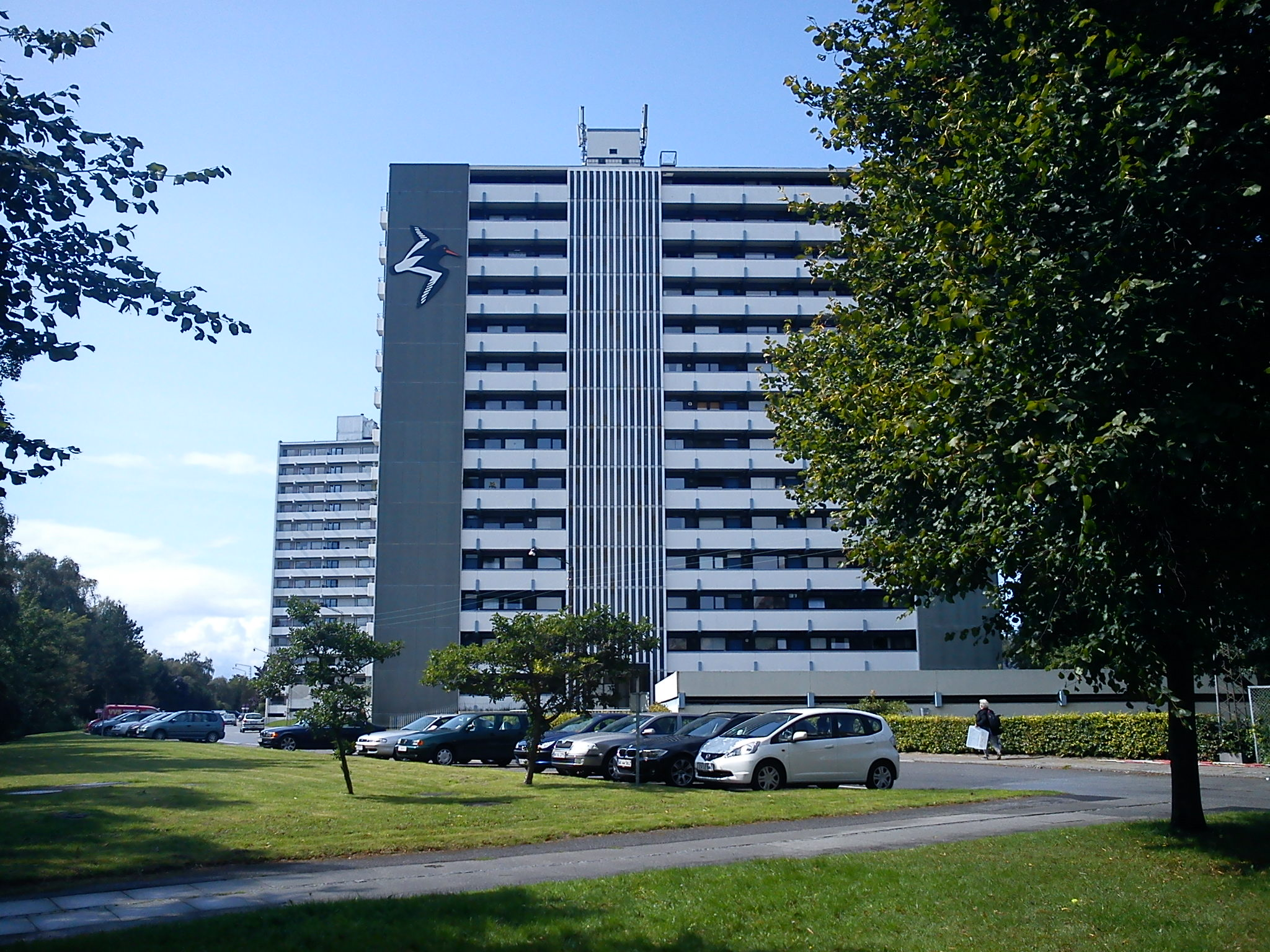
Højhusene Marselis Boulevard, residential (1967)

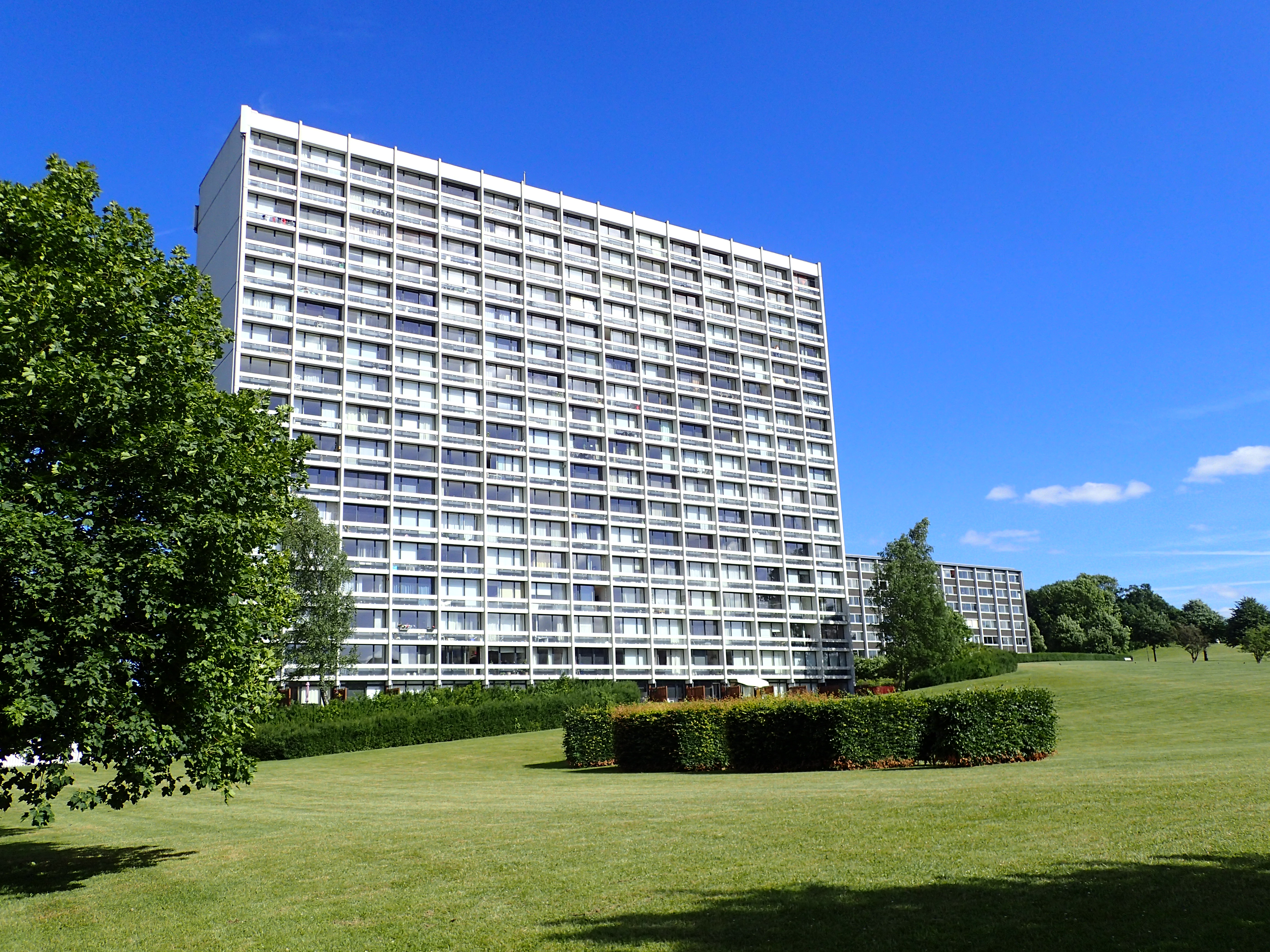
Grøfthøjhuset, residential (1970)

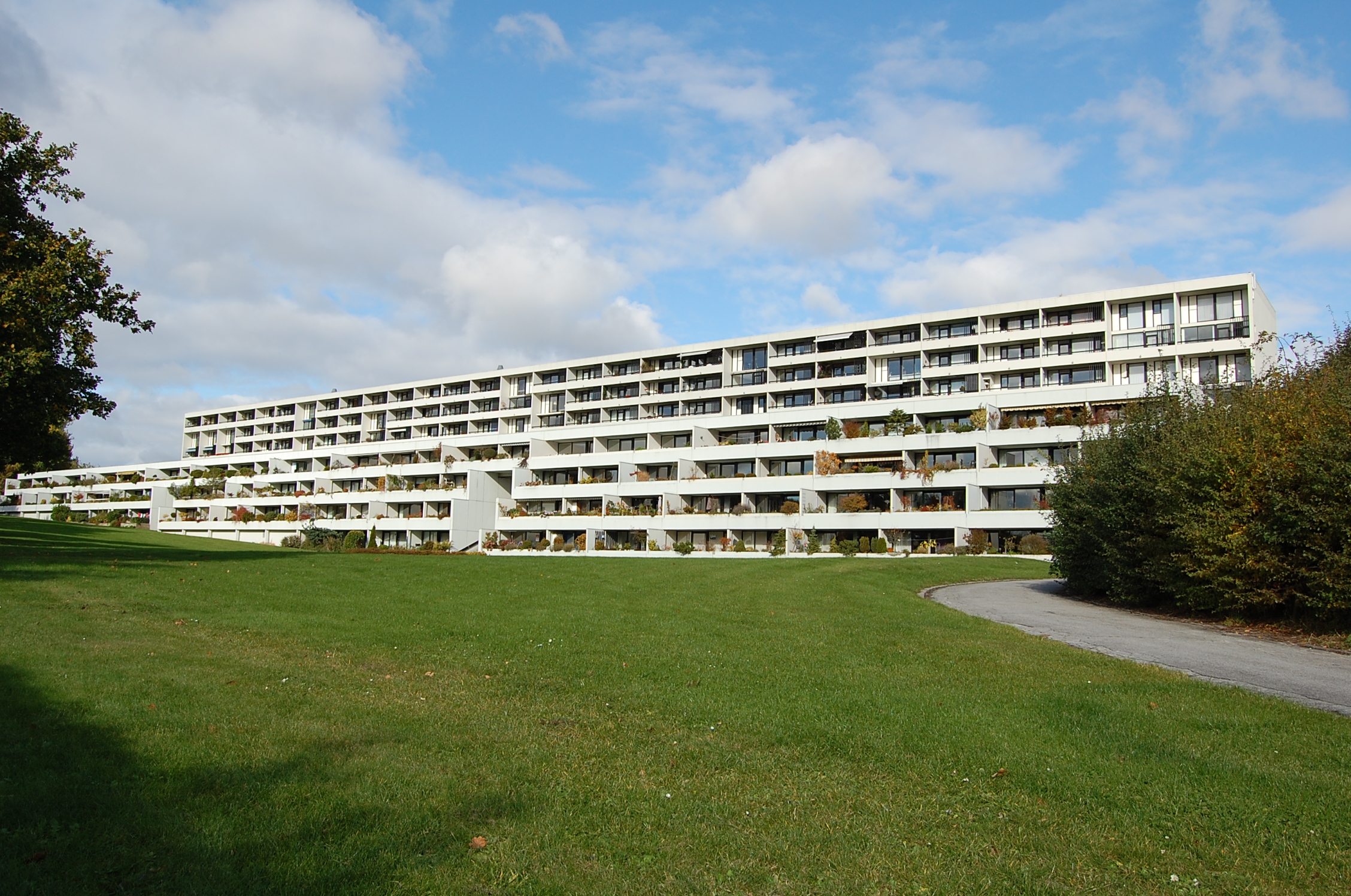
Vestervang, residential (1970)

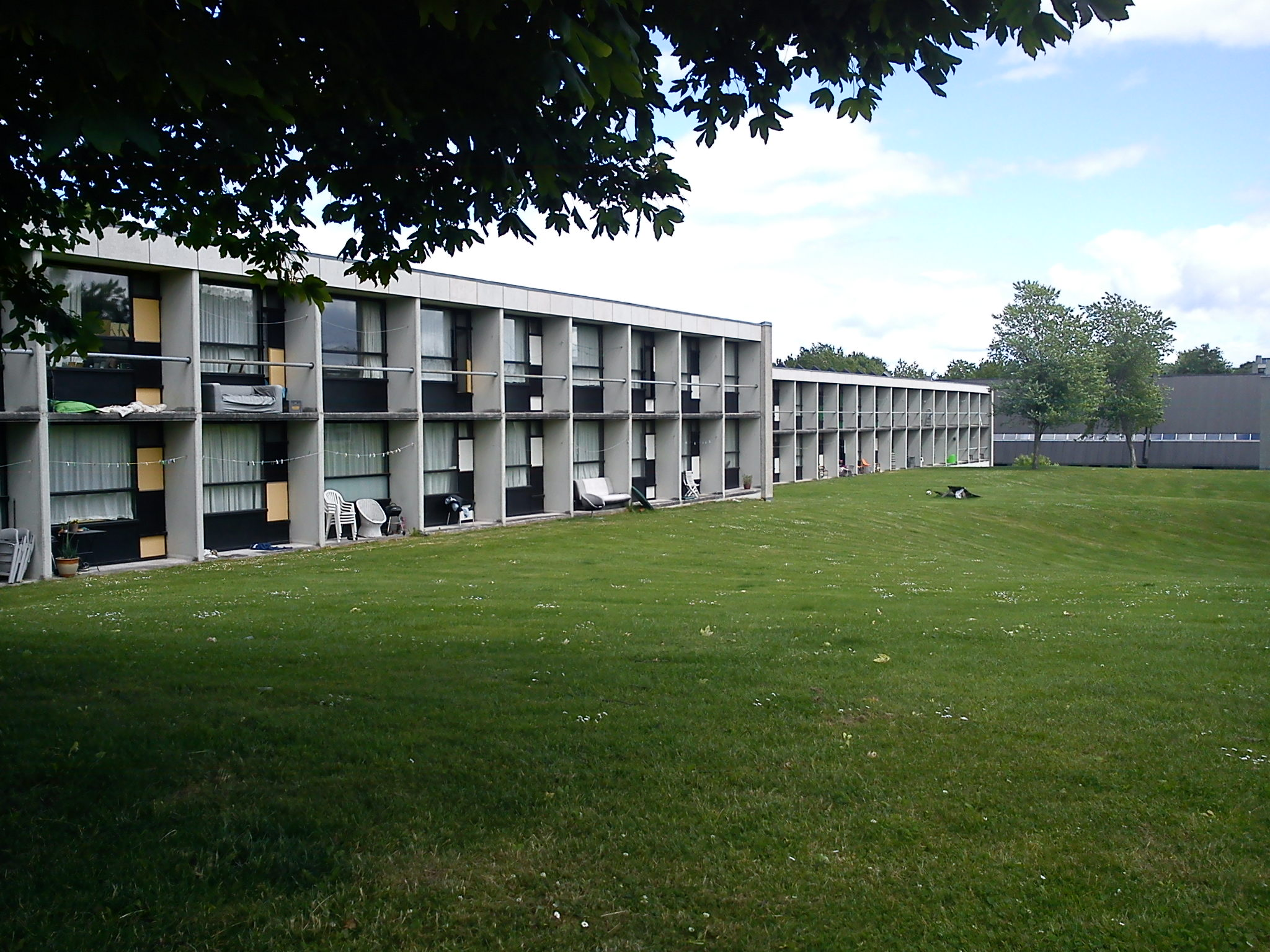
Skjoldhøjkollegiet, a large student housing project (1973)

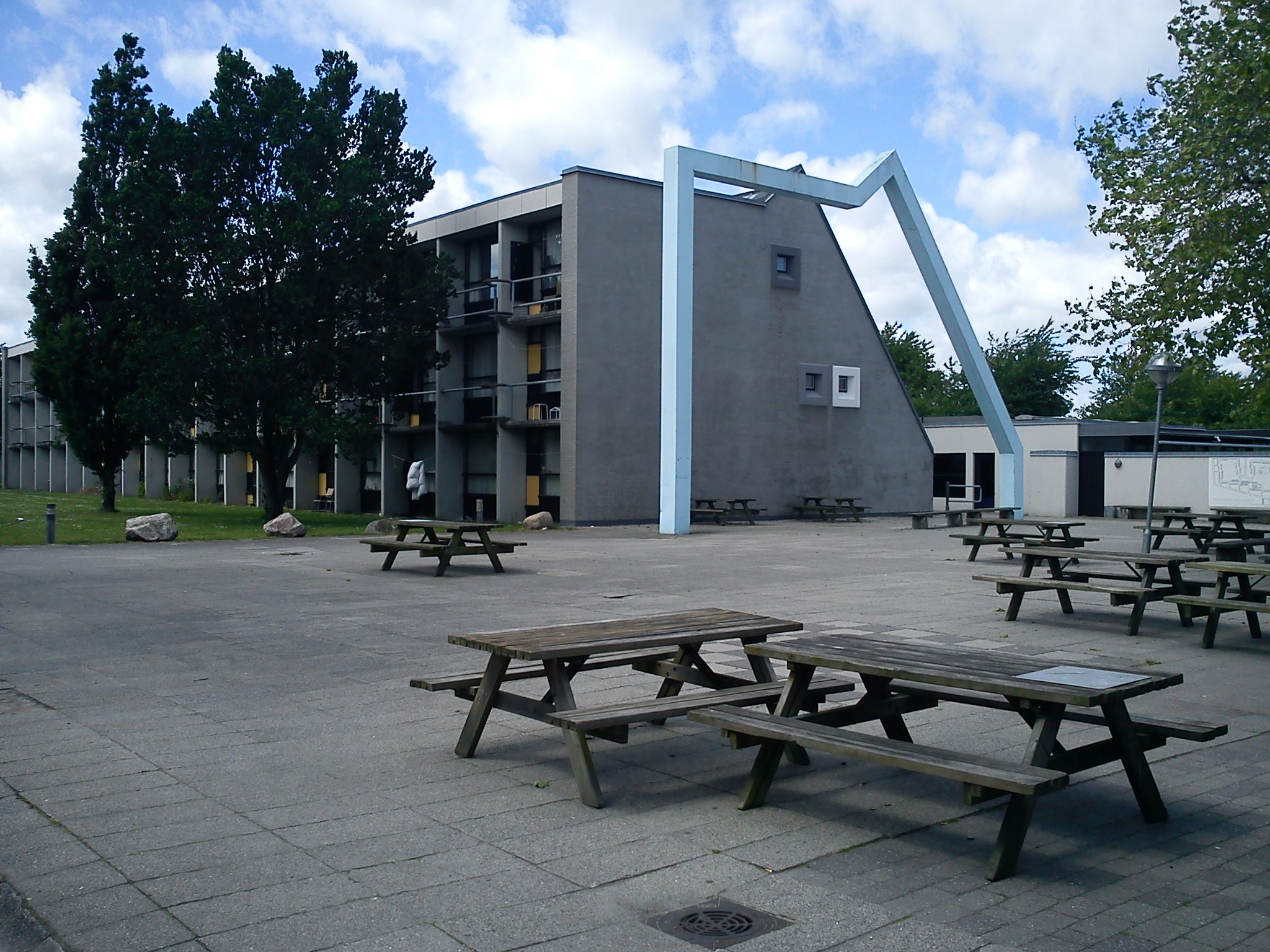
Skjoldhøjkollegiet (detail)

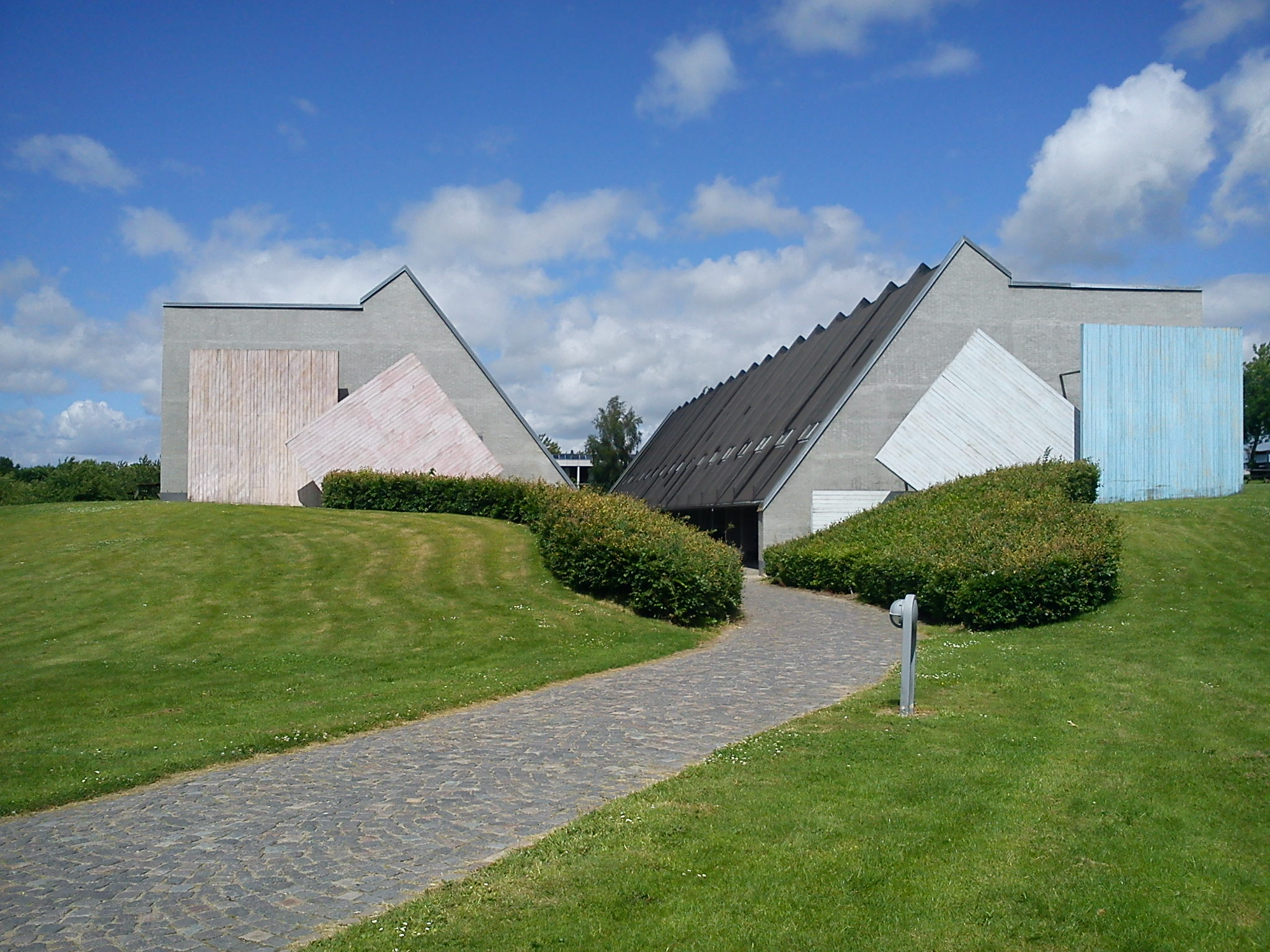
Skjoldhøjkollegiet (detail)

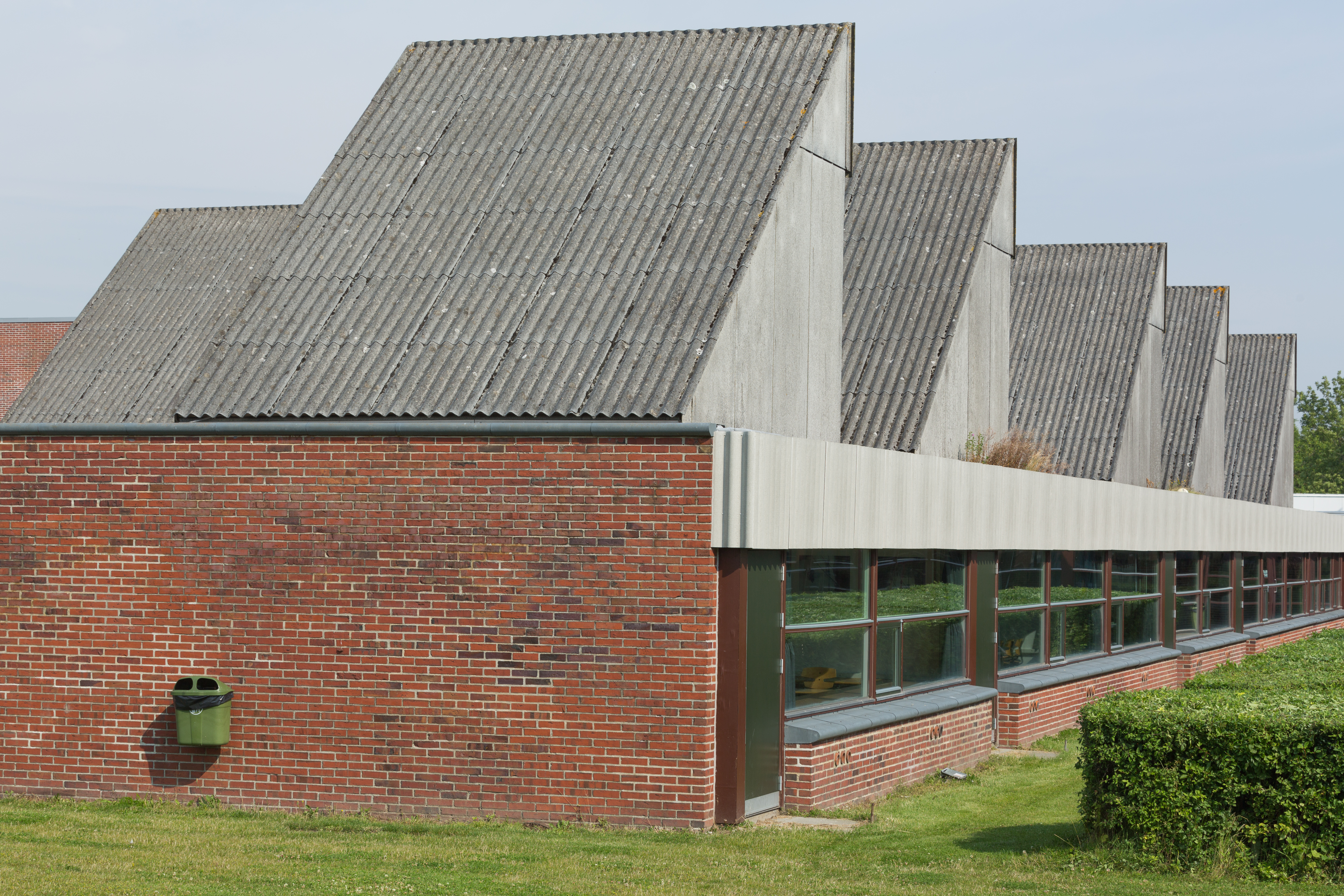
Langkær Gymnasium, a high school (1975)

80's and 90's

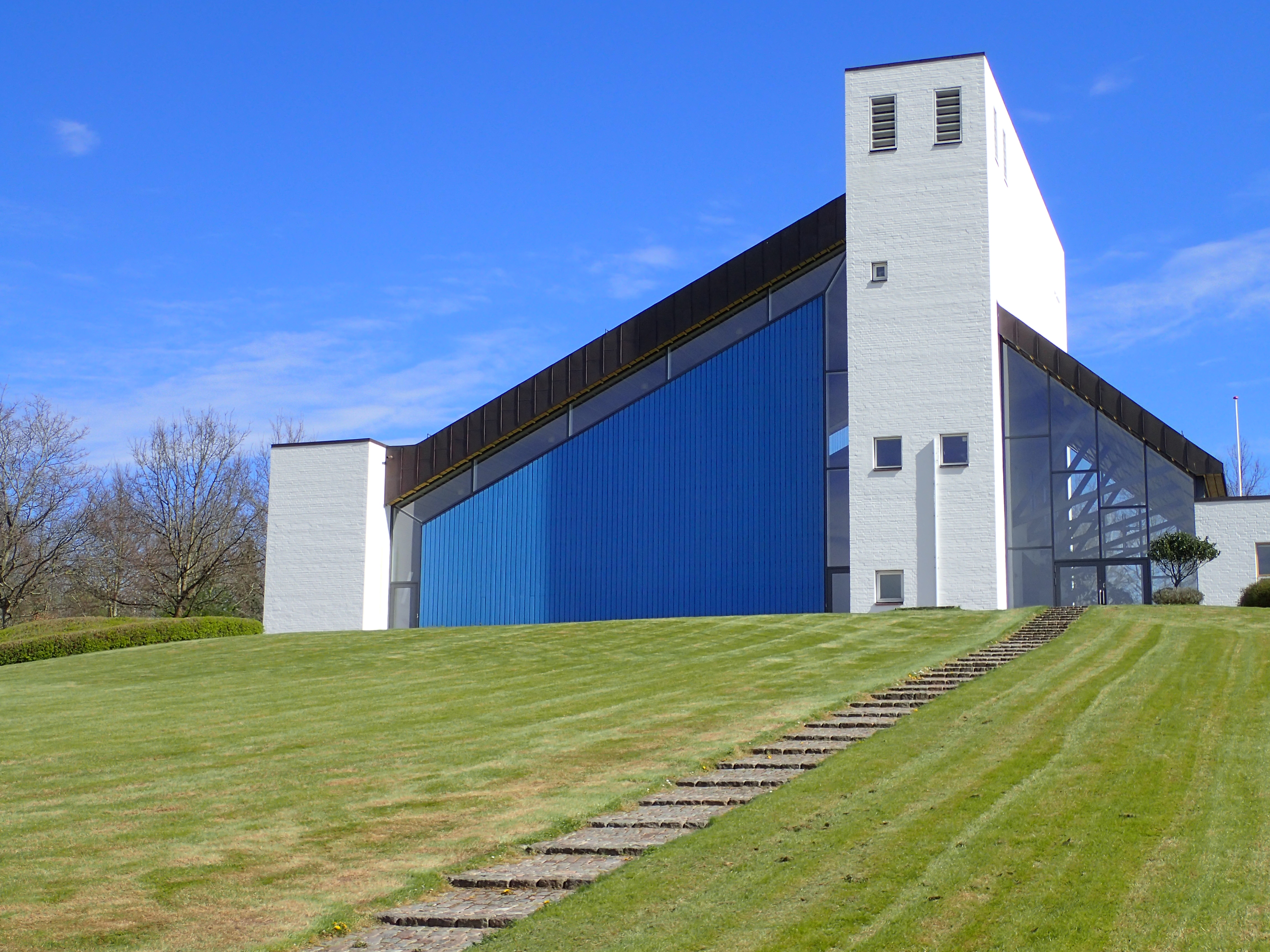
Skjoldhøj Church (1984)

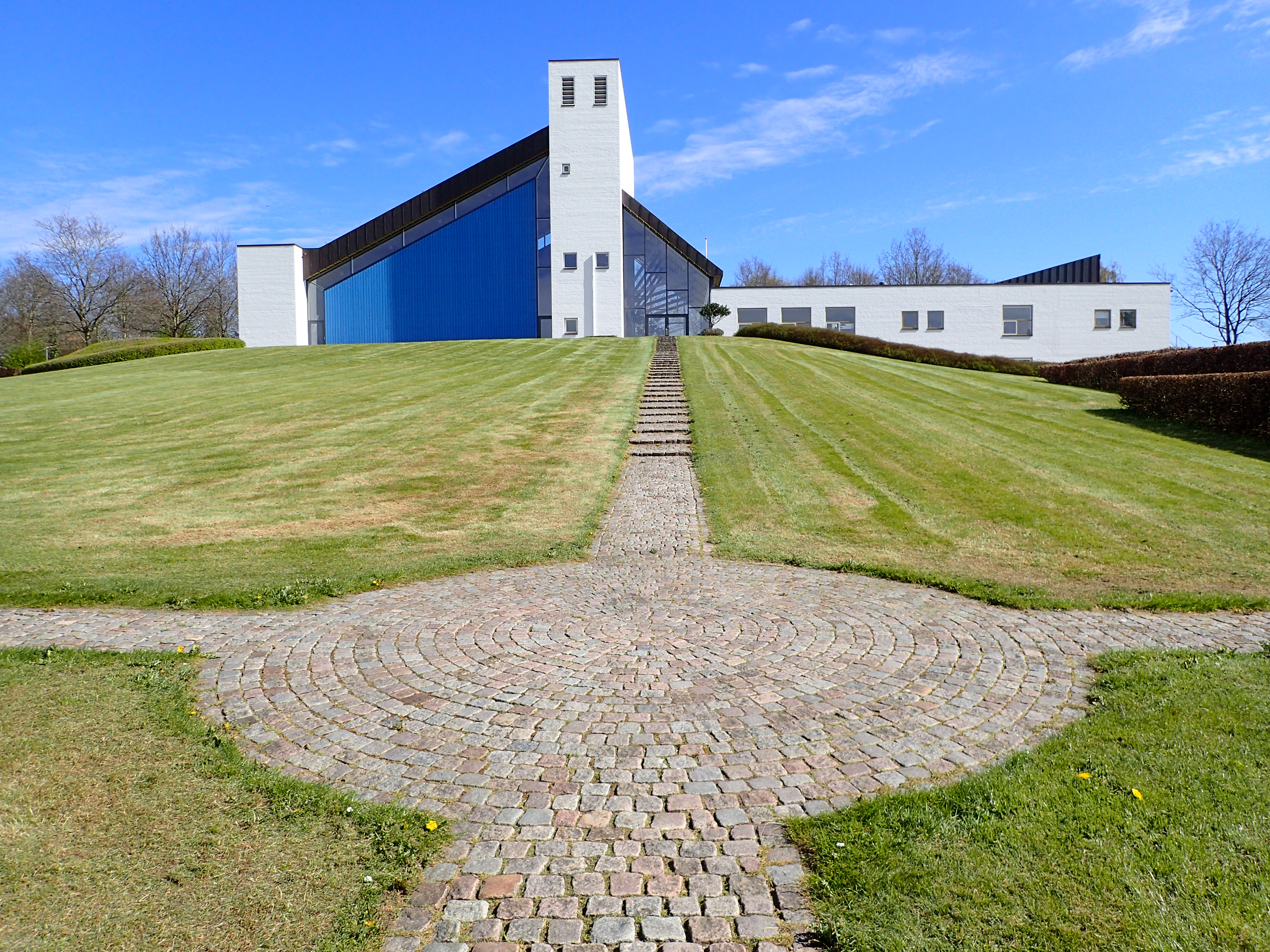

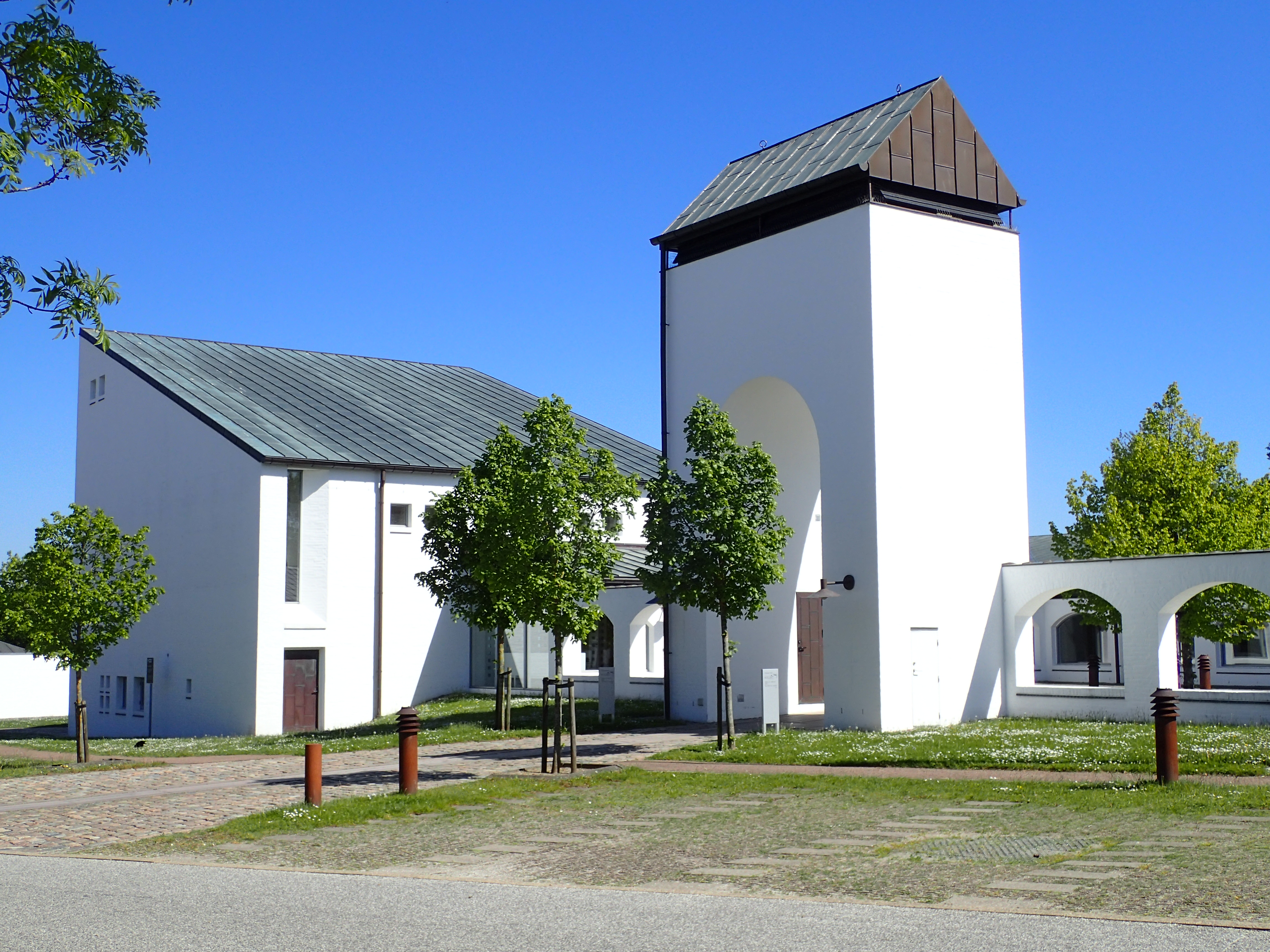
Skelager Church (1990)

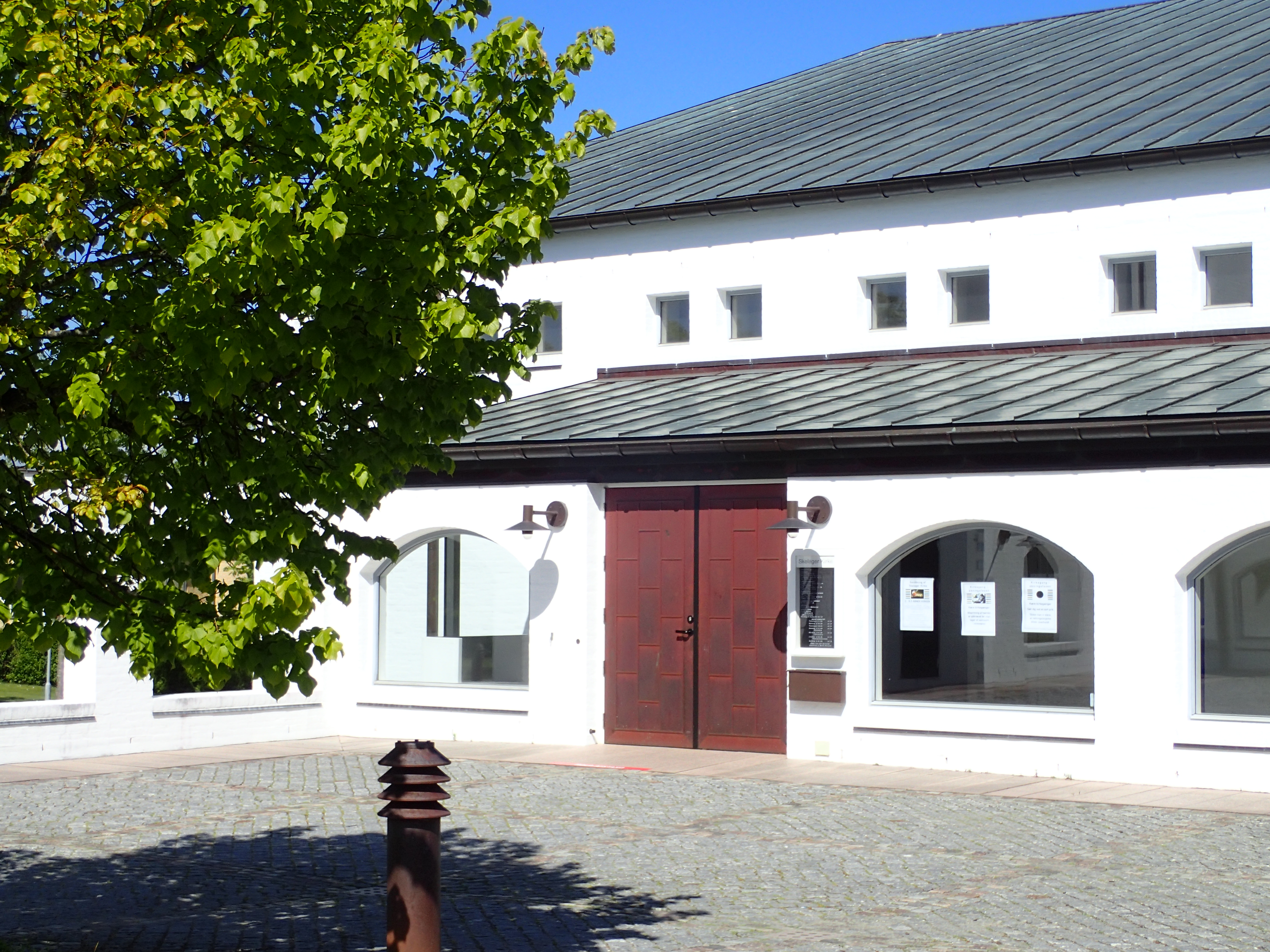

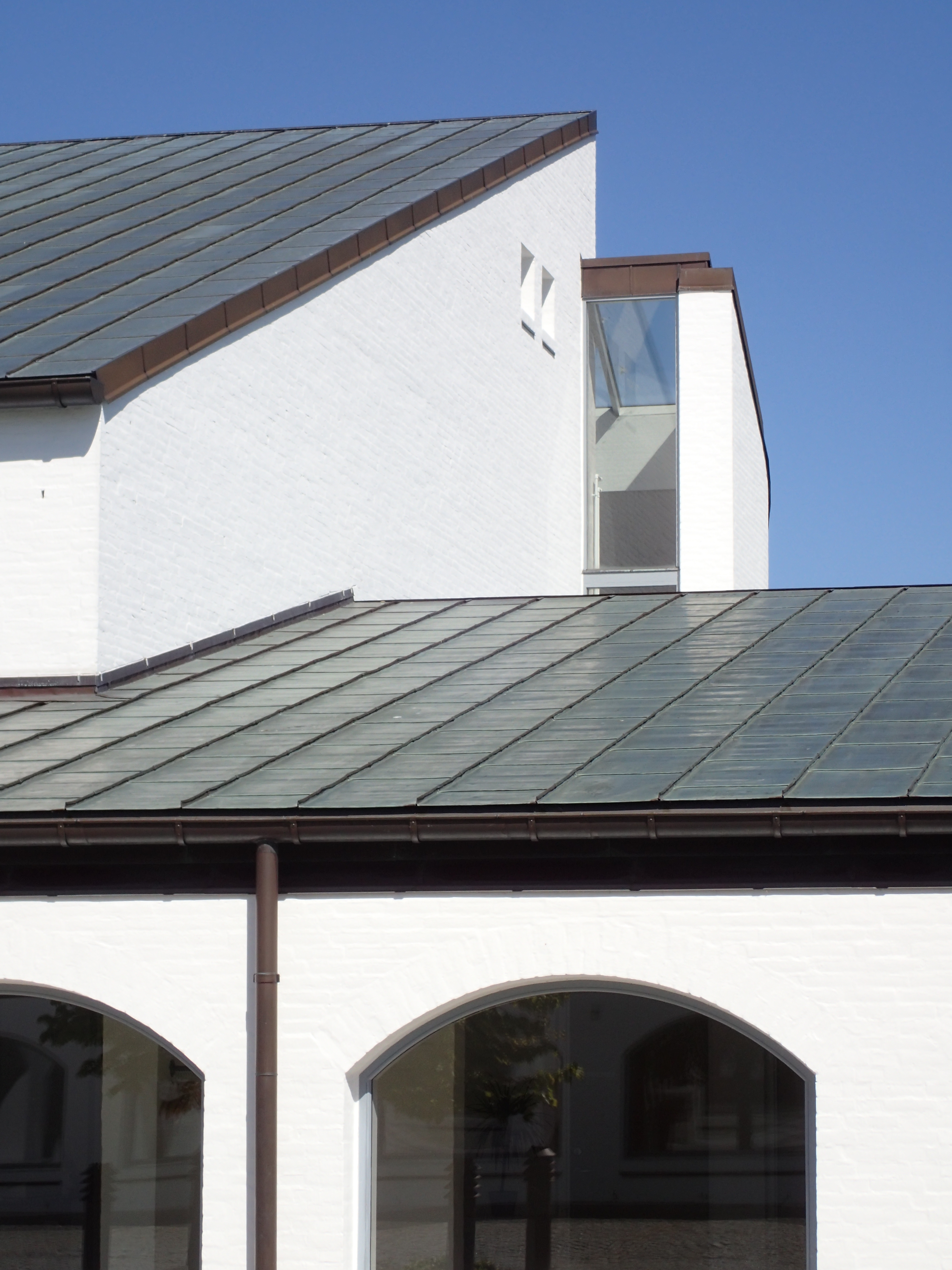

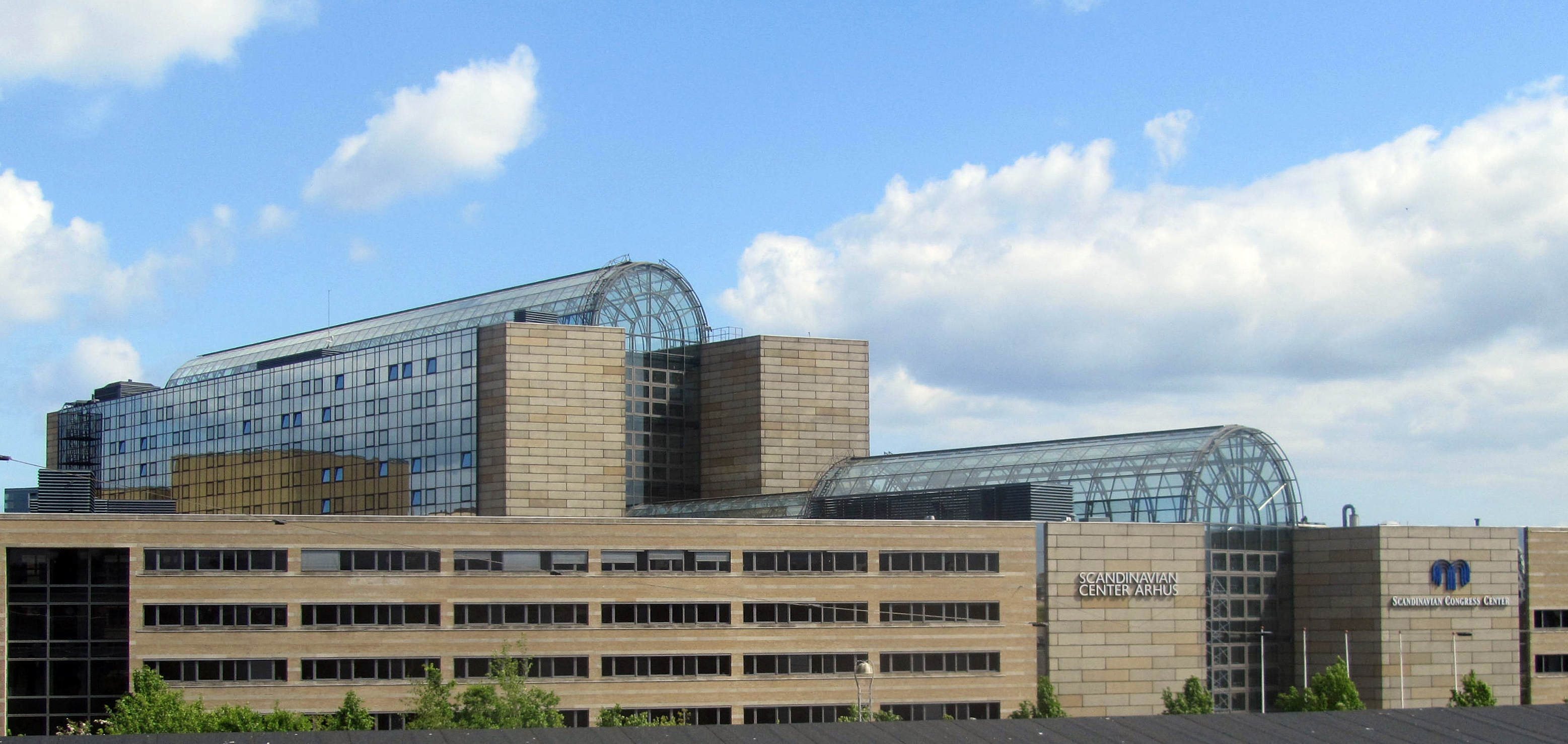
Scandinavian Center Aarhus (1995)

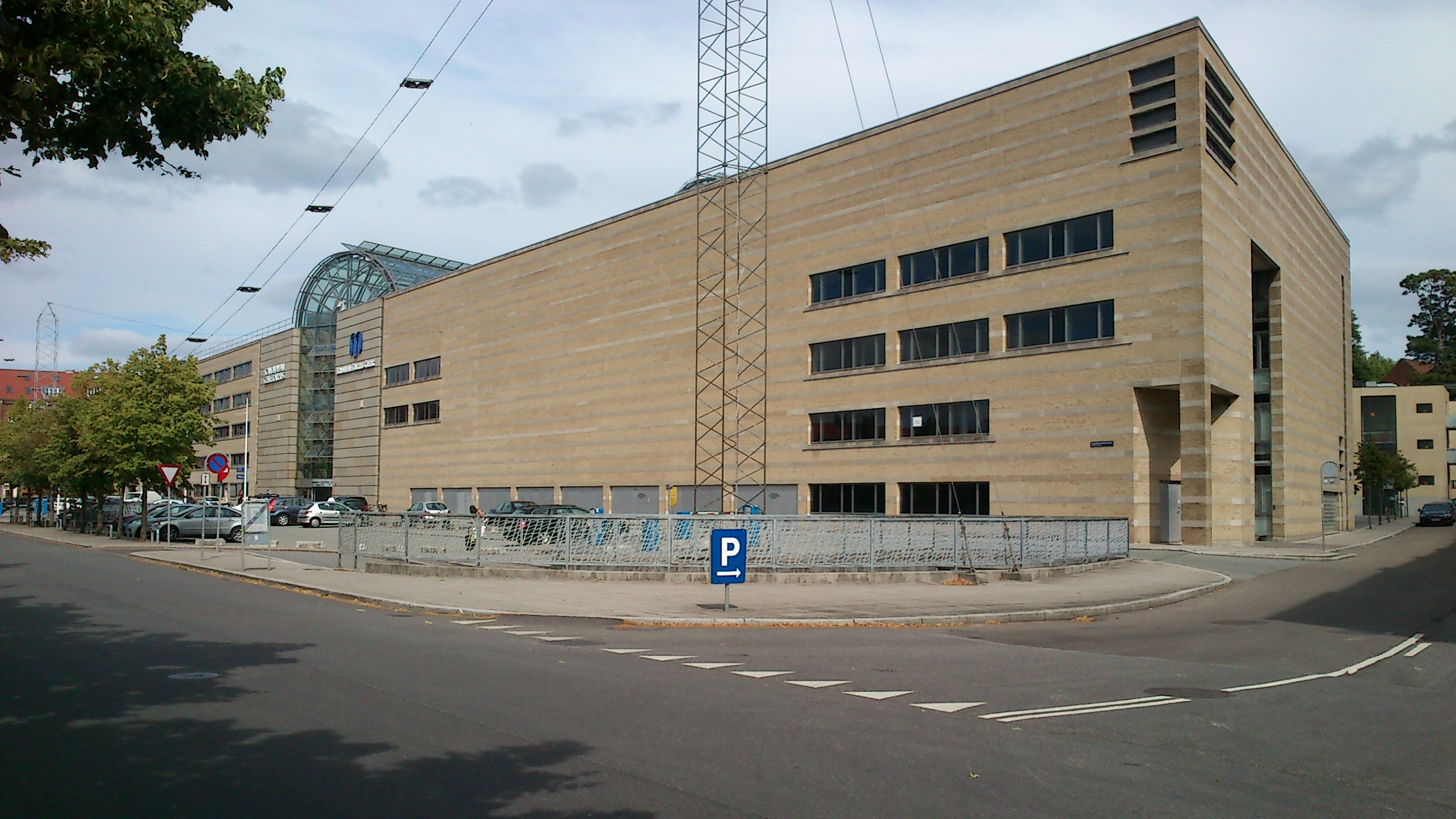

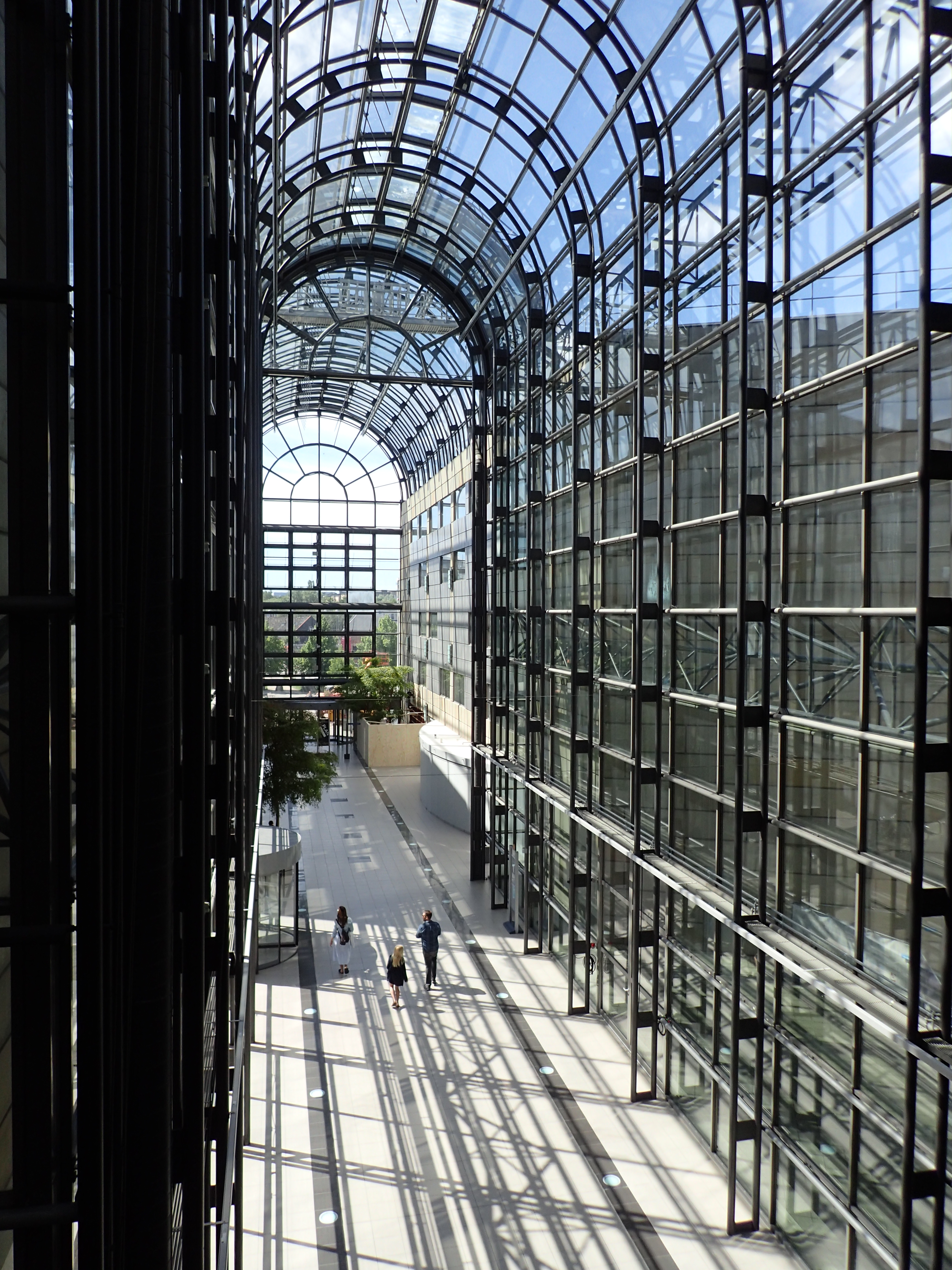

2000's

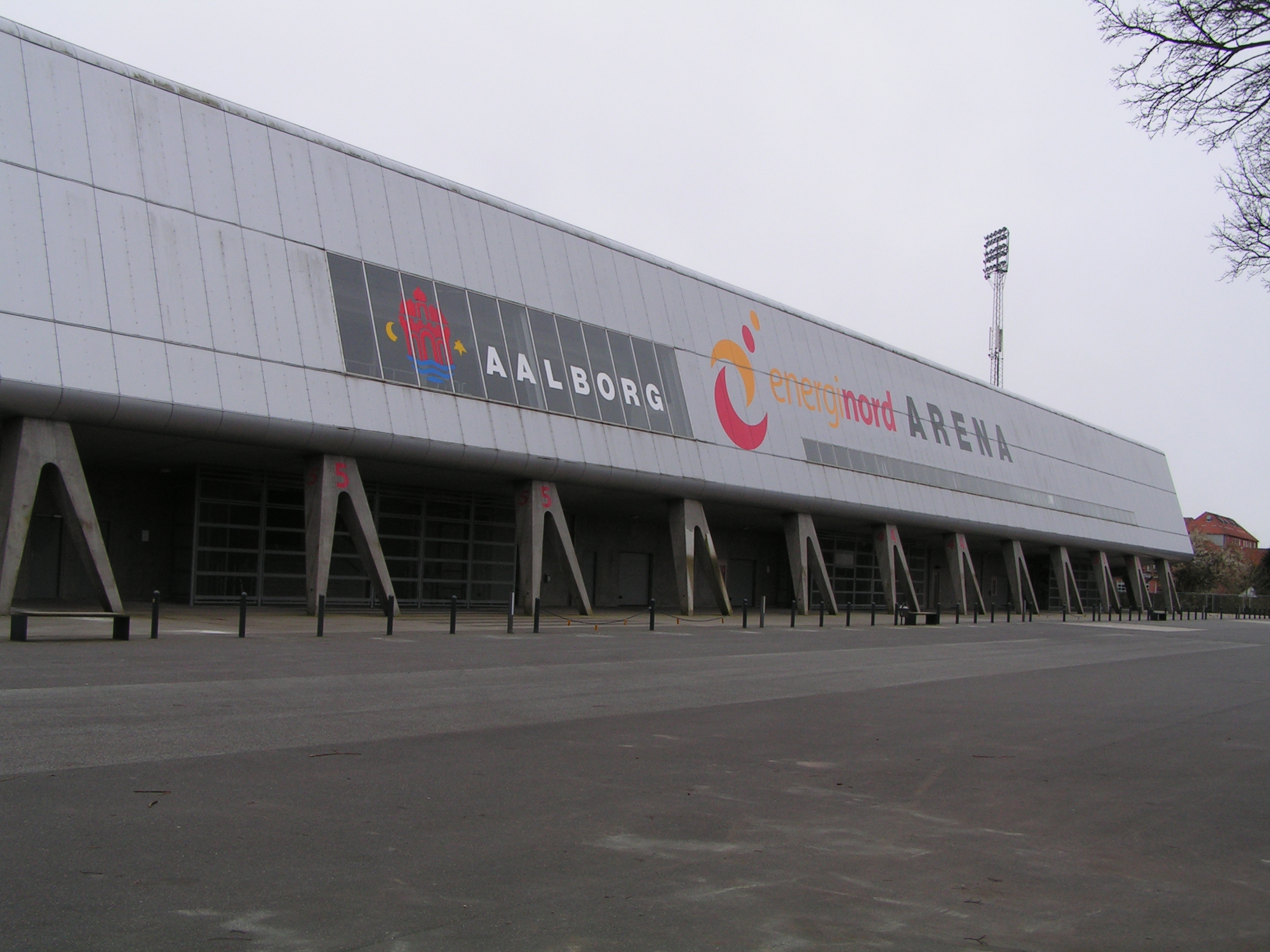
Aalborg Stadion (2002)

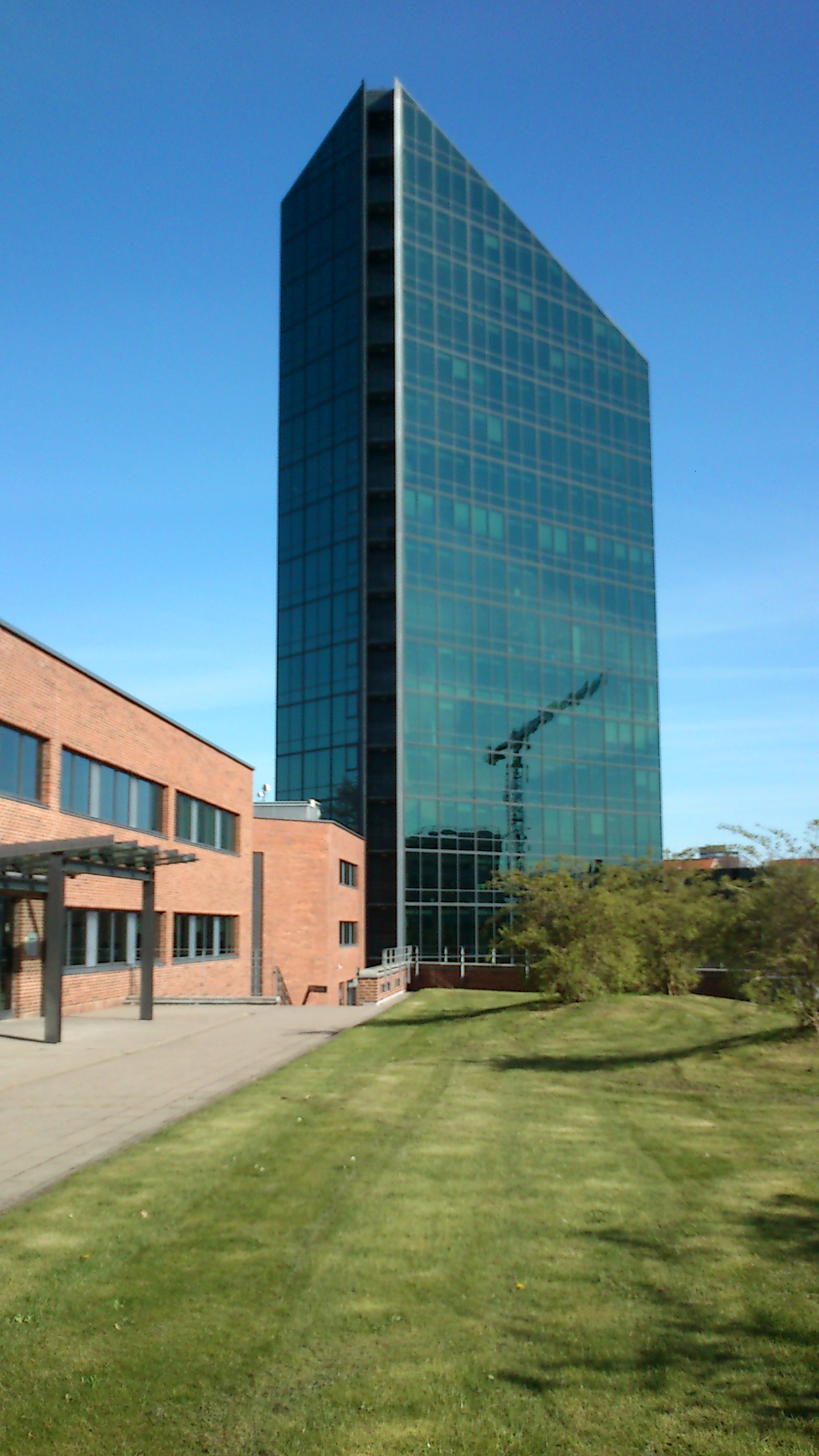
Prismet, offices (2002)

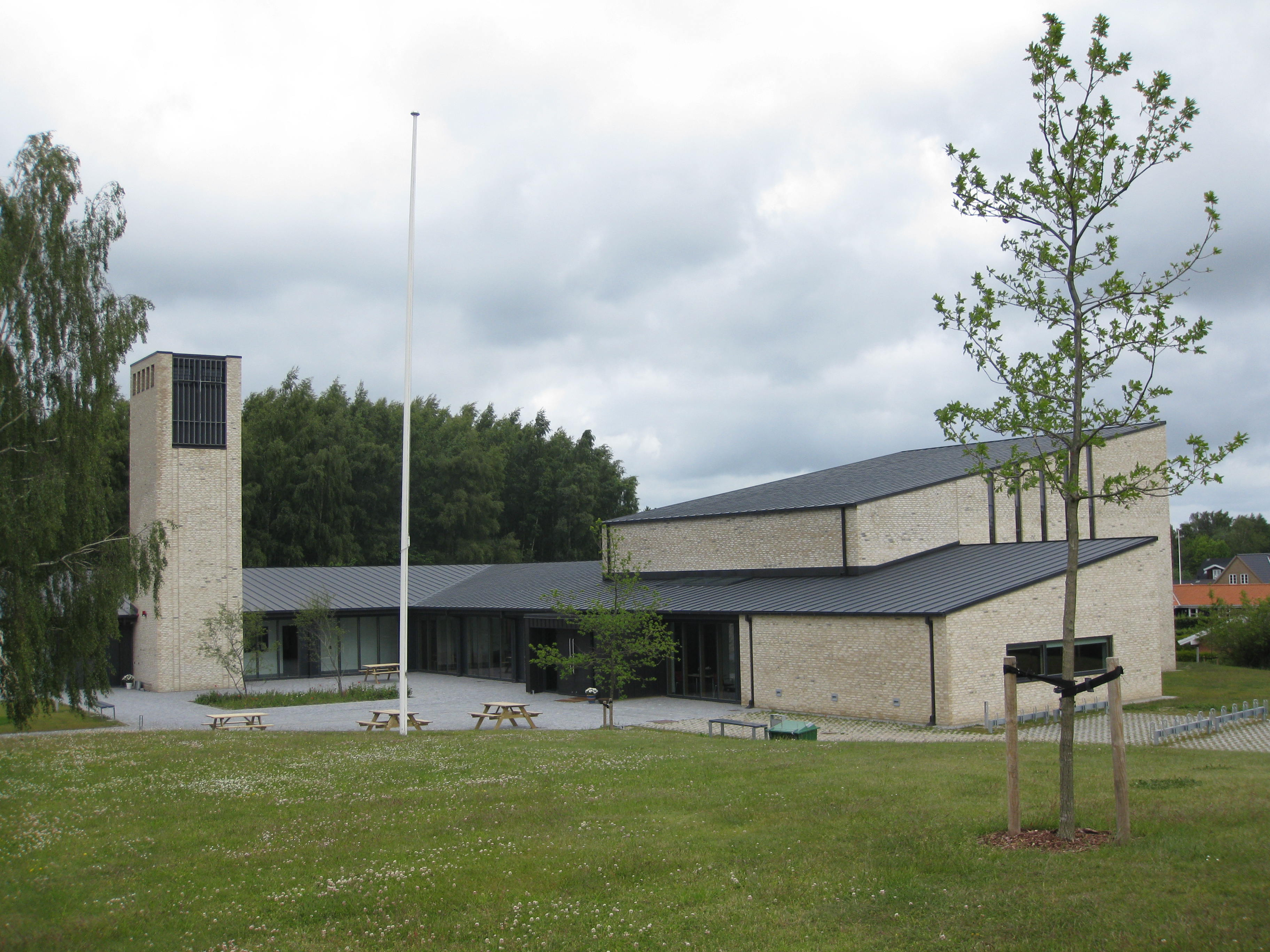
Grønnevang Church (2008)

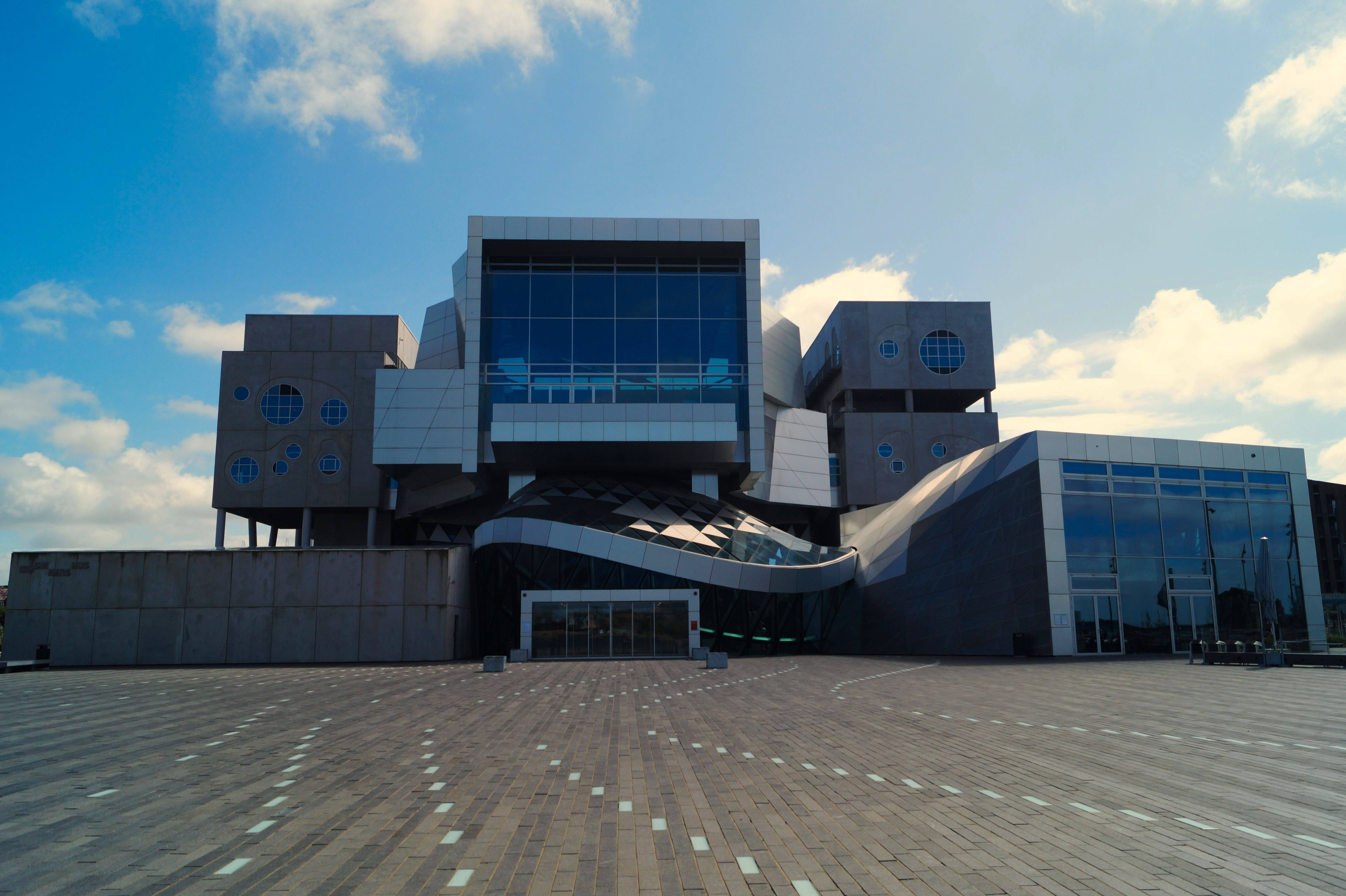
Musikkens Hus (2013)
