= Hotel Marselis =

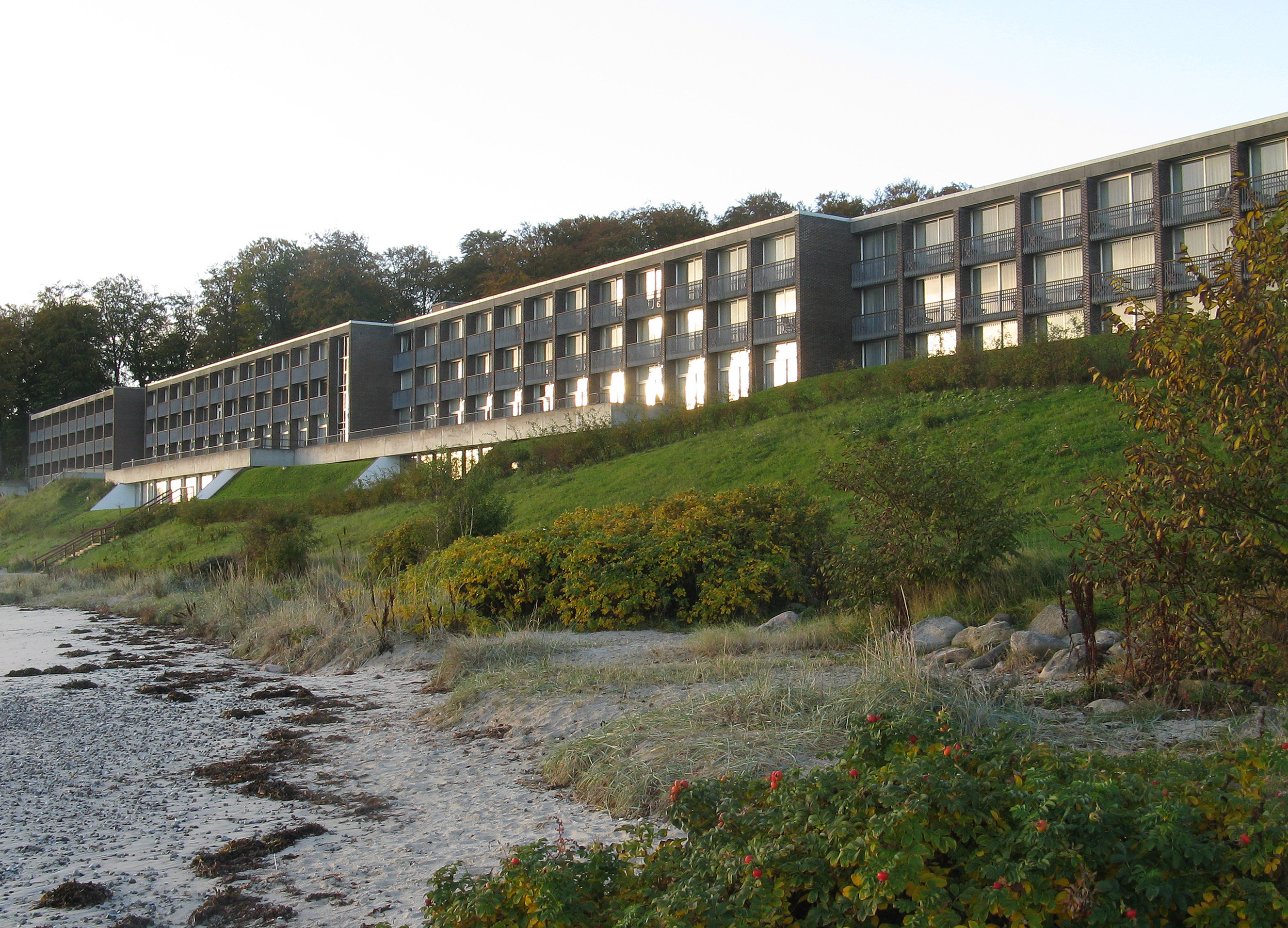
- Front facade of Hotel Marselis
- Interactive map of the Hotel Marselis area

General information
- Type: Hotel
- Architectural style: Brutalism
- Location: Aarhus, Denmark
- Coordinates: 56.1265°N 10.2150°E
- Completed: 1967
- Owner: Helnan International Hotels

Design and construction
- Architect: Friis & Moltke

Hotel Marselis or Marselis Hotel - Aarhus is a hotel in Aarhus, Denmark. It is located in the Marselisborg Forests, in the Højbjerg district. It overlooks the Bay of Aarhus from a prominent position on the coast. The hotel is owned by the company Helnan Hotels which also operates a hotel in Aalborg. The hotel includes 163 rooms and beyond common amenities also feature conference and meeting rooms. Marselis Hotel is a four star hotel (2016) and is member of the Danish hotel organization Horesta.

Marselis Hotel was the culmination of almost a century of efforts to have a hotel established in the Marselisborg Forests. In 1965 the local master mason Anker Jakobsen bought the half-timbered Frydenlund house which used to be home to the local park ranger. Jakobsen was deeply engaged in the project and demanded that all bricks be handmade rather than factory produced. The hotel was completed in 1967 and operated until 2001 when it was bought by the hotel chain Helnan International Hotels, founded by Enan Galaly. After 2001 the hotel faced a large renovation and expansion in a modern and maritime style.

== Architecture ==
Marselis Hotel has a unique location, very close to the shore, on a hill in a forest. The building is designed to take advantage of the location and surroundings, designed as a number of connected buildings with shifting heights. The buildings are dug into the hill it is constructed on so there are 3 floors on the side facing the coast but only two on the side facing the forest. The two top floors are designed with rooms for guests while the bottom floor is for restaurant and conference facilities. All guest rooms feature large windows facing the Bay of Aarhus. In contrast to the airy facade of the water-side, the land-side of the buildings have a closed-off appearance with small circular windows to the corridors and hallways. The main entrance is placed in a connecting building that connects the newer hotel to an older villa that now functions as offices. Originally the hotel consisted of 3 wings but since 2001 a fourth has been added.

The buildings are made of coffee-brown bricks, handmade so no two are alike, and the floor in the foyer is covered in ceramic tiles. The materials are symptomatic for the detailed workmanship and simple furnishings in one of the finest examples of Brutalist architecture in Denmark. The responsible architects was the architecture firm Friis & Moltke which has built a number of other brutalist structures in Aarhus.
