= Hotel Føroyar =

Hotel above the Faroese capital of Tórshavn

Coordinates: 62°00′47″N 6°47′57″W

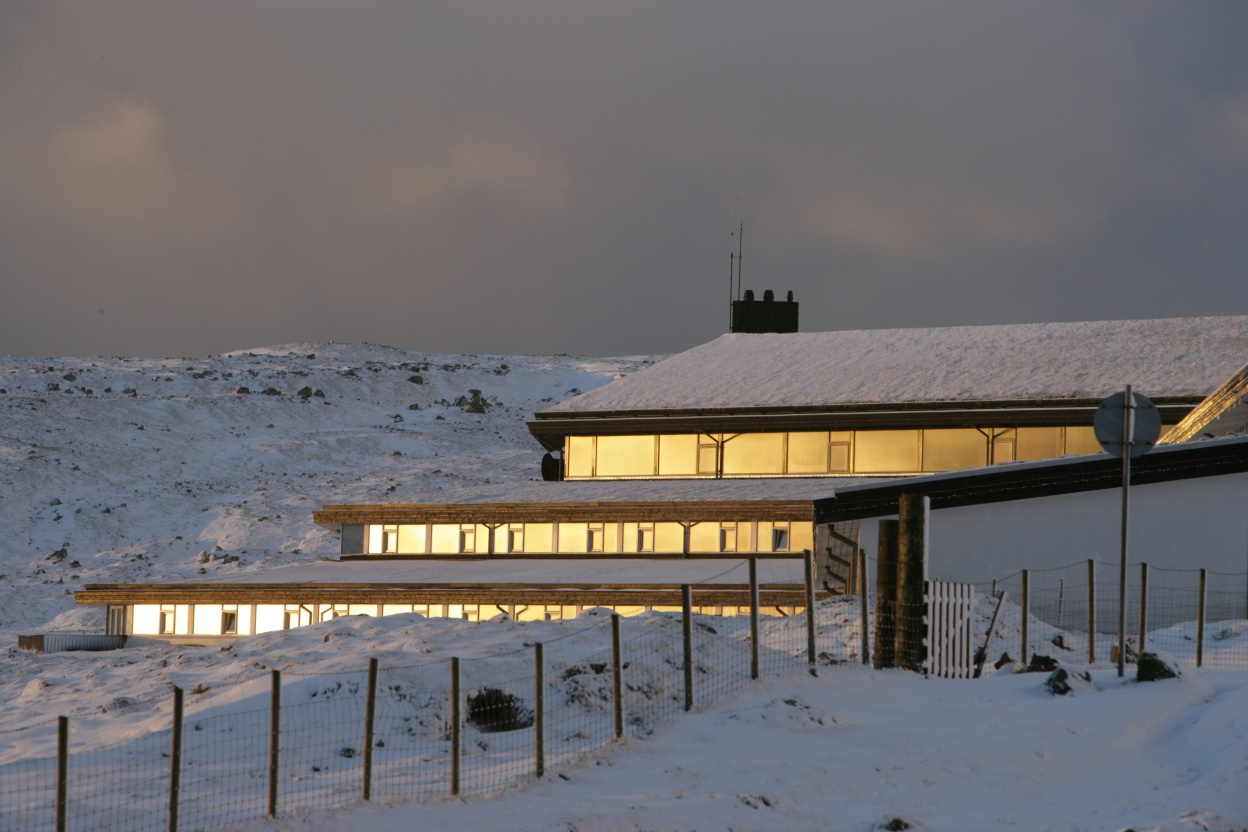
Hotel Føroyar

Hotel Føroyar (formerly Hotel Borg) is a four-star hotel above the Faroese capital of Tórshavn.

== Location ==
The elongated complex is perched on a hillside in the northwestern outskirts of Tórshavn on Highway 10 (Oyggjarvegur), about a 5-minute drive from the city centre. Many panoramic photographs of Tórshavn are taken from the hotel location, which provides a view of the entire area, with the island Nólsoy in the background, and the small forest of Viðarlundin í Kerjum below.

== History ==
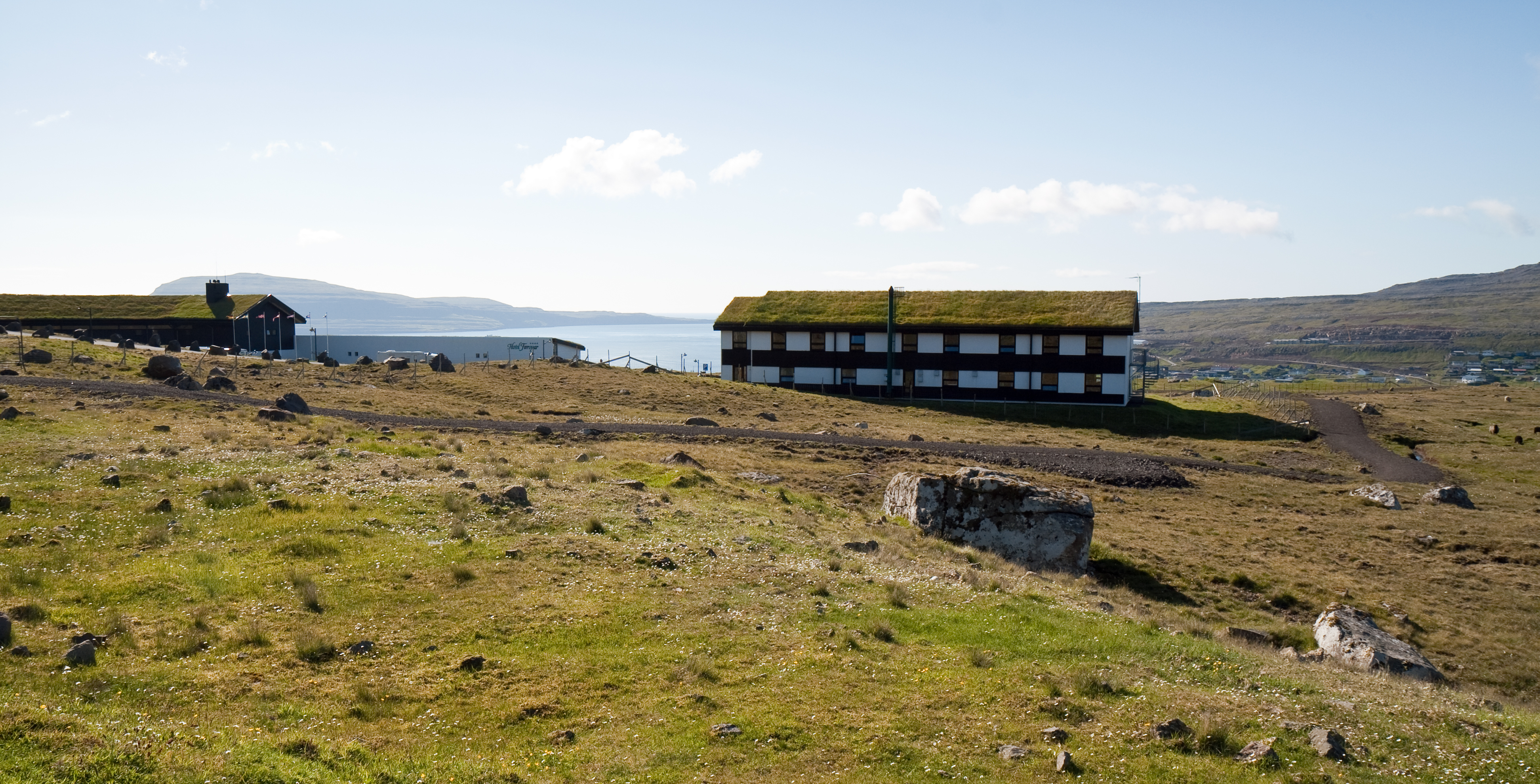
View of the Kerjalon Hostel with the hotel to the left

A hotel of the same name existed at least before 1968, when it was used for local conferences and meetings by the Viking Congress. The current hotel was established in May 1983 as Hotel Føroyar, later named Hotel Borg, when shipowner Jákup Joensen (also called Jákup í Lopra) bought the hotel. The distinct building, a flat construction with a traditional grass roof and 216 beds, was designed by architects Friis & Moltke from Denmark.

In 1991, the shipping company Smyril Line purchased the hotel and changed its name back to Hotel Føroyar. However the hotel was sold to a group of the hotel's staff in 2005, it was sold for the benefit of refinancing the modern ferry line Norröna. The hotel restaurant, Restaurant KOKS, run by chef Leif Sørensen, serves international and Faroese cuisine, and has been cited by the Nordic Council of Ministers as the "best restaurant on the Faroe Islands". The buffet of the restaurant regularly serves traditional Faroese meat dishes such as skerpikjøt (dried mutton), dried whale meat, dried fish and blubber. The hotel is also regularly used for local and international conferences and events conferences, particularly by organizations operating between the Nordic countries, and weddings. It also organizes horse riding trips into the countryside for its guests.
