= Scandinavian Center =

Convention center in Denmark

- Scandinavian Center Aarhus
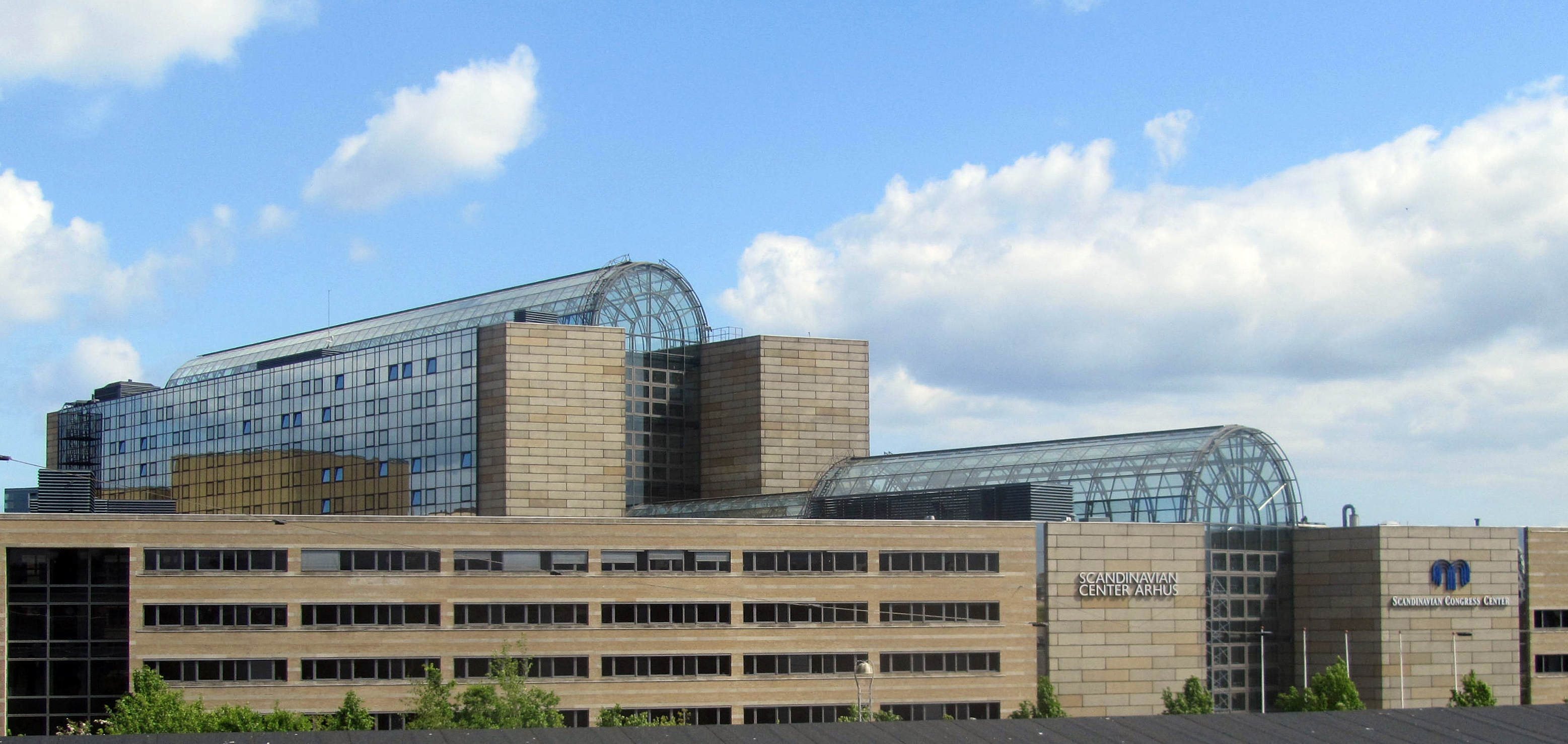
- Interactive map of the Scandinavian Center area

General information
- Type: Convention center
- Architectural style: Modern
- Location: Aarhus, Denmark, Margrethepladsen 2, 8000 Aarhus C
- Coordinates: 56.1527°N 10.1968°E
- Named for: Scandinavia
- Completed: 1995

Technical details
- Floor area: 75,000 m^{2} (810,000 sq ft)

Design and construction
- Architect: Friis & Moltke

Scandinavian Center

Scandinavian Center is a convention center in Aarhus, Denmark situated in the Midtbyen neighborhood at the city square of Margrethepladsen. Scandinavian Center was finished in 1995 by designs of the architect practice Friis & Moltke in a modern style. Today, the building is privately owned and used for various activities such a conventions, hotel and businesses. The building is a well-known landmark in central Aarhus, situated in Eckersbergsgade.

== Architecture ==
The convention center is situated on hilly terrain between the Aarhus Concert Hall and Sonnesgade at Godsbanen. The building is designed as a long glass covered promenade that covers the 11-metre (36 ft) height differential on the property. The central stairway runs obliquely through the building and includes walkways, elevators and greenery. The glass roof is supported by an arched pipe-construction. Materials for structure include yellow brick, black marble, granite, aluminum and jatoba for the floors.

The project was completed by entrepreneur Per Aarsleff A/S and the cooperative Jord & Beton Amba by designs of the architects T. Skovgaard and Friis & Moltke. The landscape architect Schønherr designed the outdoors areas.

== Background ==
In the late 1980s, Aarhus city council decided to place a new convention and hotel center next to the Aarhus Concert Hall. The project was meant to revitalize the area around the concert hall, the river valley by Aarhus River and the old residential neighborhood Mølleengen but large parts of the project was never completed. Not until 15 to 20 years later, after the construction of the ARoS Aarhus Art Museum and the start of the redevelopment of Godsbanen into a culture center, did the area become more used. The current redevelopment of CeresByen north of the center is believed to finally turn this area of the central city into a more active location.

== Gallery ==
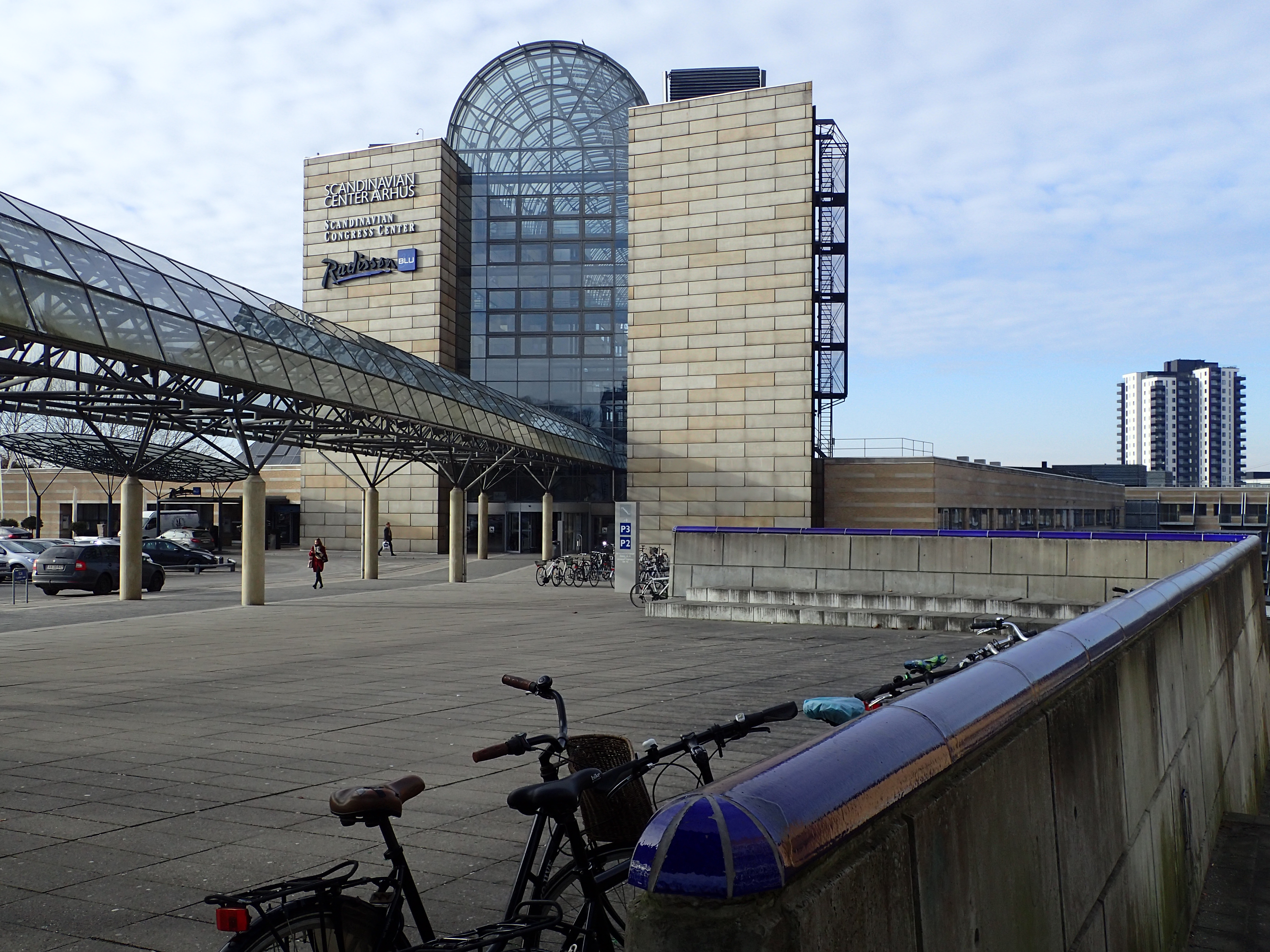
West entrance

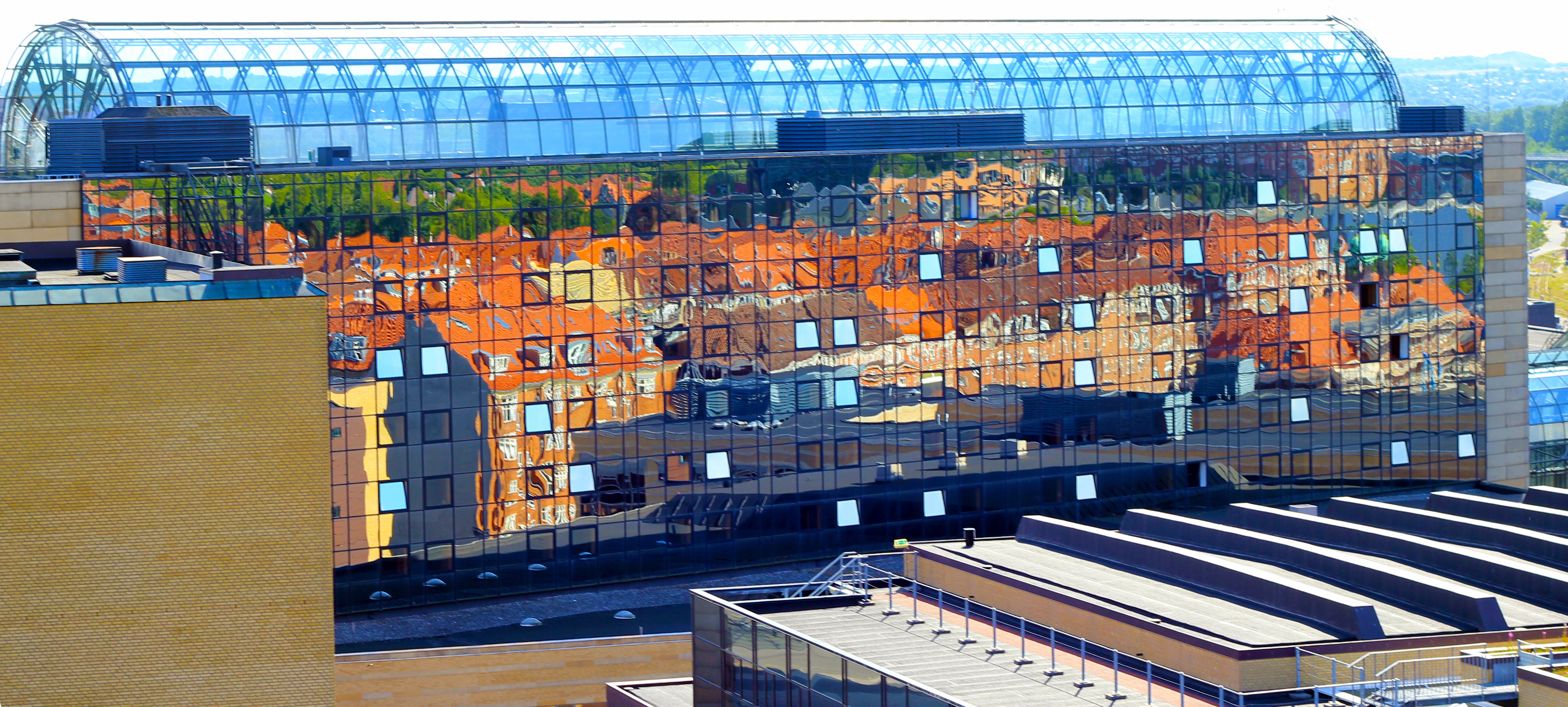
The glass facade

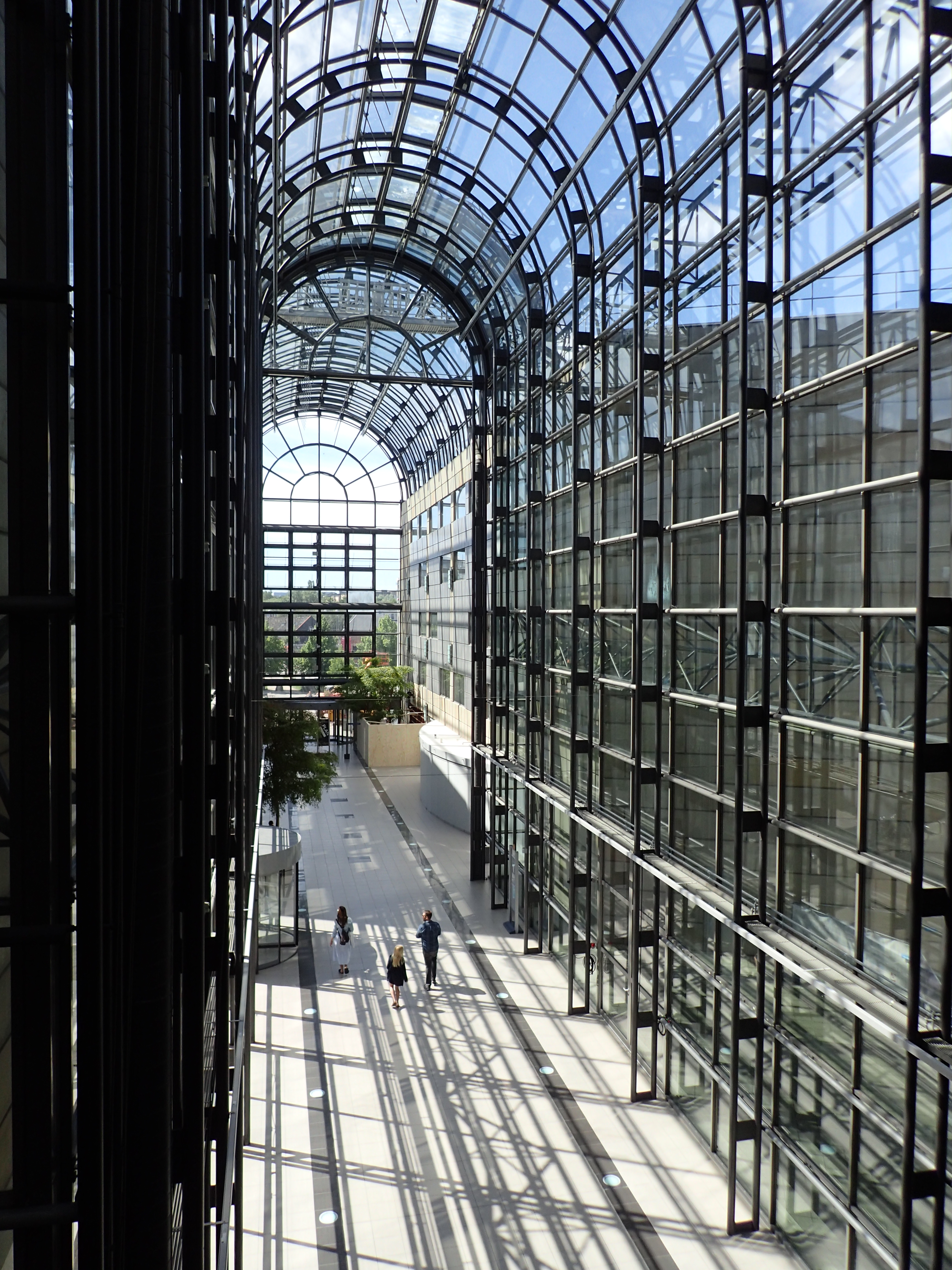
The arcade

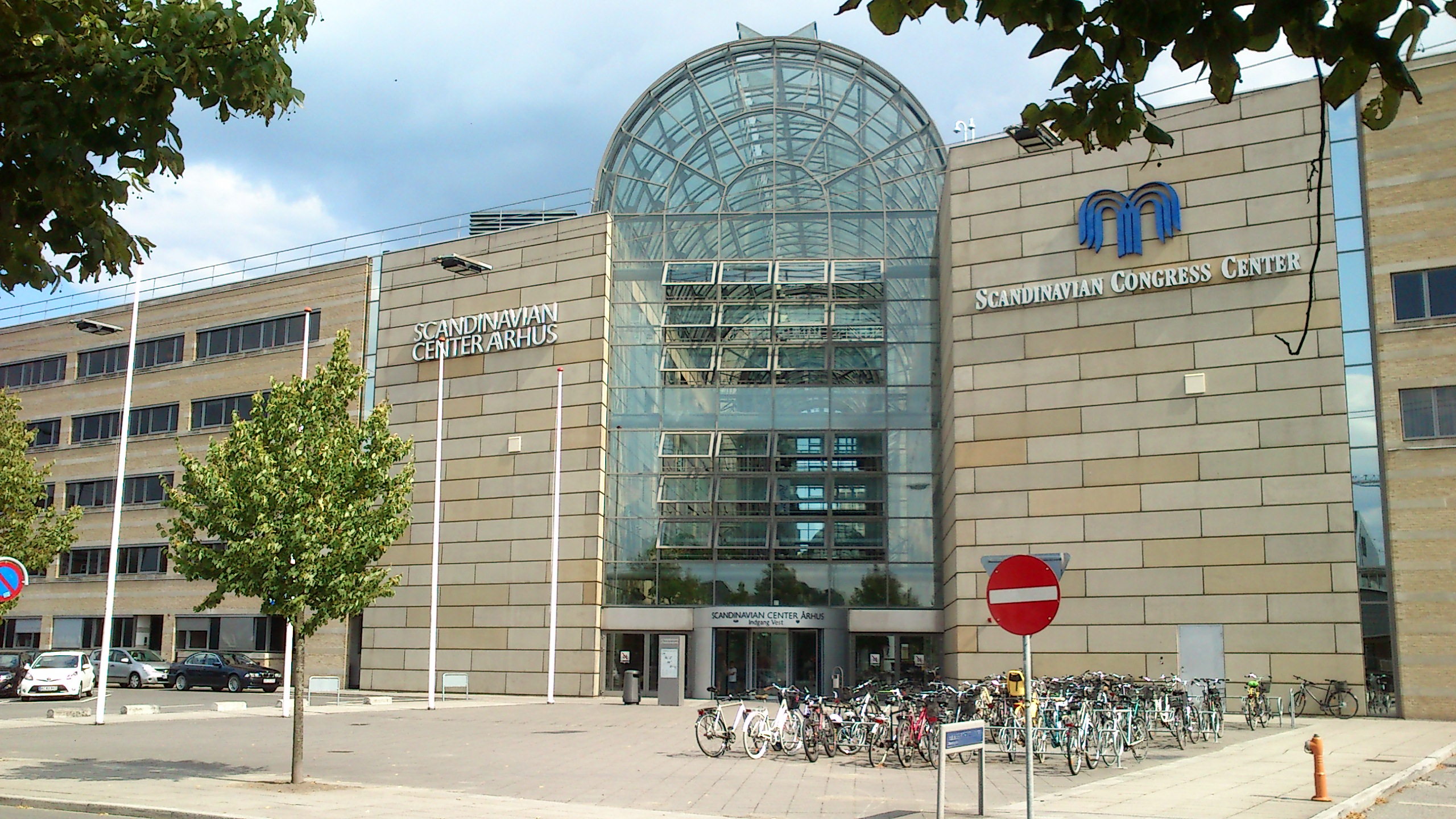
East entrance

== See also ==
- Architecture of Aarhus
