= 2025 Aarhus municipal election =

Municipal election in Denmark

- 18 November 2025

All 31 seats to the Aarhus municipal council 16 seats needed for a majority
- Turnout: 219,139 (71.6%) ▲3.3%
	First party	Second party	Third party
	A	F	V
Party	Social Democrats	Green Left	Venstre
Last election	10 seats, 28.7%	4 seats, 13.7%	4 seats, 11.9%
Seats won	10	5	4
Seat change	0	▲1	0
Popular vote	65,864	32,879	25,512
Percentage	30.5%	15.2%	11.8%
Swing	▲1.8%	▲1.5%	▼0.0%
	Fourth party	Fifth party	Sixth party
	Ø	C	B
Party	Red-Green Alliance	Conservatives	Social Liberals
Last election	3 seats, 9.9%	5 seats, 14.6%	3 seats, 9.2%
Seats won	3	3	2
Seat change	0	▼2	▼1
Popular vote	18,691	18,075	15,136
Percentage	8.7%	8.4%	7.0%
Swing	▼1.2%	▼6.2%	▼2.2%
	Seventh party	Eighth party	Ninth party
	I	Æ	O
Party	Liberal Alliance	Denmark Democrats	Danish People's Party
Last election	0 seats, 1.8%	Did not stand	1 seat, 2.7%
Seats won	2	1	1
Seat change	▲2	▲1	0
Popular vote	11,815	8,673	7,548
Percentage	5.5%	4.0%	3.5%
Swing	▲3.7%	New	▲0.8%
Mayor before election
Anders Winnerskjold
Social Democrats
Mayor after election
Anders Winnerskjold
Social Democrats

The 2025 Aarhus Municipal election was held on 18 November 2025, to elect the 31 members to sit in the regional council for the Aarhus Municipal council, in the period of 2026 to 2029. Anders Winnerskjold would win the mayoral position.

== Background ==
Following the 2021 election, Jacob Bundsgaard from Social Democrats became mayor for his fourth term, having taken over from Nicolai Wammen in 2011. However, Bundsgaard stepped down as mayor in October 2024, ending his 13-years as mayor. Anders Winnerskjold, would take the position as mayor following this.

== Electoral system ==
For elections to Danish municipalities, a number varying from 9 to 55 are chosen to be elected to the municipal council. The seats are then allocated using the D'Hondt method and a closed list proportional representation. Aarhus Municipality had 31 seats in 2025.

== Electoral alliances ==
=== Electoral Alliance 1 ===
Party		Political alignment
B	Social Liberals	Centre to Centre-left
K	Christian Democrats	Centre to Centre-right
M	Moderates	Centre to Centre-right
T	BorgerTinget	Local politics

=== Electoral Alliance 2 ===
Party		Political alignment
C	Conservatives	Centre-right
I	Liberal Alliance	Centre-right to Right-wing
N	Nej til privatisering af kommunale veje	Local politics
O	Danish People's Party	Right-wing to Far-right
V	Venstre	Centre-right
Æ	Denmark Democrats	Right-wing to Far-right

=== Electoral Alliance 3 ===
Party		Political alignment
F	Green Left	Centre-left to Left-wing
Ø	Red-Green Alliance	Left-wing to Far-Left
Å	The Alternative	Centre-left to Left-wing

=== Electoral Alliance 4 ===
Party		Political alignment
Q	Independent Greens	Left-wing
R	Kommunistisk Parti	Far-Left

== Results by polling station ==
Division	A	B	C	F	I	J	K	M	N	O	Q	R	T	V	Æ	Ø	Å	Others
Division	%	%	%	%	%	%	%	%	%	%	%	%	%	%	%	%	%	%
Frederiksbjerghallerne	31.7	7.7	9.3	14.6	6.3	0.0	0.1	1.8	0.1	2.1	0.1	0.1	0.5	11.0	1.7	9.3	3.4	0.2
Folkehuset Ankersgade	32.8	6.4	7.6	16.0	5.2	0.1	0.3	1.6	0.0	3.4	0.3	0.1	0.2	8.6	2.6	11.6	3.0	0.3
Rundhøjhallen, Holme	29.8	5.3	10.9	14.9	4.5	0.1	0.2	1.3	0.4	4.4	0.1	0.2	0.2	13.0	4.4	8.1	1.6	0.4
Kragelundskolen, Højbjerg	27.9	9.6	9.7	14.7	5.0	0.3	0.2	1.0	0.4	3.2	0.1	0.1	0.4	13.7	3.0	7.6	2.8	0.3
Tranbjerg Skole	32.0	4.0	7.6	13.0	4.6	0.1	0.2	1.8	1.5	5.4	0.1	0.2	0.1	15.5	8.9	4.0	0.8	0.1
Rosenvangskolen, Viby J	31.0	8.6	10.2	14.9	5.2	0.1	0.2	1.7	0.2	2.9	0.3	0.1	0.6	11.7	3.2	6.7	2.0	0.4
Viby Hallen	33.1	7.2	8.1	13.7	4.6	0.1	0.1	1.8	0.4	5.1	0.4	0.3	0.1	8.5	4.6	9.3	2.1	0.4
Beder Skole	35.5	3.8	8.4	18.6	3.3	0.0	0.1	1.6	0.9	3.3	0.0	0.2	0.3	11.4	3.9	6.3	2.2	0.2
DOKK1, Aarhus C	27.4	8.3	8.5	16.0	7.5	0.1	0.2	1.5	0.1	1.9	0.1	0.2	0.1	11.8	1.2	11.3	3.9	0.1
Malling Skole	38.0	4.0	8.2	14.2	5.1	0.1	0.1	1.7	0.3	4.2	0.0	0.1	0.2	10.1	5.0	6.5	2.1	0.2
Mårslet Hallen	33.2	5.2	10.5	16.0	5.3	0.2	0.3	1.4	0.8	2.7	0.1	0.0	0.2	13.9	3.4	4.9	1.7	0.2
Solbjergskolen	30.4	3.5	9.8	10.9	4.7	0.0	0.1	1.5	1.5	4.9	0.1	0.2	0.1	18.7	8.1	4.1	1.3	0.2
Generationernes Hus, Aarhus Ø	24.1	5.9	10.3	10.4	16.1	0.0	0.1	2.3	0.0	2.8	0.0	0.0	0.3	18.1	3.9	4.0	1.4	0.2
Ormslev Præstegård	29.5	5.4	10.8	15.7	4.9	0.2	0.2	1.3	0.0	2.4	0.0	0.0	0.0	12.7	8.8	7.1	0.9	0.2
Hasselager Hallen	32.8	4.5	13.1	11.9	4.4	0.1	0.2	1.5	0.5	8.0	0.2	0.1	0.2	8.6	8.4	4.3	0.9	0.3
Højvangskolen, Stavtrup	34.1	5.2	9.6	16.2	4.1	0.1	0.0	1.4	0.5	4.1	0.2	0.0	0.1	10.1	5.1	7.4	1.6	0.1
Folkestedet, Aarhus C	31.9	7.7	10.3	12.0	8.9	0.0	0.1	2.0	0.0	1.8	0.1	0.1	0.1	13.6	1.2	7.9	2.2	0.2
Aarhus Rådhus	30.8	7.9	8.2	14.6	7.0	0.0	0.1	1.5	0.1	2.0	0.1	0.1	0.2	12.0	1.2	10.2	3.8	0.2
Gammelgaardsskolen, Åbyhøj	36.7	7.0	8.5	17.5	3.4	0.1	0.2	1.6	0.2	2.8	0.3	0.0	0.1	8.8	3.0	7.3	2.3	0.2
Hasle Skole	32.6	9.0	7.0	16.6	3.9	0.1	0.8	1.4	0.5	3.1	0.5	0.2	0.1	7.6	2.7	11.6	2.2	0.2
Brabrand Hallen	30.5	6.8	10.9	17.5	4.2	0.0	0.3	1.3	1.2	3.5	0.2	0.2	0.1	10.5	3.9	6.7	1.8	0.3
Globus 1, Brabrand	26.9	19.4	4.7	9.6	2.2	0.1	0.8	1.0	0.4	2.2	2.0	0.4	0.1	4.4	1.3	22.2	2.0	0.4
Skjoldhøjskolen, Tilst	30.2	8.0	6.5	13.0	3.6	0.0	0.7	1.4	0.8	4.7	0.9	0.4	0.1	8.5	7.1	12.0	1.8	0.2
VIA University College, Aarhus C	32.6	7.1	10.3	11.6	8.8	0.1	0.2	1.9	0.0	2.9	0.1	0.1	0.1	12.9	1.5	7.5	2.0	0.1
TST Aktiv-Center, Tilst	33.1	8.6	6.1	10.5	4.0	0.1	0.7	1.7	0.6	6.3	0.8	0.3	0.2	8.4	7.0	9.9	1.5	0.2
Næshøjhallen, Harlev	32.9	4.3	8.2	11.7	5.7	0.0	0.2	3.0	0.8	5.7	0.3	0.1	0.2	13.5	8.1	3.8	1.2	0.2
Borum Forsamlingshus	24.7	4.9	2.9	17.7	3.1	0.0	0.4	1.3	2.0	6.1	0.0	0.0	0.0	11.4	13.0	8.5	3.8	0.0
Sabro-Korsvejskolen, Sabro	33.3	4.5	7.6	12.2	4.8	0.2	0.1	1.4	0.9	7.2	0.4	0.1	0.2	11.0	10.0	4.9	0.9	0.2
Samsøgades Skole, Aarhus C	28.4	9.0	6.5	19.4	4.9	0.1	0.1	1.2	0.0	1.6	0.2	0.4	0.1	9.5	0.9	13.6	3.9	0.2
Skovvangskolen, Aarhus N	29.5	8.1	7.2	20.1	4.9	0.1	0.1	1.1	0.1	2.5	0.3	0.2	0.1	7.9	1.9	12.2	3.6	0.2
Møllevangskolen, Aarhus V	30.0	7.6	7.5	17.7	4.7	0.0	0.2	1.4	0.1	3.5	0.2	0.4	0.2	9.0	1.9	12.4	3.0	0.3
Lisbjergskolen	29.5	6.1	5.8	18.9	6.3	0.1	0.5	1.9	0.4	3.9	0.2	0.1	1.0	9.5	3.6	9.2	2.8	0.2
Bellevuehallerne, Risskov	27.4	6.5	12.1	14.0	7.5	0.1	0.1	1.4	0.4	2.4	0.1	0.0	0.1	17.7	3.0	5.0	2.2	0.2
Lystrup Idrætscenter	28.5	4.1	7.2	17.6	3.8	0.1	0.4	1.3	2.4	3.6	0.1	0.1	0.1	11.2	12.7	5.4	1.3	0.1
Virupskolen, Hjortshøj	23.8	2.2	3.9	37.3	1.8	0.1	0.1	0.6	0.5	2.7	0.0	0.1	0.0	11.9	4.7	8.0	2.0	0.1
Sølystskolen, Egå	30.5	4.1	11.8	12.1	6.6	0.0	0.2	1.5	0.2	4.4	0.1	0.1	0.1	18.0	5.1	3.8	1.0	0.2
Skæring Skole	26.5	4.0	9.8	10.5	5.9	0.0	0.2	1.4	0.1	4.8	0.1	0.0	0.1	25.5	6.5	3.1	1.5	0.1
Midtpunktet - Skødstrup Idræts- og Kulturcenter	26.3	3.7	7.0	15.8	5.1	0.1	0.1	1.2	0.1	3.2	0.1	0.1	0.2	23.4	8.4	3.7	1.2	0.3
Folkehuset Trige	33.5	4.7	7.1	11.5	5.0	0.1	0.6	1.2	0.1	6.0	0.7	0.3	0.1	11.0	10.3	6.7	0.9	0.1
Spørring Fælleshus	27.4	4.9	11.9	9.7	3.7	0.1	0.7	0.6	0.7	6.1	0.0	0.1	0.0	15.4	12.9	4.3	1.4	0.0
Hårup Hallen	27.7	2.8	4.3	14.7	2.9	0.0	0.2	0.8	0.2	6.3	0.2	0.0	0.0	24.7	9.5	4.4	1.0	0.3
Vejlby-Risskov Hallen	31.0	7.7	6.7	18.0	5.1	0.1	0.5	1.6	0.1	3.4	0.1	0.2	0.1	8.9	2.4	11.4	2.5	0.2
Søndervangskolen, Viby J	31.0	22.6	3.7	7.4	3.6	0.1	0.1	1.6	0.1	5.3	0.9	0.2	0.2	4.8	3.2	13.7	1.3	0.2
FrydenlundHUSET, Aarhus V	27.9	12.6	5.5	16.6	3.1	0.1	0.3	1.7	0.1	3.4	0.9	0.5	0.1	5.8	2.3	16.2	2.6	0.3
Åby Hallen	35.9	7.1	6.2	14.8	5.5	0.0	0.2	1.6	0.1	3.2	0.2	0.1	0.1	9.9	2.4	10.2	2.2	0.2
Ellevangskolen, Risskov	30.8	5.4	7.2	16.7	5.0	0.0	0.2	1.4	0.8	3.9	0.1	0.2	0.1	14.2	3.9	7.7	1.9	0.3
Skåde Skole	22.6	7.1	13.8	11.9	9.1	0.2	0.2	1.9	0.1	3.9	0.1	0.1	0.6	18.4	2.8	4.9	2.0	0.2
Katrinebjergskolen, Aarhus N	31.1	7.3	7.5	18.3	5.1	0.1	0.2	1.7	0.2	2.8	0.3	0.4	0.1	8.8	2.2	11.2	3.0	0.1
Vorrevangskolen, Aarhus N	34.1	5.6	6.3	19.6	2.7	0.1	0.5	1.1	0.2	4.8	0.3	0.5	0.1	5.2	4.1	11.8	2.7	0.3

== Results ==
Party		Votes	%	+/-	Seats	+/-
Aarhus Municipality
A	Social Democrats	65,864	30.53	+1.79	10	0
F	Green Left	32,879	15.24	+1.50	5	+1
V	Venstre	25,512	11.83	-0.04	4	0
Ø	Red-Green Alliance	18,691	8.66	-1.23	3	0
C	Conservatives	18,075	8.38	-6.21	3	-2
B	Social Liberals	15,136	7.02	-2.22	2	-1
I	Liberal Alliance	11,815	5.48	+3.66	2	+2
Æ	Denmark Democrats	8,673	4.02	New	1	New
O	Danish People's Party	7,548	3.50	+0.77	1	0
Å	The Alternative	4,913	2.28	+0.97	0	0
M	Moderates	3,299	1.53	New	0	New
N	Nej til privatisering af kommunale veje	856	0.40	New	0	New
Q	Independent Greens	532	0.25	New	0	New
K	Christian Democrats	530	0.25	-0.56	0	0
E	Borger-Initiativet	451	0.21	New	0	New
R	Kommunistisk Parti	382	0.18	New	0	New
T	BorgerTinget	368	0.17	New	0	New
J	Aarhus Borgernes Stemme	170	0.08	New	0	New
P	Troværdig Politik	38	0.02	New	0	New
Total		215,732	100	N/A	31	N/A
Invalid votes		588	0.19	-0.11		
Blank votes		2,819	0.92	0.0		
Turnout		219,139	71.62	+3.41		
Source: valg.dk

== Opinion polls ==
Polling firm	Fieldwork date	Sample size	A	C	F	V	Ø	B	O	I	Å	K	J	M	R	Æ	Others	Lead
Epinion	4 Sep - 13 Oct 2025	615	23.6	5.3	19.9	10.5	13.0	5.1	3.6	9.4	3.0	–	–	1.4	–	4.3	1.0	3.7
2024 european parliament election	9 Jun 2024		12.9	8.9	23.7	10.7	9.6	10.7	3.4	7.1	4.3	–	–	5.6	–	3.0	–	10.8
2022 general election	1 Nov 2022		22.5	4.7	11.4	11.7	8.4	7.0	1.3	10.7	5.5	0.5	–	9.3	–	3.4	–	10.8
2021 regional election	16 Nov 2021		27.0	13.2	11.0	13.7	11.1	9.1	2.5	2.2	1.3	1.4	–	–	–	–	–	13.3
2021 municipal election	16 Nov 2021		28.7 (10)	14.6 (5)	13.7 (4)	11.9 (4)	9.9 (3)	9.2 (3)	2.7 (1)	1.8 (0)	1.3 (0)	0.8 (0)	–	–	–	–	–	14.1
