= 2021 Aarhus municipal election =

- 16 November 2021

All 31 seats to the Aarhus Municipal Council 16 seats needed for a majority
- Turnout: 196,274 (68.2%) ▼2.3pp
	First party	Second party	Third party
	A	C	F
Party	Social Democrats	Conservatives	Green Left
Last election	13 seats, 37.8%	1 seat, 4.2%	3 seats, 9.2%
Seats won	10	5	4
Seat change	▼3	▲4	▲1
Popular vote	55,295	28,077	26,439
Percentage	28.7%	14.6%	13.7%
Swing	▼9.1%	▲10.4%	▲4.5%
	Fourth party	Fifth party	Sixth party
	V	Ø	B
Party	Venstre	Red–Green Alliance	Social Liberals
Last election	6 seats, 15.3%	2 seats, 7.2%	2 seats, 8.2%
Seats won	4	3	3
Seat change	▼2	▲1	▲1
Popular vote	2,2835	19,044	17,761
Percentage	11.9%	9.9%	9.2%
Swing	▼3.4%	▲2.7%	▲1.0%
	Seventh party	Eighth party	Ninth party
	D	O	I
Party	New Right	Danish People's Party	Liberal Alliance
Last election	0 seats, 1.1%	2 seats, 6.4%	1 seat, 4.1%
Seats won	1	1	0
Seat change	▲1	▼1	▼1
Popular vote	6,174	5,252	3,496
Percentage	3.2%	2.7%	1.8%
Swing	▲2.1%	▼3.7%	▼2.3%
- Result in each polling area
Mayor before election
Jacob Bundsgaard
Social Democrats
Mayor after election
Jacob Bundsgaard
Social Democrats

Being one of the strongest municipalities for parties of the traditional red bloc, Jacob Bundsgaard from the Social Democrats, who had been mayor since 2014, was expected to be re-elected in this election. In the campaign before the election, Jacob Bundsgaard did remarkably not include his party logo or name on his election posters.

However, he would still suffer seat losses similar to those the Social Democrats saw in all 4 largest municipalities of Denmark in the 2021 Danish local elections.

As in the 2017 Aarhus municipal election, Jacob Bundsgaard became the person to receive the most personal votes in Denmark as a whole, however he received only 19,279 compared to 39,841 in 2017.

Despite being the biggest party, the Social Democrats lost 3 seats, but the parties of the traditional red bloc won 20 of the 31 seats, and it was later announced that Jacob Bundsgaard would continue as mayor.

== Electoral system ==
For elections to Danish municipalities, a number varying from 9 to 55 are chosen to be elected to the municipal council. The seats are then allocated using the D'Hondt method and a closed list proportional representation. Aarhus Municipality had 31 seats in 2021

Unlike in Danish General Elections, in elections to municipal councils, electoral alliances are allowed.

== Electoral alliances ==
=== Electoral Alliance 1 ===
Party		Political alignment
A	Social Democrats	Centre-left
B	Social Liberals	Centre to centre-left
F	Green Left	Centre-left to left-wing

=== Electoral Alliance 2 ===
Party		Political alignment
C	Conservatives	Centre-right
D	New Right	Right-wing to far-right
I	Liberal Alliance	Centre-right to right-wing
K	Christian Democrats	Centre to centre-right
O	Danish People's Party	Right-wing to far-right
V	Venstre	Centre-right

=== Electoral Alliance 3 ===
Party		Political alignment
G	Vegan Party	Single-issue
J	De Grønne	Local politics
Ø	Red–Green Alliance	Left-wing to far-Left
Å	The Alternative	Centre-left to left-wing

== Results by polling station ==
(This list only includes selected parties)
H = Trivsel og Reel Borgerinddragelse
J = De Grønne
R = Kommunisterne
U = Bedre Aarhus
Æ = Egalitært Folkeparti

Division	A	B	C	D	F	G	I	H	J	K	O	R	U	V	Y	Æ	Ø	Å
Division	%	%	%	%	%	%	%	%	%	%	%	%	%	%	%	%	%	%
Frederiksbjerg Hallerne	25.6	10.8	16.2	2.0	13.6	0.4	1.9	0.5	0.3	0.6	1.5	0.1	0.2	11.7	0.1	0.0	12.4	2.1
Lokalcenter Fr.Bjerg/Langenæs	30.2	11.6	12.3	2.5	13.1	0.7	2.0	0.4	0.2	0.8	2.4	0.1	0.2	9.4	0.2	0.1	12.2	1.6
Rundhøjhallen, Holme	32.6	6.3	16.8	4.2	12.0	0.5	1.0	0.5	0.2	0.5	3.0	0.1	0.3	12.2	0.2	0.0	8.7	0.9
Kragelundskolen, Højbjerg	27.8	9.1	16.8	2.8	12.5	0.4	1.4	0.6	0.3	0.7	2.6	0.0	0.3	13.6	0.5	0.0	9.3	1.3
Tranbjerg Skole	38.4	4.8	13.6	4.8	11.4	0.4	1.5	0.6	0.1	0.6	5.9	0.1	0.1	13.0	0.1	0.0	4.0	0.6
Rosenvangskolen, Viby J	30.1	8.0	19.3	3.2	12.9	0.3	1.6	0.8	0.2	0.5	2.5	0.0	0.3	10.7	0.1	0.0	8.2	1.0
Viby Hallen	35.4	7.5	13.9	3.7	11.1	0.6	2.1	0.7	0.3	0.7	3.6	0.1	0.2	9.2	0.1	0.1	9.3	1.3
Beder Skole	33.0	4.5	14.0	2.9	15.6	0.2	1.0	0.4	0.2	0.8	2.9	0.1	0.0	13.0	0.1	0.0	9.4	1.8
DOKK1	21.3	12.0	19.3	2.1	11.8	0.7	3.0	0.4	0.5	0.4	1.1	0.1	0.2	13.0	0.0	0.0	12.3	1.8
Malling Skole	31.9	4.7	14.5	4.1	14.2	0.5	1.0	0.4	0.2	0.4	3.7	0.1	0.1	14.3	0.2	0.0	8.8	0.9
Mårslet Skole	31.9	5.8	16.3	3.0	14.9	0.2	1.5	0.3	0.2	0.8	2.0	0.1	0.1	14.1	0.2	0.0	8.0	0.7
Solbjergskolen	26.6	4.6	15.1	5.6	10.9	0.2	1.5	0.9	0.2	1.3	4.2	0.1	0.0	23.0	0.1	0.0	5.1	0.5
Ormslev Præstegård	24.4	9.3	16.1	5.2	13.6	0.5	0.7	0.7	0.9	0.9	4.3	0.0	0.0	13.6	0.2	0.0	9.5	0.2
Hasselager Hallen	34.5	4.3	13.6	6.6	14.8	0.3	1.2	0.6	0.2	0.5	6.1	0.1	0.1	12.1	0.2	0.0	4.4	0.4
Højvangskolen, Stavtrup	33.4	6.4	13.0	4.0	13.8	0.4	0.9	1.4	0.0	0.2	3.4	0.1	0.1	13.0	0.3	0.0	9.1	0.5
Rådhushallen	22.8	12.3	16.3	1.7	12.5	0.7	3.3	0.4	0.4	0.3	1.0	0.2	0.2	13.0	0.1	0.1	12.2	2.3
Globus 1	23.0	33.6	6.3	1.8	8.7	0.5	1.4	0.1	0.5	3.2	1.9	0.2	0.3	4.8	0.2	0.0	12.2	1.3
Brabrandhallen, Brabrand	40.9	3.5	12.0	7.4	8.4	0.2	1.2	2.4	0.0	0.5	3.9	0.0	0.0	13.9	0.1	0.0	5.2	0.3
Hasle Skole	28.9	11.3	11.7	2.5	14.9	0.4	1.7	0.7	0.5	2.4	2.8	0.2	0.1	9.6	0.2	0.1	10.4	1.5
Gammelgårdskolen, Åbyhøj	32.2	8.5	12.9	2.8	16.4	0.5	1.1	0.6	0.3	1.2	2.7	0.1	0.2	9.9	0.0	0.0	9.6	0.9
Skjoldhøjskolen	33.5	9.9	9.9	3.5	11.5	0.7	1.1	1.4	0.4	1.6	4.8	0.2	0.2	9.7	0.1	0.0	10.5	0.9
VIA University College	23.1	13.2	18.3	2.1	11.1	0.6	4.0	0.3	0.4	0.6	0.9	0.1	0.2	14.8	0.1	0.1	8.5	1.6
TST Aktiv-Center, Tilst	35.3	8.5	10.3	4.3	10.0	0.7	1.1	4.7	0.4	1.5	4.0	0.0	0.1	12.3	0.2	0.0	5.8	0.7
Næshøjhallen	40.9	3.5	12.0	7.4	8.4	0.2	1.2	2.4	0.0	0.5	3.9	0.0	0.0	13.9	0.1	0.0	5.2	0.3
Skovvangskolen	26.1	11.4	11.8	2.1	17.0	0.8	1.7	0.6	0.7	0.7	1.8	0.2	0.2	7.5	0.2	0.0	14.9	2.2
Samsøgades Skole	21.9	13.8	11.5	1.4	16.0	0.6	2.3	0.3	0.4	0.3	1.2	0.1	0.3	8.5	0.2	0.1	18.4	2.8
Sabro-Korsvejskolen, Sabro	37.2	4.8	13.2	6.2	8.2	0.2	1.7	0.7	0.1	0.6	6.0	0.0	0.1	16.3	0.2	0.0	3.9	0.7
Borum Forsamlingshus	25.9	6.2	9.1	8.4	14.8	1.0	0.5	0.5	0.0	1.0	4.2	0.0	0.0	13.6	0.0	0.2	12.6	2.0
Møllevangskolen	29.2	10.8	12.2	2.1	14.2	0.7	2.1	0.5	0.6	0.6	2.5	0.3	0.1	7.9	0.2	0.2	13.8	1.9
Lisbjergskolen	28.6	8.9	10.3	3.9	17.0	1.0	1.3	0.4	0.6	1.6	3.9	0.0	0.4	9.5	0.4	0.0	11.3	1.1
Bellevue-Hallen	21.5	6.5	26.2	3.1	12.4	0.1	1.3	1.0	0.2	0.6	2.3	0.0	0.2	14.4	0.2	0.0	9.2	0.9
Skødstrup Hallen	27.6	4.8	13.0	4.2	15.7	0.3	1.9	0.4	0.3	0.6	3.0	0.1	0.0	22.6	0.1	0.0	4.7	0.6
Sølystskolen, Egå	29.2	4.9	21.9	3.6	10.6	0.5	1.5	1.0	0.2	0.9	3.5	0.0	0.0	15.4	0.1	0.0	6.2	0.7
Virupskolen, Hjortshøj	21.9	3.7	7.3	2.4	40.4	0.3	0.7	0.4	0.4	0.5	2.7	0.0	0.0	8.2	0.1	0.0	10.2	0.6
Bjørnshøjcentret, Trige	35.7	5.8	10.5	5.6	10.6	0.6	0.8	1.4	0.2	1.6	4.6	0.3	0.1	14.1	0.1	0.0	7.5	0.6
Spørring Fælleshus	27.3	5.4	19.6	5.2	10.6	0.3	0.7	0.5	0.0	0.7	6.2	0.2	0.0	17.0	0.3	0.0	4.7	1.2
Håruphallen	29.5	2.8	7.4	5.5	12.7	0.3	1.4	0.5	0.1	0.6	3.8	0.0	0.0	29.0	0.5	0.0	5.4	0.7
Ellevangskolen, Risskov	32.1	6.8	14.4	4.1	15.4	0.4	1.1	1.0	0.3	0.9	3.3	0.1	0.2	10.2	0.1	0.0	8.4	0.9
Åby Hallen	32.0	9.0	12.9	2.6	15.0	0.6	2.2	0.5	0.3	1.0	2.0	0.1	0.3	9.6	0.2	0.0	10.7	1.0
Center-10	29.5	15.0	8.7	2.1	15.9	0.8	1.5	0.6	0.4	1.1	2.2	0.2	0.2	7.1	0.2	0.1	13.0	1.4
Søndervangskolen, Viby J	39.1	22.0	7.0	2.8	6.8	0.1	1.5	0.3	0.6	0.5	3.0	0.1	0.4	6.3	0.3	0.0	8.7	0.5
Skåde Skole	22.3	6.1	26.6	4.5	9.6	0.8	2.3	0.8	0.3	0.4	1.9	0.1	0.2	16.7	0.3	0.1	6.1	0.9
Vorrevangskolen	39.6	6.8	6.6	3.2	17.0	0.6	0.8	0.7	0.4	1.3	3.4	0.3	0.3	4.6	0.2	0.1	13.1	1.0
Katrinebjergskolen	26.2	11.6	12.2	2.1	15.0	0.8	2.7	0.4	0.6	0.8	2.1	0.1	0.1	7.8	0.2	0.1	15.0	2.3
Lystrup Hallen	31.1	4.9	14.3	4.5	17.0	0.2	1.3	0.4	0.3	0.8	4.3	0.1	0.1	13.2	0.1	0.0	6.7	0.6
Vejlby-Risskov Hallen	28.9	11.4	12.0	2.7	15.2	0.9	2.1	0.6	0.3	1.4	2.3	0.2	0.1	8.6	0.1	0.1	11.5	1.7
Skæring Skole	26.3	4.0	21.3	5.0	11.6	0.3	1.9	0.7	0.2	0.7	4.4	0.1	0.0	17.1	0.2	0.0	5.7	0.6

== Results ==
Party		Votes	%	+/-	Seats	+/-
Aarhus Municipality
A	Social Democrats	55,295	28.74	-9.03	10	-3
C	Conservatives	28,077	14.59	+10.35	5	+4
F	Green Left	26,439	13.74	+4.49	4	+1
V	Venstre	22,835	11.87	-3.46	4	-2
Ø	Red-Green Alliance	19,044	9.90	+2.74	3	+1
B	Social Liberals	17,761	9.23	+0.99	3	+1
D	New Right	6,174	3.21	+2.11	1	+1
O	Danish People's Party	5,252	2.73	-3.69	1	-1
I	Liberal Alliance	3,496	1.82	-2.29	0	-1
Å	The Alternative	2,523	1.31	-3.61	0	-1
K	Christian Democrats	1,554	0.81	+0.07	0	0
H	Trivsel og Reel Borgerinddragelse	1,325	0.69	New	0	New
G	Vegan Party	994	0.52	New	0	New
J	De Grønne	651	0.34	New	0	New
Y	Freedom List	306	0.16	New	0	New
U	Bedre Aarhus	300	0.16	New	0	New
R	Kommunisterne	213	0.11	New	0	New
Æ	Egalitært Folkeparti	90	0.05	New	0	New
Q	Partiet Samfundssind	74	0.04	New	0	New
Total		192,403	100	N/A	31	N/A
Invalid votes		864	0.30	+0.10		
Blank votes		3,007	1.04	+0.20		
Turnout		196,274	68.21	-2.27		
Source: valg.dk
