= List of neighborhoods in Aarhus, Denmark =

Aarhus has many neighborhoods of historic nature, including:

- Midtbyen (or Aarhus C)
  - Docklands
  - Frederiksbjerg
  - Indre by
    - Latin Quarter
  - Langenæs
  - Trøjborg
  - Vesterbro
    - CeresByen
    - Øgadekvarteret
  - Marselisborg
  - Nørre Stenbro

Neighborhoods beyond the Ring 1 ring road include:

- Christiansbjerg
- Fuglebakken
- Hasle
  - Bispehaven
- Holme
- Højbjerg
- Risskov
- Viby
- Aabyhøj
  - Aaby

Neighborhoods beyond the Ring 2 ring road include:

- Brabrand
- Egå
- Finnebyen
- Gellerup
- Hasselager
  - Kolt
- Herredsvang
- Kalenderkvarteret
- Rosenhøj
- Tilst
- Tranbjerg
- Toveshøj
- Vejlby
- Skejby
- Skæring
- Skødstrup
- Skåde
- Slet
- Stavtrup

== See also ==
- Administrative divisions of Aarhus Municipality
