= 2017 Aarhus Municipal election =

Municipal election in Denmark

- November 21, 2017

All 31 seats in the Aarhus Municipal Council 16 seats needed for a majority
- Turnout: 192,757 (70.5%) ▲5.2%
	First party	Second party	Third party
	A	V	F
Party	Social Democrats	Venstre	Green Left
Last election	13 seats, 38.2%	6 seats, 17.2%	2 seats, 6.8%
Seats won	13	6	3
Seat change	0	0	▲1
Popular vote	68,798	29,051	17,531
Percentage	38.2%	15.3%	9.2%
Swing	▼0.4%	▼1.9%	▲2.5%
	Fourth party	Fifth party	Sixth party
	B	Ø	O
Party	Social Liberals	Red–Green Alliance	Danish People's Party
Last election	2 seats, 8.3%	3 seats, 9.4%	2 seats, 7.3%
Seats won	2	2	2
Seat change	0	▼1	0
Popular vote	15,615	13,567	12,174
Percentage	8.2%	7.2%	6.4%
Swing	▼0.1%	▼2.2%	▼0.9%
	Seventh party	Eighth party	Ninth party
	Å	C	I
Party	The Alternative	Conservatives	Liberal Alliance
Last election	New	2 seats, 6.2%	1 seat, 3.8%
Seats won	1	1	1
Seat change	New		0
Popular vote	9,327	8,043	7,786
Percentage	4.9%	4.2%	4.1%
Swing	New	▼2.0%	▲0.3%
Mayor before election
Jacob Bundsgaard
Social Democrats
Elected Mayor
Jacob Bundsgaard
Social Democrats

The 2017 Aarhus Municipal election was held on 21 November 2017, to elect the 31 members to sit in the regional council for the Aarhus Municipal council, in the period of 2018 to 2021. Jacob Bundsgaard would win the mayoral position.

== Background ==
Following the 2013 election, Jacob Bundsgaard from Social Democrats became mayor for his second term, having taken over from Nicolai Wammen in 2011.

== Electoral System ==
For elections to Danish municipalities, a number varying from 9 to 55 are chosen to be elected to the municipal council. The seats are then allocated using the D'Hondt method and a closed list proportional representation. Aarhus Municipality had 31 seats in 2017.

== Results ==

Party		Votes	%	+/-	Seats	+/-
Aarhus Municipality
A	Social Democrats	71,595	37.77	-0.45	13	0
V	Venstre	29,051	15.33	-1.87	6	0
F	Green Left	17,531	9.25	+2.49	3	+1
B	Social Liberals	15,615	8.24	-0.07	2	0
Ø	Red–Green Alliance	13,567	7.16	-2.22	2	-1
O	Danish People's Party	12,174	6.42	-0.87	2	0
Å	The Alternative	9,327	4.92	New	1	New
C	Conservatives	8,043	4.24	-1.99	1	-1
I	Liberal Alliance	7,786	4.11	+0.28	1	0
D	New Right	2,084	1.10	New	0	New
K	Christian Democrats	1,397	0.74	+0.12	0	0
N	National Party	454	0.24	New	0	New
E	Sammenholdet for Aarhus	439	0.23	New	0	New
R	Kommunististisk Fællesliste	275	0.15	-0.04	0	0
T	Danish Unity	77	0.04	New	0	New
L	Schiller Instituttets Venner	72	0.03	-0.06	0	0
P	Troværdig Politik	53	0.03	New	0	New
Total		189,540	100	N/A	31	N/A
Invalid votes		648	0.24	+0.05		
Blank votes		2,569	0.94	-0.13		
Turnout		192,757	70.48	+5.20		
Source: valg.dk
