= Spørring =

Coordinates: 56.1750°N 10.0847°E

- Town
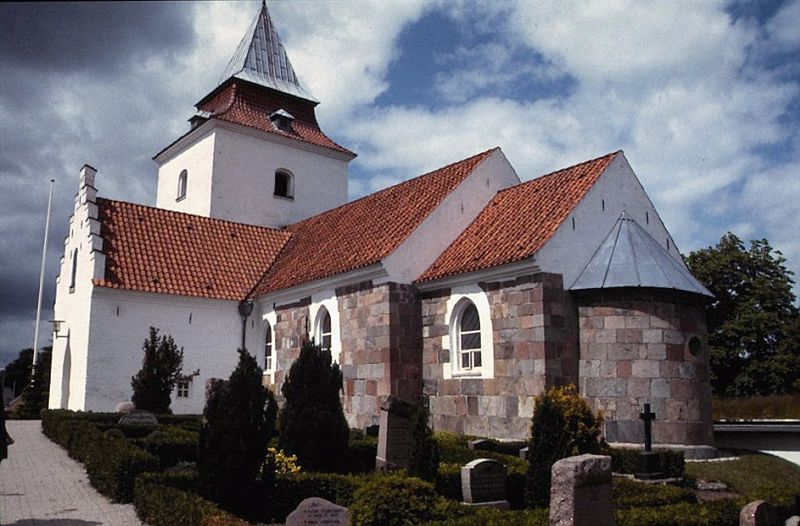
- Spørring church

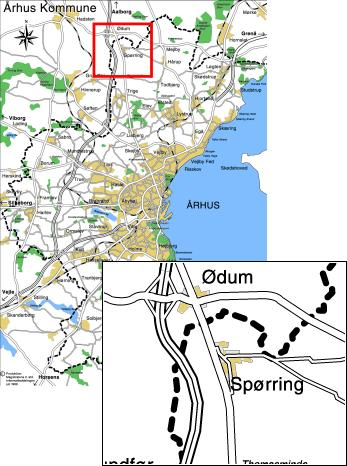
- Location of Spørring in Aarhus Municipality
- Country: Kingdom of Denmark
- Regions of Denmark: Central Denmark Region
- Municipality: Aarhus Municipality
- Parish: Spørring Sogn

Area
  - Urban: 0.5 km^{2} (0.19 sq mi)

Population (2026)
  - Urban: 1,225
  - Urban density: 2,500/km^{2} (6,300/sq mi)
- Postal code: 8380 Trige

Spørring is a town in Aarhus Municipality, Central Denmark Region in Denmark with a population of 1,225 (1 January 2026). Spørring is situated in the northern section of Aarhus Municipality between the city of Aarhus and Randers in Spørring Parish close to Trige and Ølsted.
