= Kolt, Denmark =

Kolt
- Neighborhood
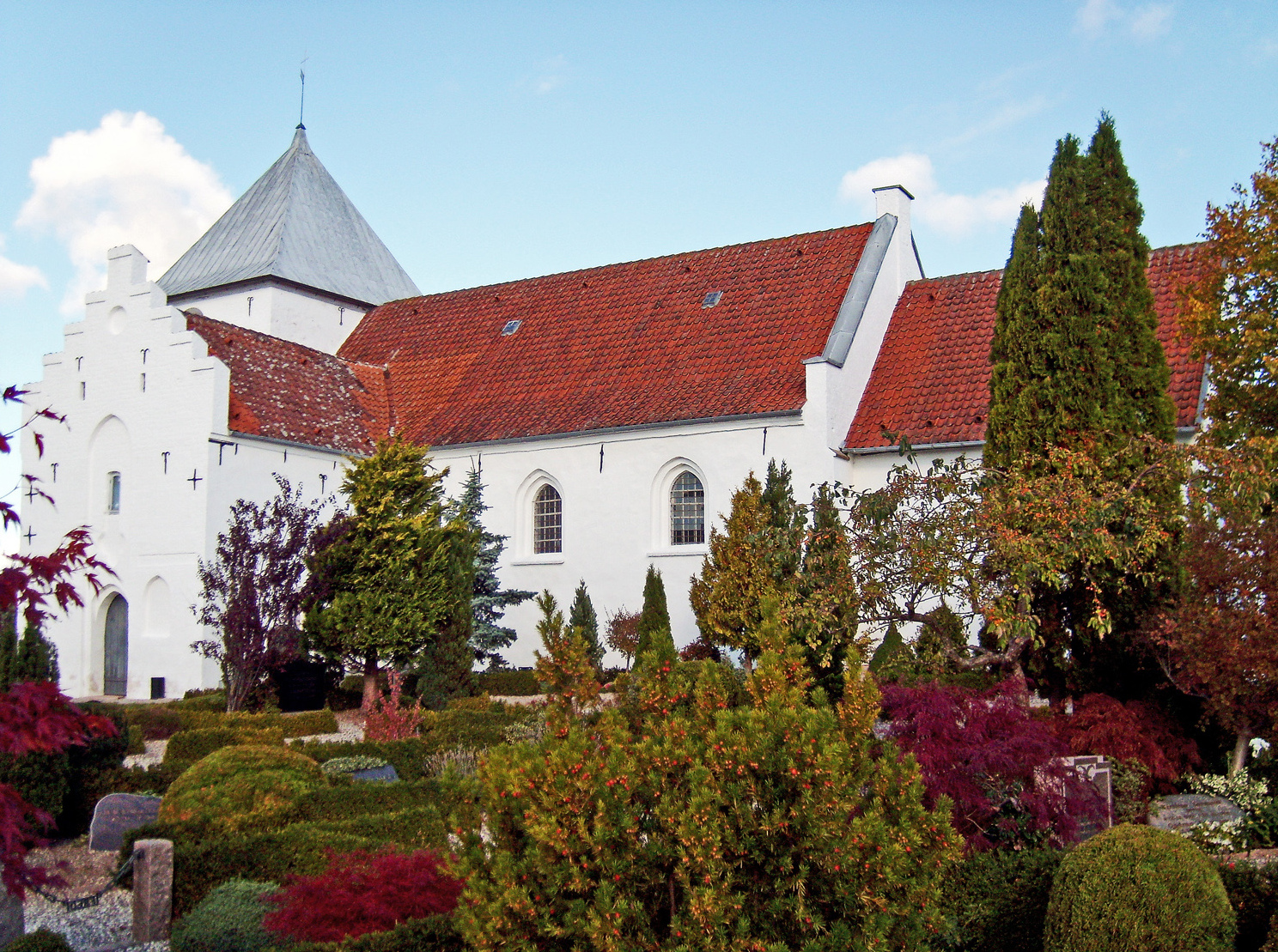
- Kolt Church

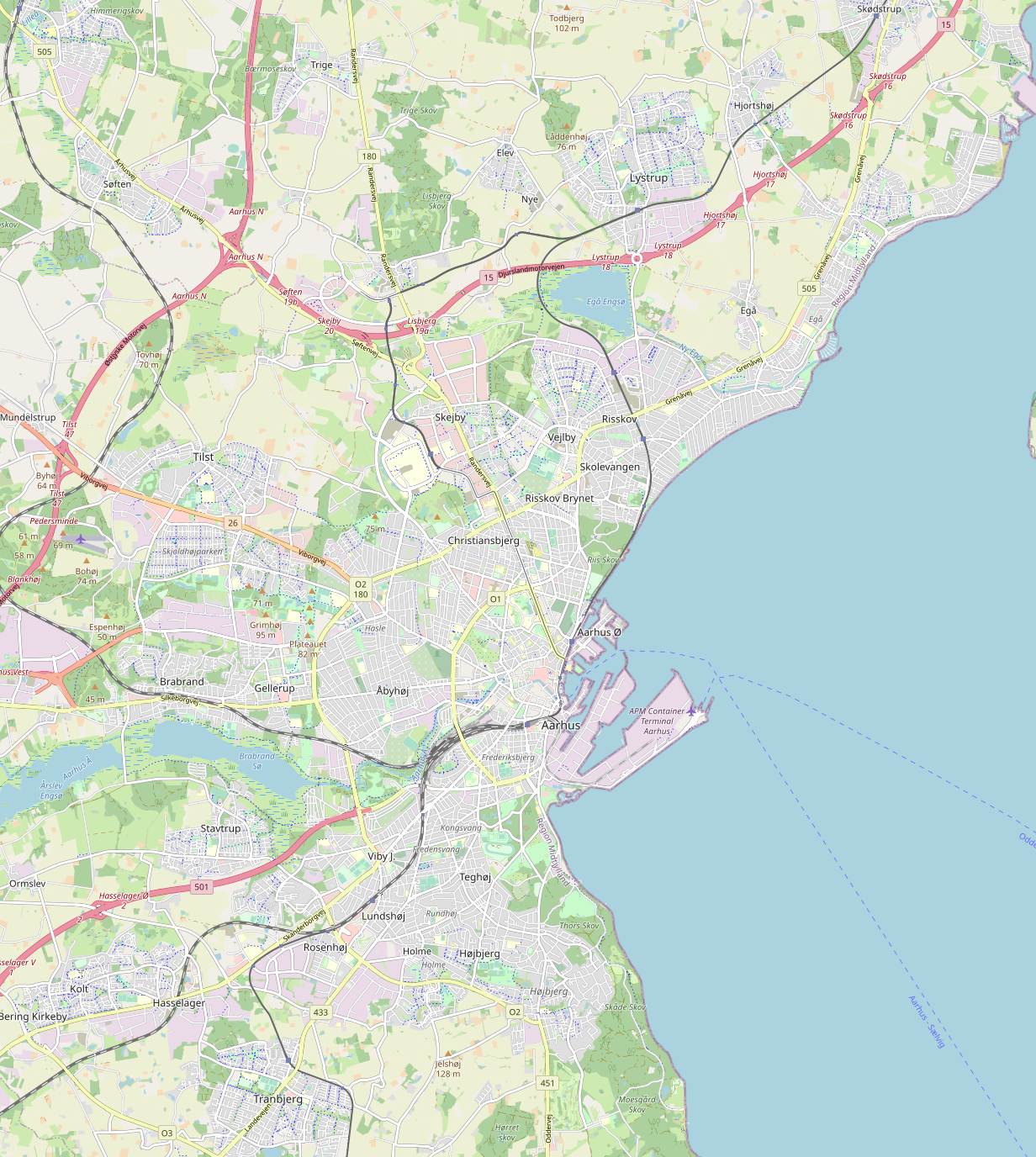
- Location within Aarhus
- Coordinates: 56.106992°N 10.069999°E
- Country: Kingdom of Denmark
- Regions of Denmark: Central Denmark Region
- Municipality: Aarhus Municipality
- District: Hasselager
- Postal code: 8361

Kolt is a south-western suburb of Aarhus in Denmark. It is located about 9 km from the city centre.

Kolt has largely merged with neighbouring area Hasselager in modern times, and the two are collectively known and referred to as Kolt-Hasselager, with a shared postal code of 8361. The area is predominantly residential, but with a large industrial park as well.

== History ==
A settlement is believed to have existed at Kolt since the 14th century, when records refer to the area as Koltee. Over the years, church records called the settlement Koldt, Kolte, Kolt Skovhus, and simply Kolt. This name is possibly derived from the word "knold", meaning knob, in reference to the settlement's slight elevation above the surrounding area.
