= Hårup =

Coordinates: 56.1700°N 10.1300°E

- Town
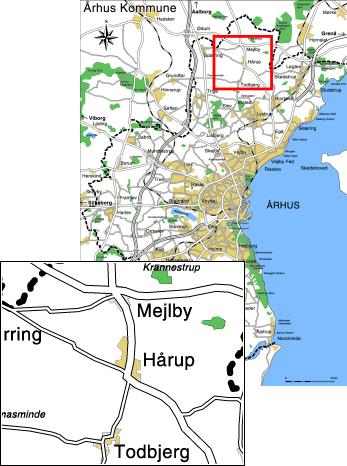
- Location of Hårup in Aarhus Municipality
- Country: Kingdom of Denmark
- Regions of Denmark: Central Denmark Region
- Municipality: Aarhus Municipality
- Parish: Todbjerg Sogn

Population (2026)
  - Total: 989
- Postal code: 8350 Hjortshøj

Hårup is a town in Aarhus Municipality, Central Denmark Region in Denmark with a population of 989 (1 January 2026). Hårup is situated north of the city of Aarhus between the towns Todbjerg and Mejlby in Todbjerg Parish close to Trige og Ølsted.
