= Anders Winnerskjold =

Danish politician (born 1992)

Mayor of Aarhus Municipality
- Incumbent
- Assumed office 6 November 2024
- Preceded by: Jacob Bundsgaard

Personal details
- Born: September 27, 1992 (age 34) Aarhus, Denmark
- Party: Social Democrats
- Spouse: Ane Edslev
- Children: 1
- Education: Aarhus University (MA, Political Science)

Anders Winnerskjold (born 1992) is a Danish politician and member of the Social Democrats who has served as Mayor of Aarhus Municipality since 6 November 2024. At age 32, he is the youngest mayor in Aarhus's recent history.

== Early life and education ==
Winnerskjold was born in 1992 in Aarhus. He was raised in the Åbyhøj neighbourhood. He earned a master's degree in political science from Aarhus University in 2020.

He joined the Social Democratic Youth of Denmark at the age of 13. From 2015 to 2017, he was chairman for the youth party in Aarhus.

== Political career ==
In 2018, Winnerskjold was elected to Aarhus City Council. He began serving as Alderman for the Department of Social Affairs and Employment on 1 January 2022.

Following the resignation of Mayor Jacob Bundsgaard, Winnerskjold was nominated on 24 October 2024 and formally elected mayor by the city council on 6 November 2024.

== Mayoral priorities ==
Winnerskjold has identified student welfare and community initiatives as focal points. He vowed to preserve the beloved "starry sky" Christmas illumination and has championed support for students navigating challenges.

== Academic engagement ==
He returned to Aarhus University as a part-time lecturer in early 2025, co-teaching a course on the interplay between politicians and bureaucrats.

== Personal life ==
Winnerskjold is married to Ane Edslev. They have one daughter.
