= Solbjerg =

Coordinates: 56.0397°N 10.0867°E

- Town
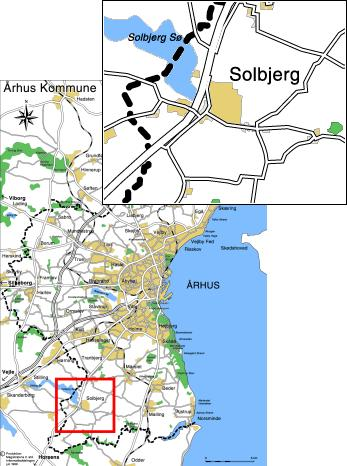
- Location of Solbjerg in Aarhus Municipality
- Country: Denmark
- Region: Region Midtjylland
- Municipality: Aarhus Municipality

Area
  - Urban: 2.4 km^{2} (0.93 sq mi)

Population (2026)
  - Urban: 4,832
  - Urban density: 2,000/km^{2} (5,200/sq mi)
  - Gender: 2,351 males and 2,481 females
- Time zone: UTC+1 (CET)
  - Summer (DST): UTC+2 (CEST)
- Postal code: DK-8355 Solbjerg

Solbjerg is a south-western suburb of Aarhus in Denmark and one of the outer suburbs of Aarhus. It is located 17 km. from the city centre and has a population of 4,832 (1 January 2026).
