= Borum =

Coordinates: 56.1118°N 10.0041°E

- Town
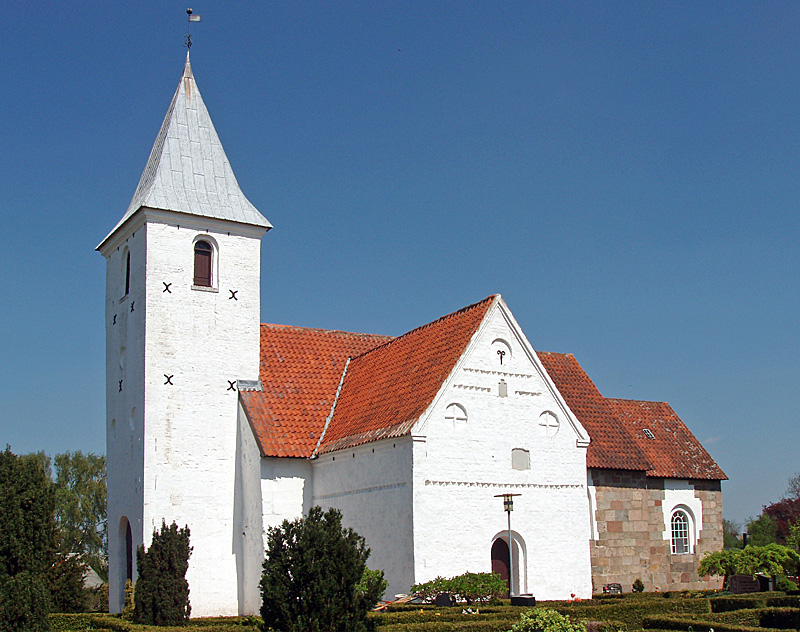
- Borum church

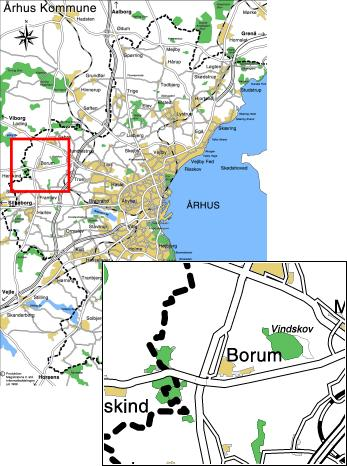
- Location of Borum in Aarhus Municipality
- Country: Kingdom of Denmark
- Regions of Denmark: Central Denmark Region
- Municipality: Aarhus Municipality
- Parish: Borum Sogn

Population (2026)
  - Total: 311
- Postal code: 8471 Sabro

Borum is a village in Aarhus Municipality, Central Denmark Region in Denmark. Borum is situated 2.5 kilometres south of Sabro and 3 kilometres west of the Aarhus suburb of Tilst and has a population of 311 (1 January 2026). About 2 kilometres west of Borum is the village of Herskind.

The village has an active community centered on the village hall, with amateur theatre, film club, choir, cooking, gymnastics, markets, etc. Just south of Borum is the stream of Lyngbygård Å. The stream feeds Årslev Engsø and the Aarhus River and part of the river valley has recently been environmentally restored and reconstructed, with nature paths and trails.

== Borum church ==
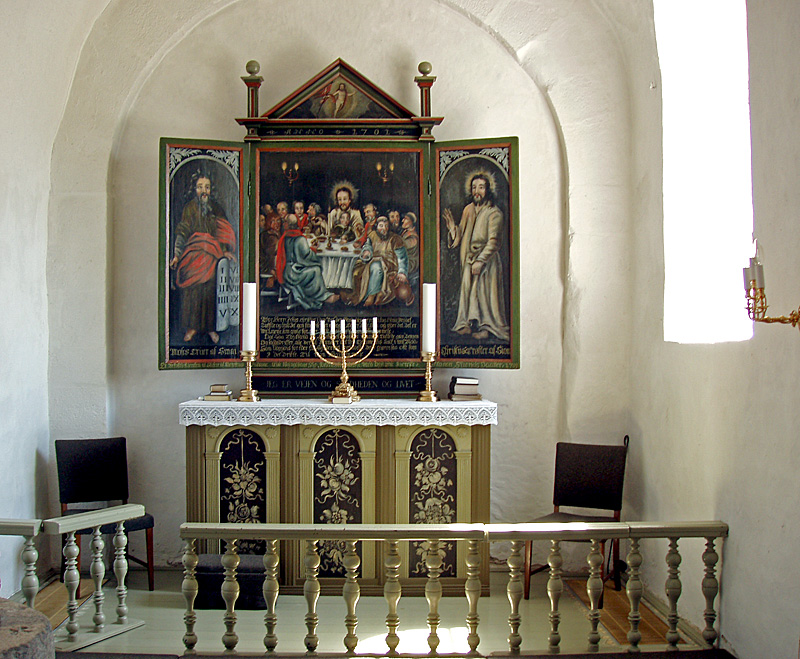
Choir and altar

Borum church is placed on an elevation in the south west, overlooking the village. The older Romanesque parts of the small church is built from granite ashlar. There are several stone carved decorations and church frescos in the church. A 43 x 32 cm grey granite stone with a chiselled sun cross from the Bronze Age was discovered in the 1890s, when an associated stone dyke was dismantled. It has been in possession of the National Museum of Denmark since 1902.

== Bronze Age burial mounds ==
Northwest of the village, towards the lake of Lading Sø, is an elevated plateau overlooking the surrounding landscape, with the remains of several Bronze Age burial mounds (tumuli).

The most famous is Borum Eshøj, one of Denmark's best-known Nordic Bronze Age burial mounds. It contained three remarkably preserved oak coffins holding the remains of two men and a woman, together with intact clothing, daggers, combs and other grave goods dating to the 14th century BC.

Originally measuring about 40 metres (131 ft) in diameter and 9 metres (30 ft) high, the mound was one of the largest burial mounds in eastern Jutland before centuries of quarrying and erosion reduced its size.

A woman's oak-coffin burial was discovered in 1871, followed by archaeological excavations in 1875 that uncovered two further oak-coffin burials.

Today, the site is a protected cultural heritage monument, and a reconstructed Bronze Age settlement with replica houses is located nearby.

=== Gallery ===
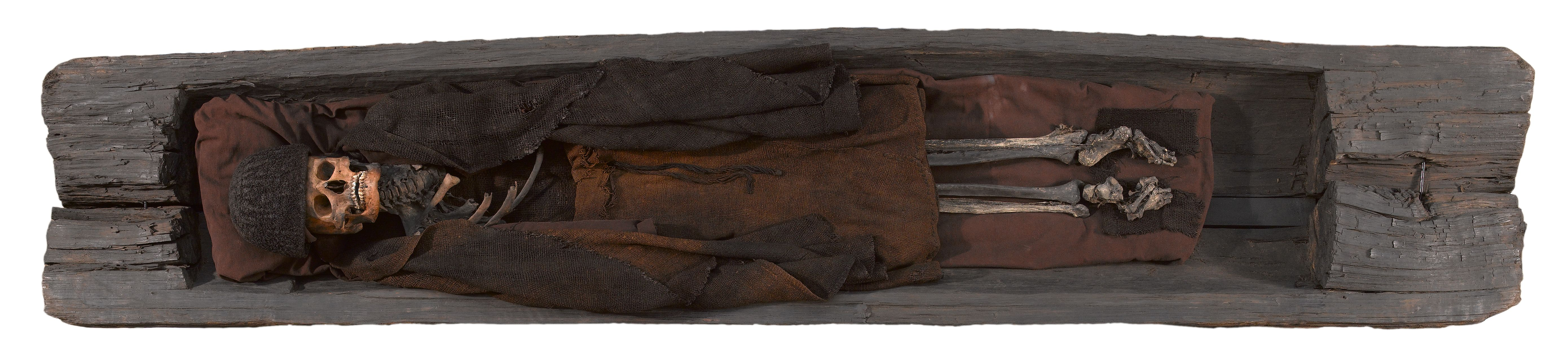
The old man from Borum Eshøj

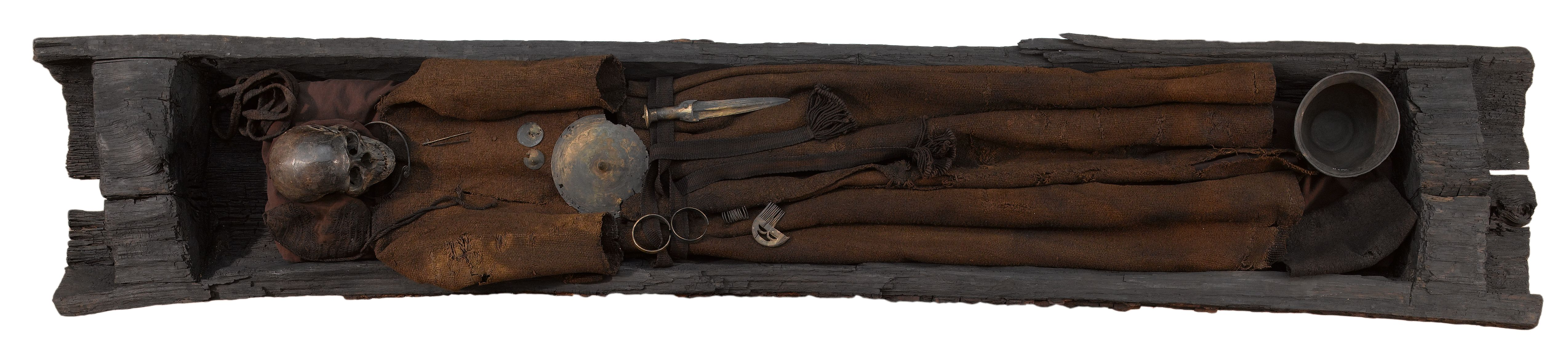
Woman from Borum Eshøj

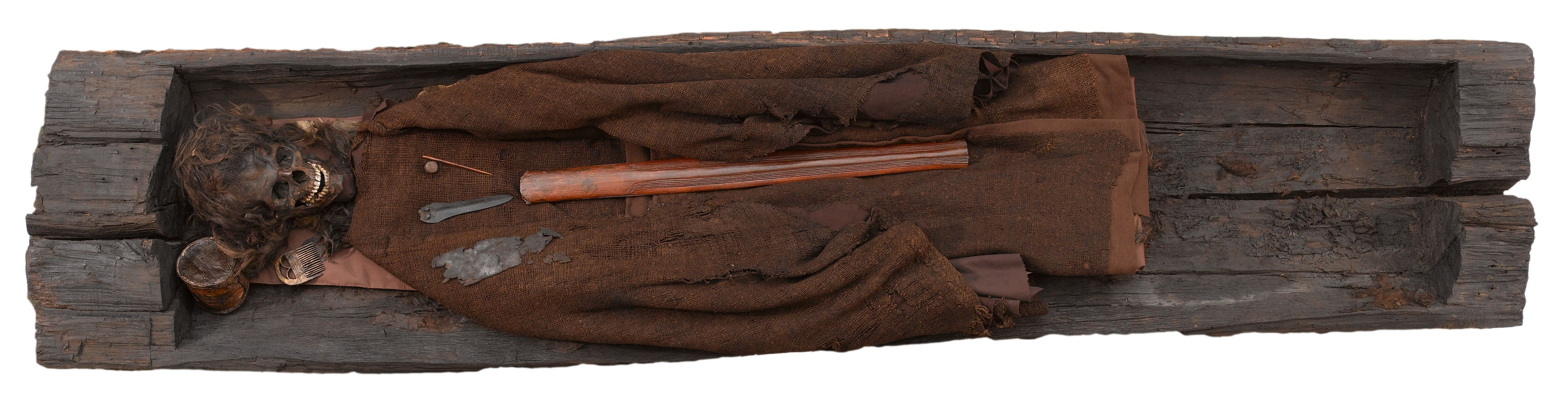
The young man from Borum Eshøj

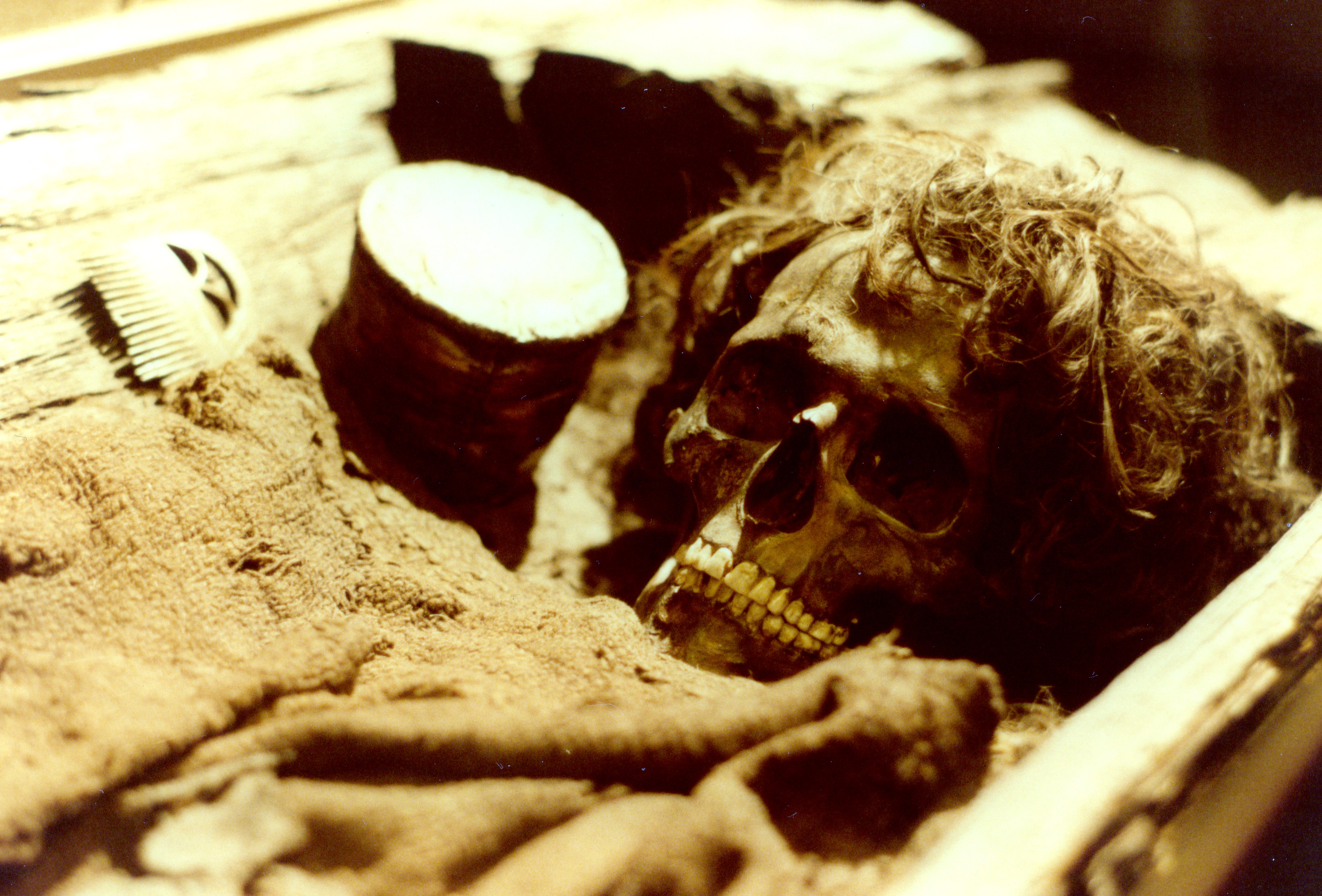
The young man from Borum Eshøj

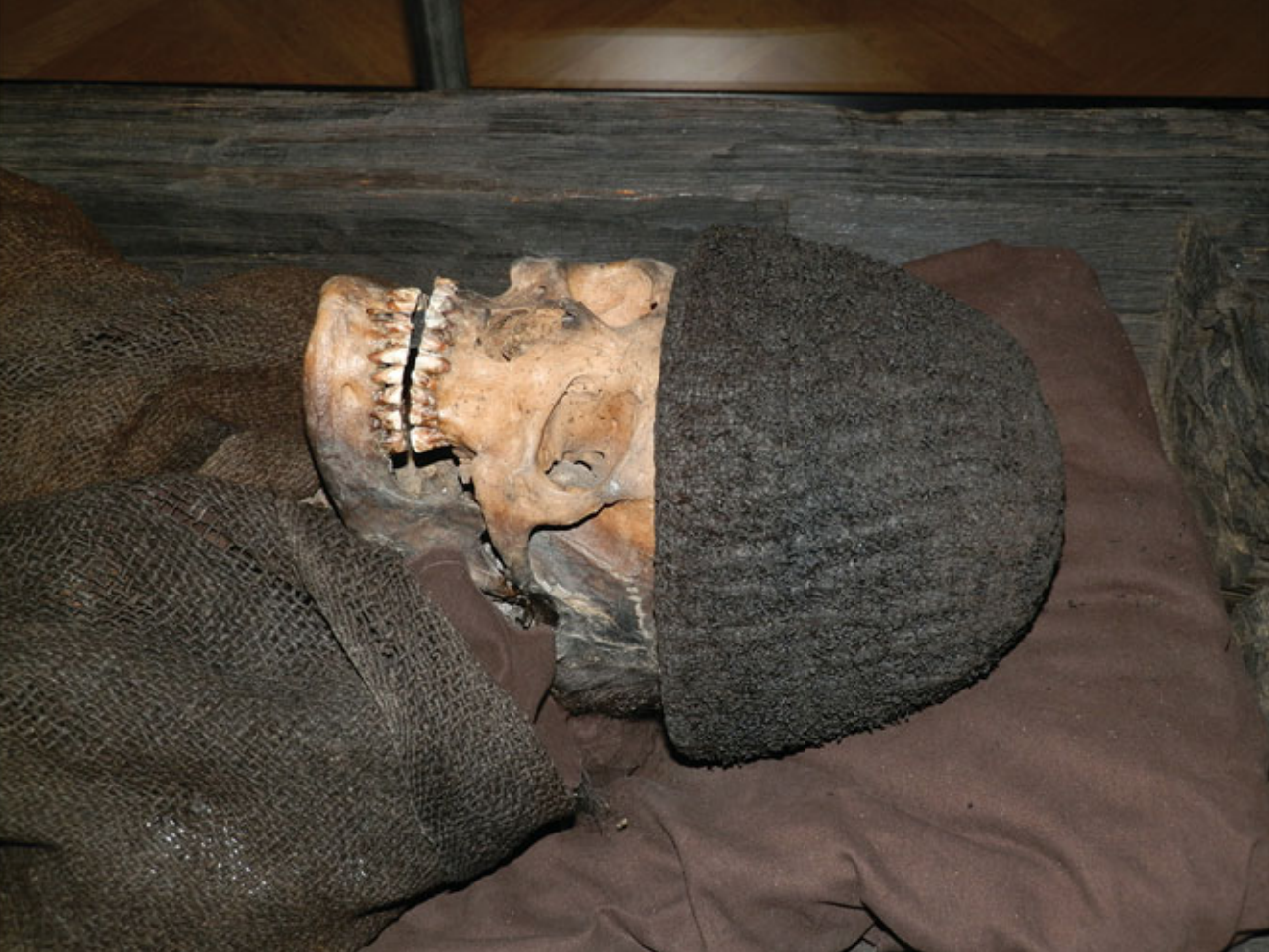
Male burial from Borum Eshøj, with wool clothes and piled cap

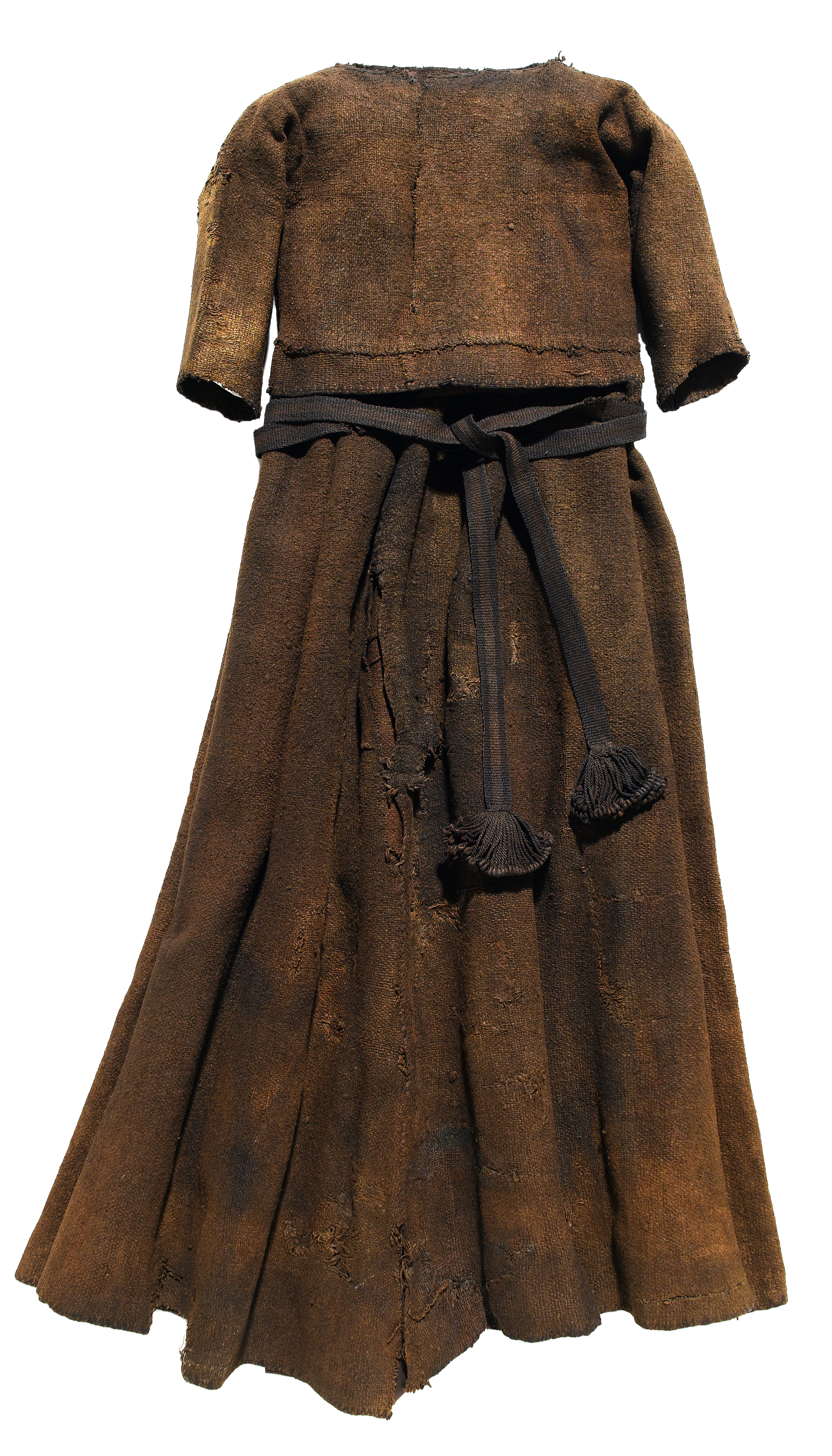
Wool dress from Borum Eshøj

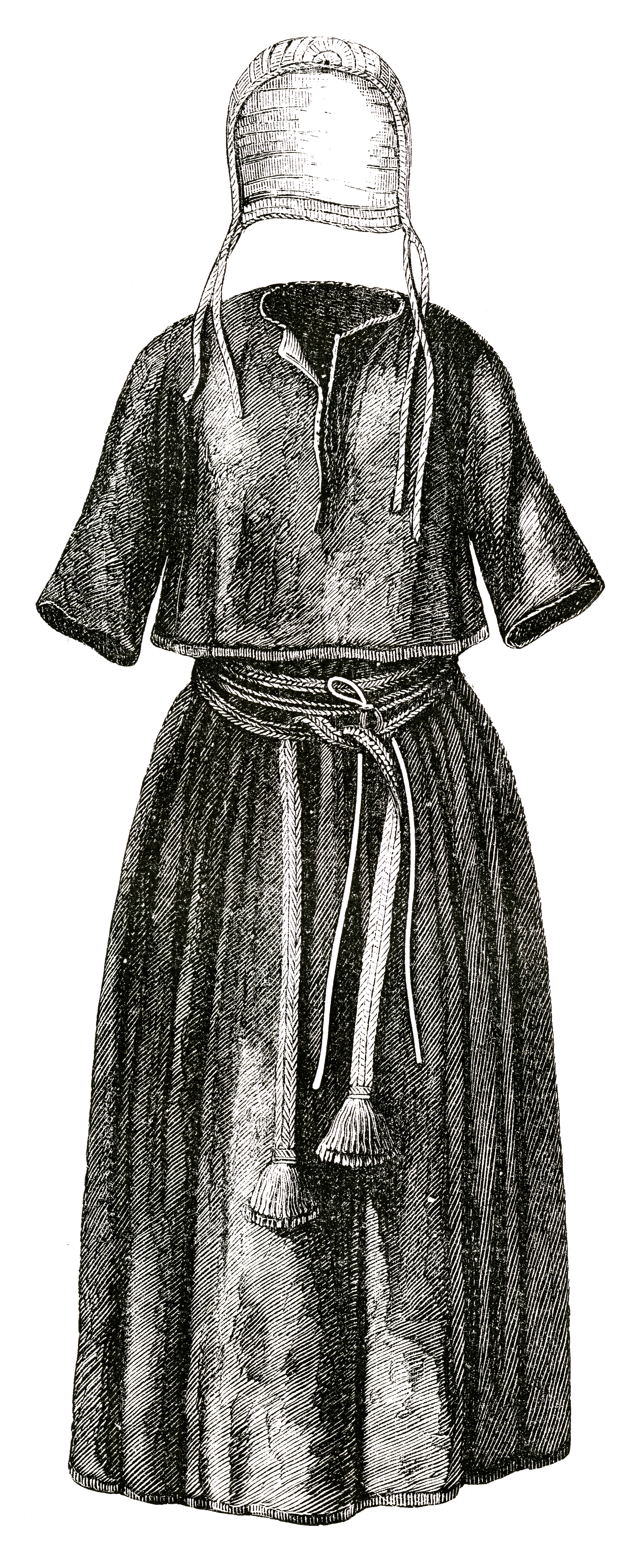
Clothes, illustration

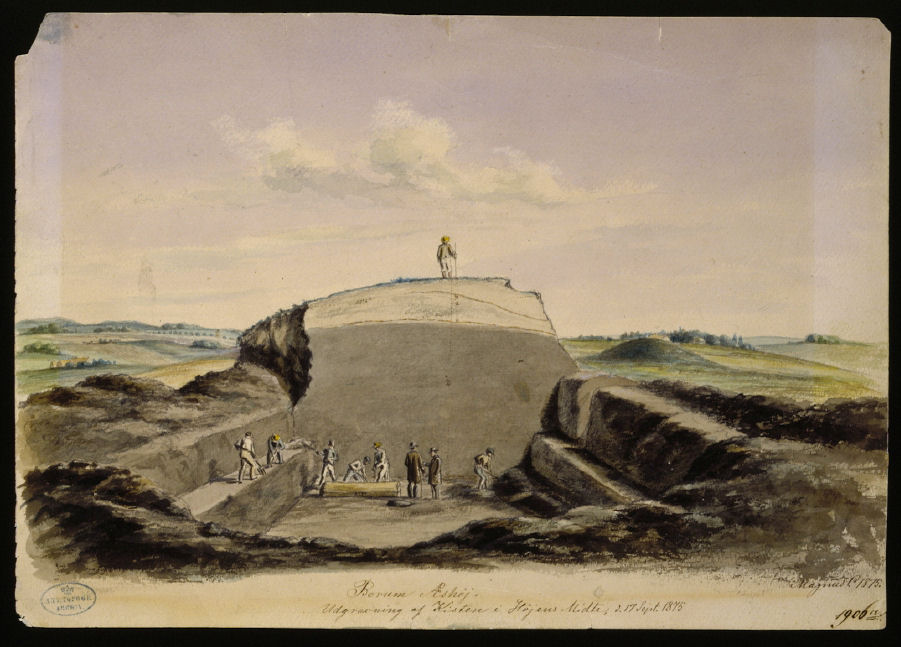
Excavation of the Borum Eshøj burial mound, 1875

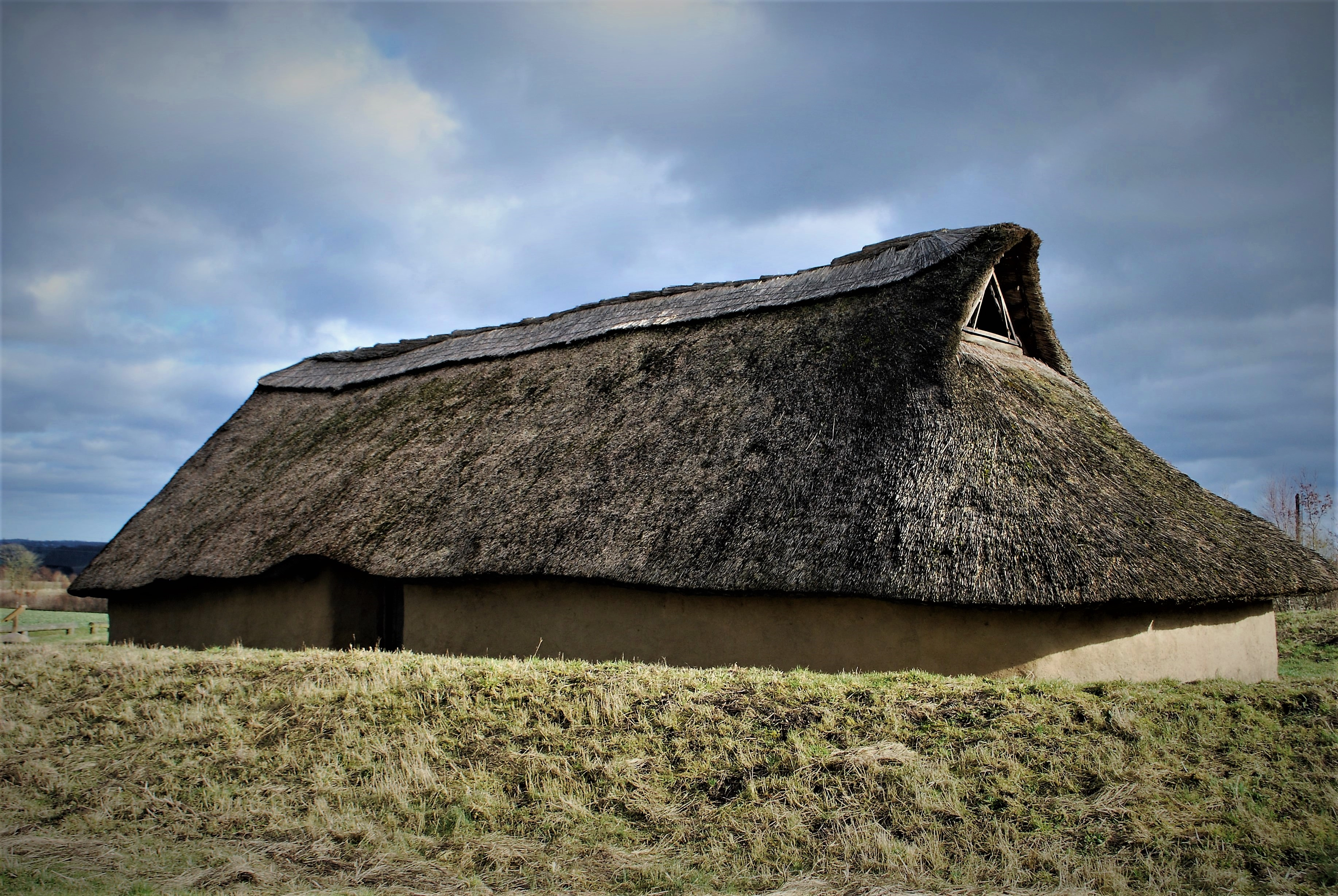
Replica Bronze Age house near Borum Eshøj

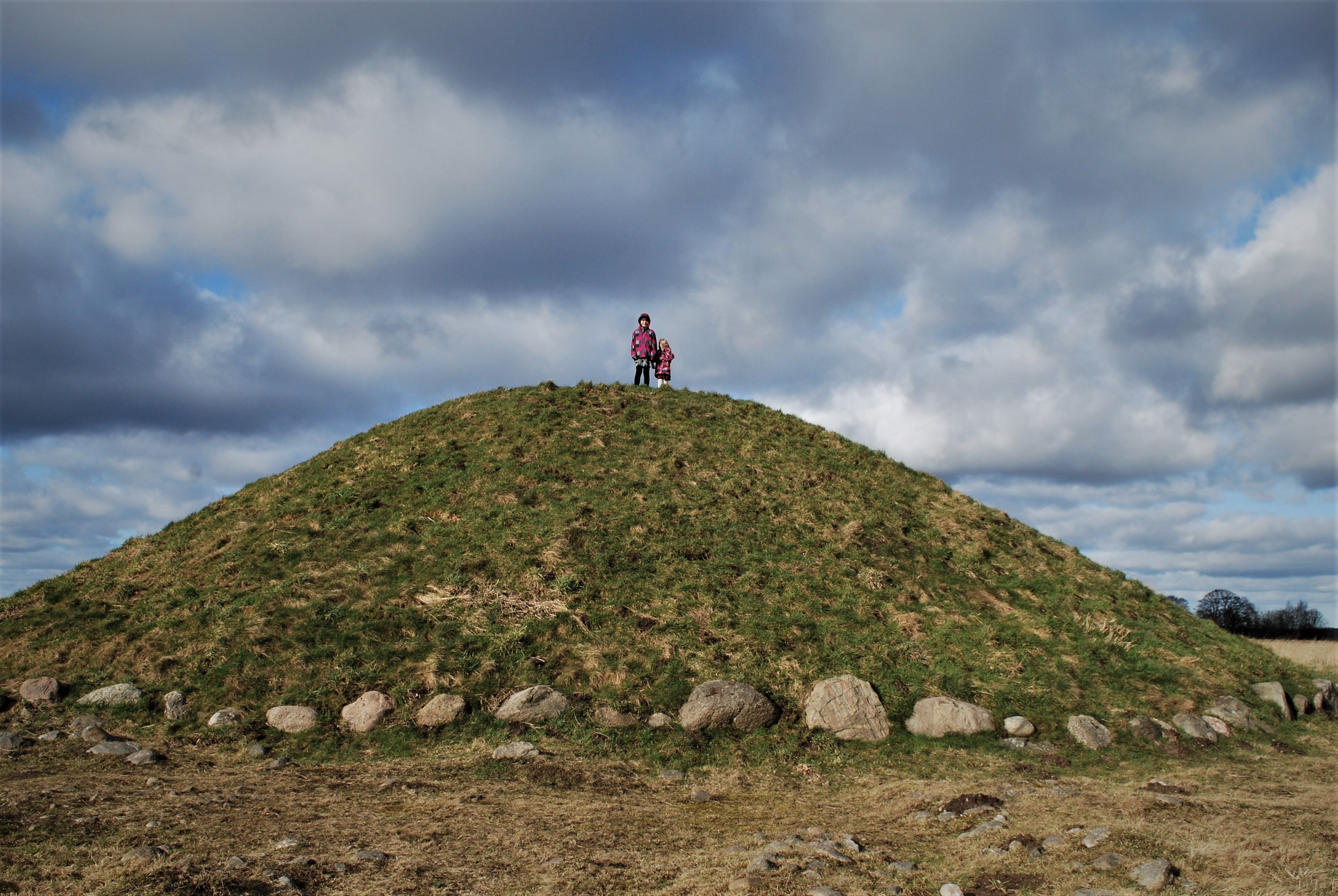
The Borum Eshøj burial mound

== Notable people ==
- Marie Bach Hansen, actress

== Sources ==
- Local historical archives for the Borum and Lyngby parishes (in Danish)
- Official homepage for Borum (in Danish)
- Borum church National Museum of Denmark (in Danish) Summary in English
