= Hjortshøj =

- Town
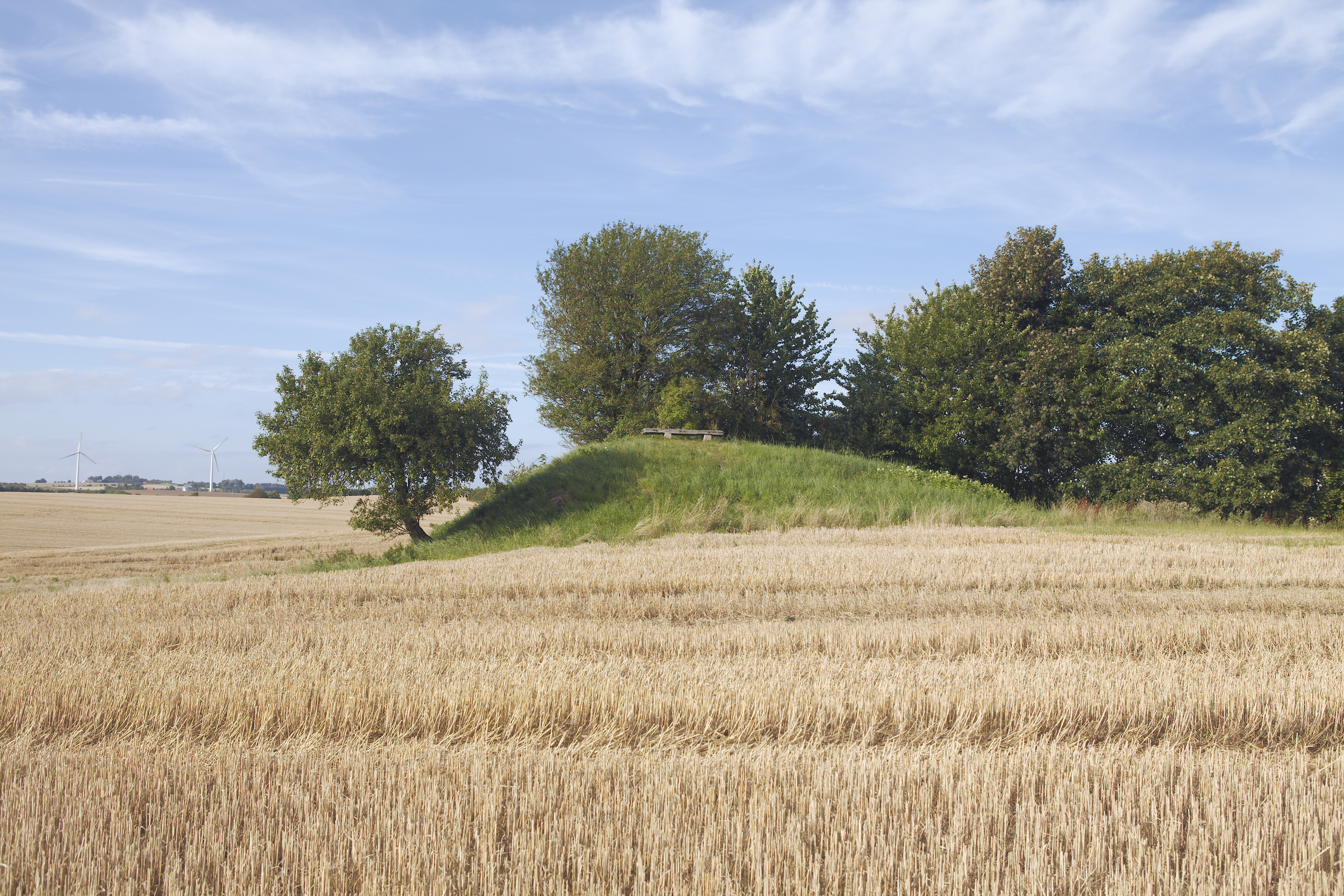
- Hjortshøj, a pre-historic round barrow

- Location in Denmark Hjortshøj (Central Denmark Region)
- Coordinates: 56°14′52″N 10°15′53″E
- Country: Denmark
- Region: Region Midtjylland
- Municipality: Aarhus Municipality

Area
  - Urban: 1.34 km^{2} (0.52 sq mi)

Population (2026)
  - Urban: 3,579
  - Urban density: 2,670/km^{2} (6,920/sq mi)
  - Gender: 1,676 males and 1,903 females
- Time zone: UTC+1 (CET)
  - Summer (DST): UTC+2 (CEST)
- Postal code: DK-8530 Hjortshøj

Hjortshøj is a small railway town in Aarhus Municipality, Denmark. The town is located about 14 kilometres north of Aarhus, and has a population of 3,579 (1 January 2026).

Hjortshøj has a limited infrastructure including a primary school, a post office (in the local Brugsen), a bank and other ancillary businesses. It is served by Hjortshøj railway station, located on the Grenaa railway line. Hjortshøj Church is a typical Danish white village church building dating back to 1100 CE; rebuilt in 1492.

The town is named after the round barrow of Hjortshøj, one of two in the area. Hjortshøj translates as "Barrow of Deers". The barrows has not been dated with certainty, but are thought to have been constructed in the Nordic Bronze Age. Along with Jelshøj, the highest natural point in Aarhus municipality, these pre-historic barrows are among the rare few left in the municipality, but are now all protected by law.

Hjortshøj has its own soccer team called Virup IF.

== Ecovillage AiH ==
Andelssamfundet i Hjortshøj (AiH) is a co-owned ecovillage in the outskirts of Hjortshøj. The association was initiated in 1987 and the first constructions began in 1992. AiH is now home to c. 300 people.

== Gallery ==
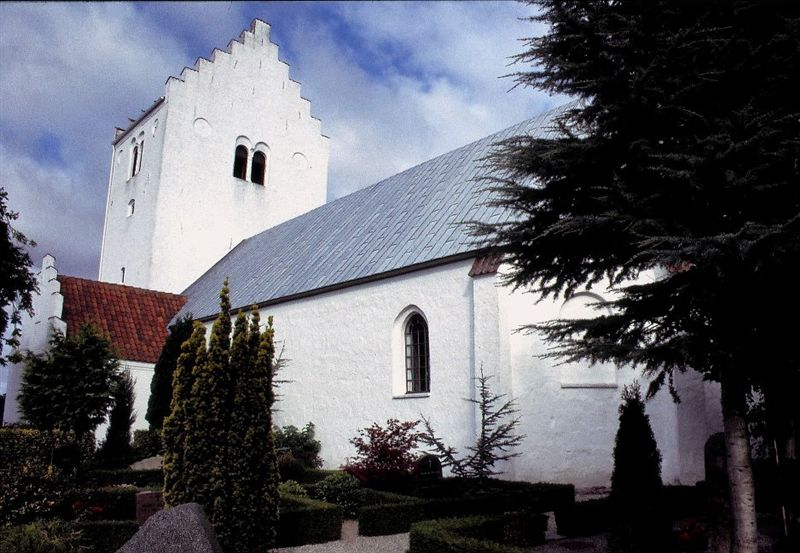
Hjortshøj church

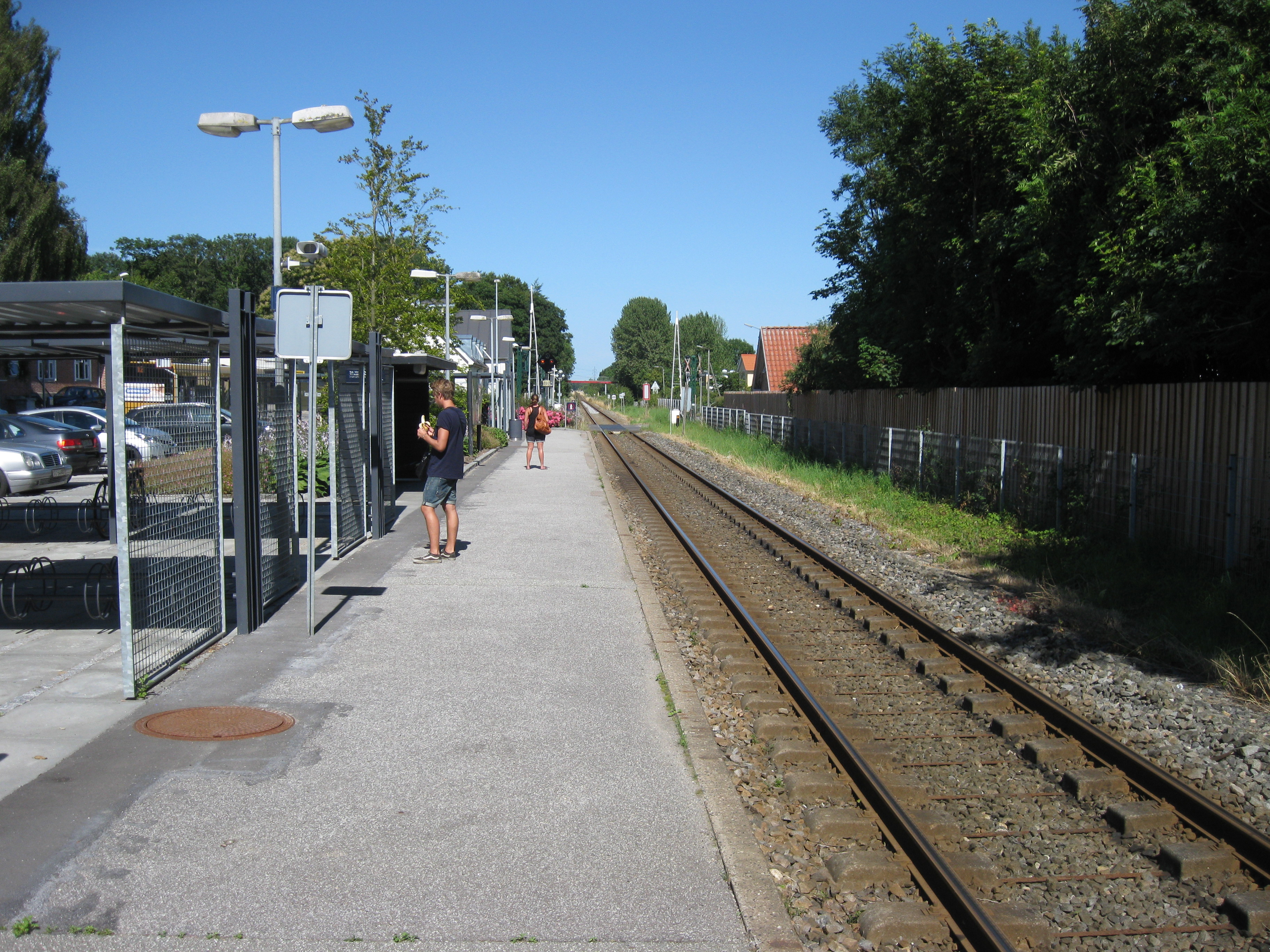
Hjortshøj train station
