= Aarhus Municipality =

Aarhus Municipality Aarhus Kommune (Danish)
- Municipality
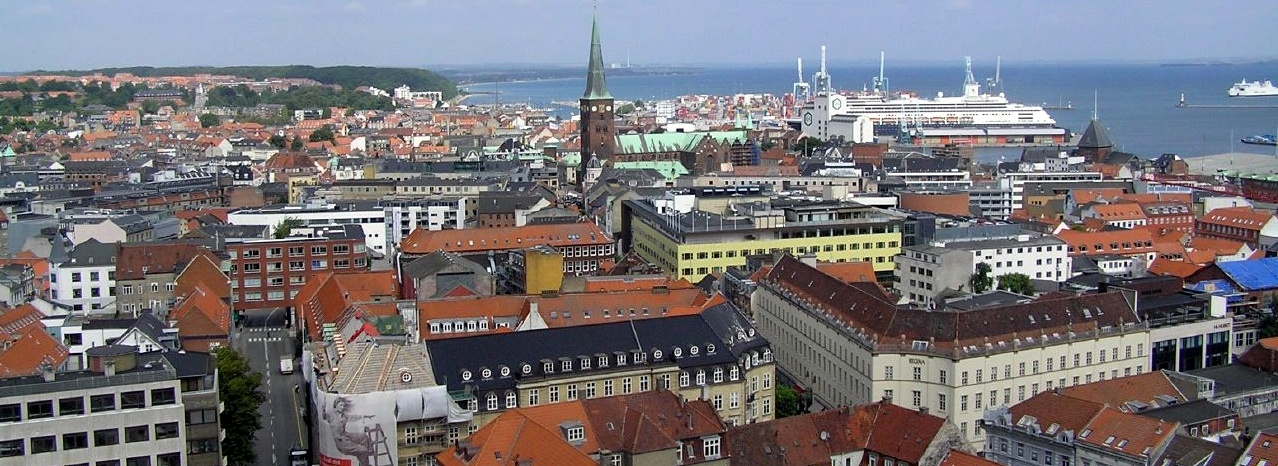

- Coat of arms

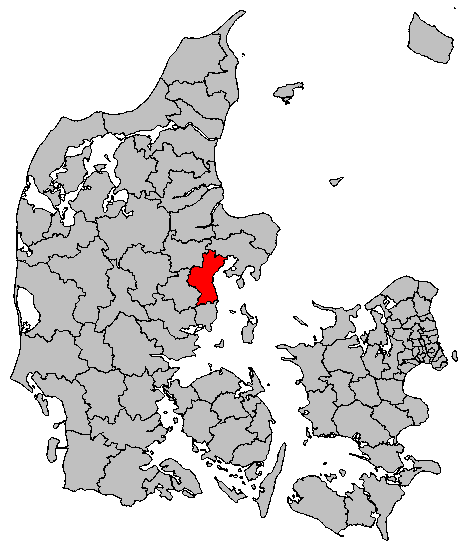
- Coordinates: 56°10′00″N 10°15′00″E
- Country: Denmark
- Region: Central Denmark
- Seat: Aarhus

Government
  - Mayor: Anders Winnerskjold

Area
  - Total: 469.56 km^{2} (181.30 sq mi)

Population (1. January 2026)
  - Total: 378,361
  - Density: 805.78/km^{2} (2,087.0/sq mi)
- Time zone: UTC1 (CET)
  - Summer (DST): UTC2 (CEST)
- Website: www.aarhus.dk

Aarhus Municipality (Danish: Aarhus Kommune), known as Århus Municipality (Danish: Århus Kommune) until 2011, is a kommune in the Central Denmark Region, on the east coast of the Jutland peninsula in central Denmark.

The municipality covers an area of 469.56 km^{2} (181.30 sq mi), and has a population of 378,361 as of 2026. The main town and the site of its municipal council is the city of Aarhus. Neighbouring municipalities are Syddjurs to the north, Favrskov to the northwest, Skanderborg to the southwest, and Odder to the south.

Aarhus Municipality was not merged with other municipalities in the nationwide Kommunalreformen ("The Municipal Reform" of 2007) due to its already relatively large size and population.

The municipality is part of Business Region Aarhus and of the East Jutland metropolitan area, which had a total population of 1.378 million in 2016.

== Politics ==
Aarhus City Council (Aarhus Byråd) is also the municipal government. The city council consists of 31 members elected for four-year terms. Administratively the municipality is divided into six minor agencies which together constitute the magistrate led by a mayor and five aldermen as administrative directors. It is the only Danish city with a magistrate structure. The six departments of the city are the Mayor's Department, Social Affairs and Employment, Technical Services and Environment, Health and Care, Culture and Citizens Services and Children and Young People which handle all the day-to-day operations of the city.

The current mayor of Aarhus municipality is Jacob Bundsgaard of the Social Democrats, who took over after Nicolai Wammen in August 2011, with Wammen wanting to focus on the upcoming election for Parliament.

Politically Aarhus leans left and the largest political party has historically been the Social Democratic Party which has also held the mayor's office for all terms with the notable exception of the 2001–2005 term when Louise Gade of Venstre became both the first female and non-Social Democratic mayor. The gender composition of the city council has risen steadily in favour of women through the 20th century and currently 9 of 31 members are women.

The first publicly elected mayor of Aarhus was appointed in 1919. In the 1970 Danish Municipal Reform the current Aarhus municipality was created by merging 20 municipalities. Aarhus (from 1948 to 2011 spelled Århus) was the seat of Århus County (spelled Århus all the years it existed) until the 2007 Danish municipal reform, which substituted the Danish counties with five regions and made the former Århus County a part of Central Denmark Region (Region Midtjylland), seated in Viborg.

=== Municipal council ===
Aarhus' municipal council consists of 31 members, elected every four years.

Below are the municipal councils elected since the Municipal Reform of 1970.

Election	Party																Total seats	Turnout	Elected mayor
Election	A	B	C	D	D	F	G	I	K	K	O	V	Y	Z	Ø	Å	Total seats	Turnout	Elected mayor
1970	17	2	8			1						3					31	70.3%	Bernhardt Jensen (A)
1974	13	2	4			2			2	1		4	1	2			31	58.1%	Orla Hyllested (A)
1978	13	2	5			3			2			3	1	2			31	68.7%	Orla Hyllested (A)
1981	11	1	6	1		5			1			3	2	1			31	68.6%	Thorkild Simonsen (A)
1985	12	1	7			7	1					2	1				31	65.6%	Thorkild Simonsen (A)
1989	12	1	5	1		6						3		1	2		31	63.1%	Thorkild Simonsen (A)
1993	15	1	3			4						6		1	1		31	68.4%	Thorkild Simonsen (A)
1997	13	1	3			4					2	7			1		31	70.5%	Flemming Knudsen (A)
2001	11	2	2			3					1	11			1		31	85.1%	Louise Gade (V)
2005	13	2	1			2					1	11			1		31	71.8%	Nicolai Wammen (A)
2009	14	1	3			5					2	5			1		31	63.7%	Nicolai Wammen (A)
2013	13	2	2			2		1			2	6			3		31	70.5%	Jacob Bundsgaard (A)
2017	13	2	1			3		1			2	6			2	1	31	70.5%	Jacob Bundsgaard (A)
2021	10	3	5		1	4					1	4			3		31	68.2%	Jacob Bundsgaard (A)
2025	10	2	3			5		2			1	4			3		31	71.6%	Anders Winnerskjold(A)
Data from Kmdvalg.dk, Dst.dk and Aarhus.dk

=== Districts and subdivisions ===
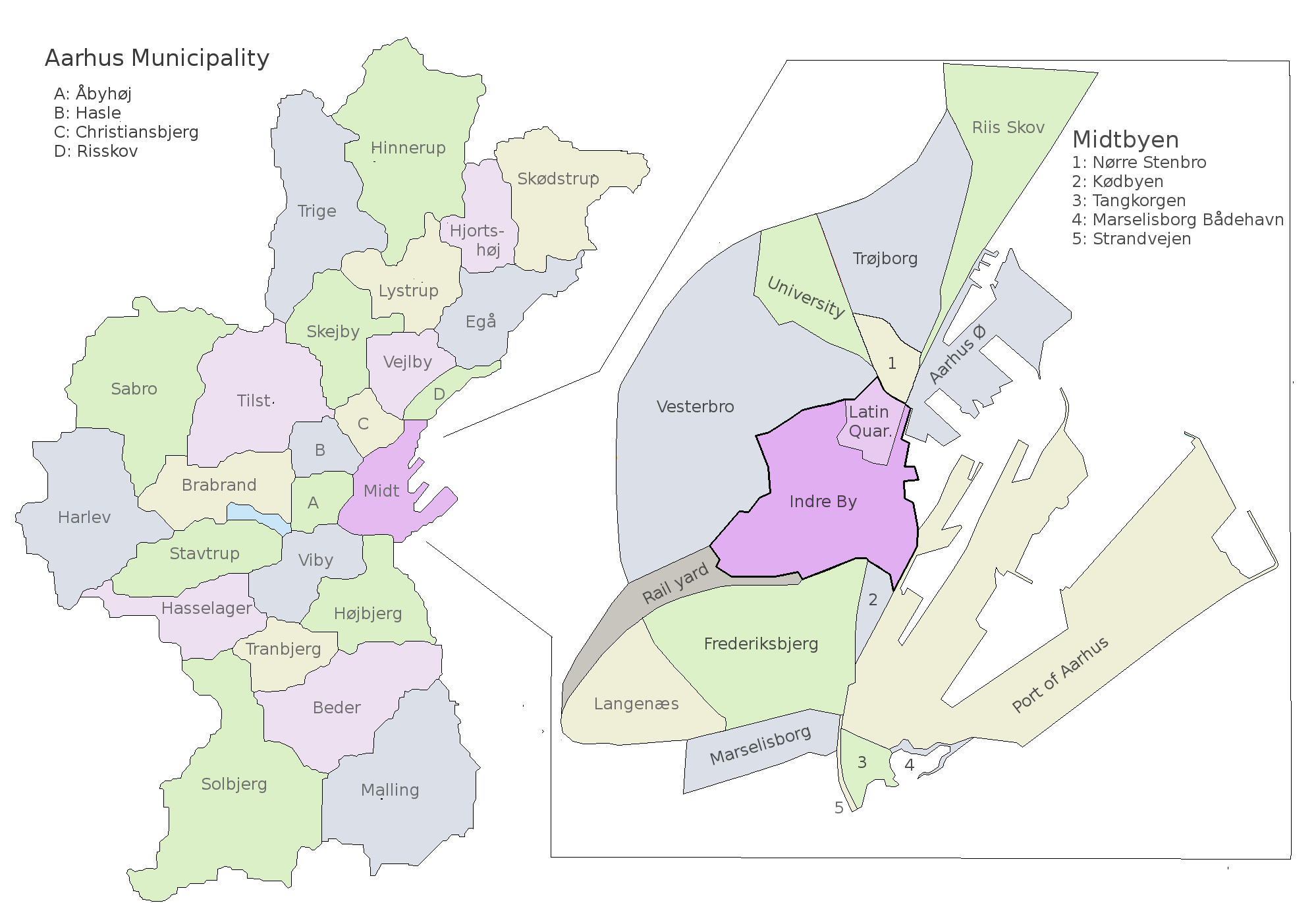
Locator map of districts in Aarhus municipality and neighbourhoods in Midtbyen

Aarhus Municipality has 45 electoral wards and polling stations in four electoral districts for the folketing. The diocese of Aarhus has four deaneries composed of 60 parishes within Aarhus municipality. Aarhus municipality contains 21 postal districts and some parts of another 9. The urban area of Aarhus and the immediate suburbs are divided into the districts Aarhus C, Aarhus N, Aarhus V, Viby J, Højbjerg and Brabrand.

Aarhus is segmented into districts on different levels often containing several distinct neighbourhoods within them. The historical centre, known as Indre By (lit. English, "Inner City"), includes the neighbourhoods Centralværkstedet, the Latin Quarter and the areas around the Central Station and Aarhus Concert Hall. The inner city beltway Ring 1 contains the larger district Midtbyen (lit. Town Centre), roughly equivalent to postal district Aarhus C, and is composed of the neighbourhoods Indre By, Vesterbro, Frederiksbjerg, Aarhus Ø, Marselisborg and Nørre Stenbro.

North of the inner beltway lies the district Aarhus N, containing the neighbourhoods Trøjborg, Risskov, Vejlby, Skejby, Christiansbjerg and Vorrevangen and to the west lies Langenæs, Åbyhøj and Aarhus V, comprising the neighbourhoods Hasle, Frydenlund, Herredsvang and Møllevangen, while the district of Højbjerg lies to the south. Districts and suburbs further out are Brabrand, Egå, Gellerup, Hasselager, Holme, Kolt, Rosenhøj, Skødstrup, Skæring, Skåde, Slet, Stavtrup, Tilst and Tranbjerg.

== Cities and towns ==
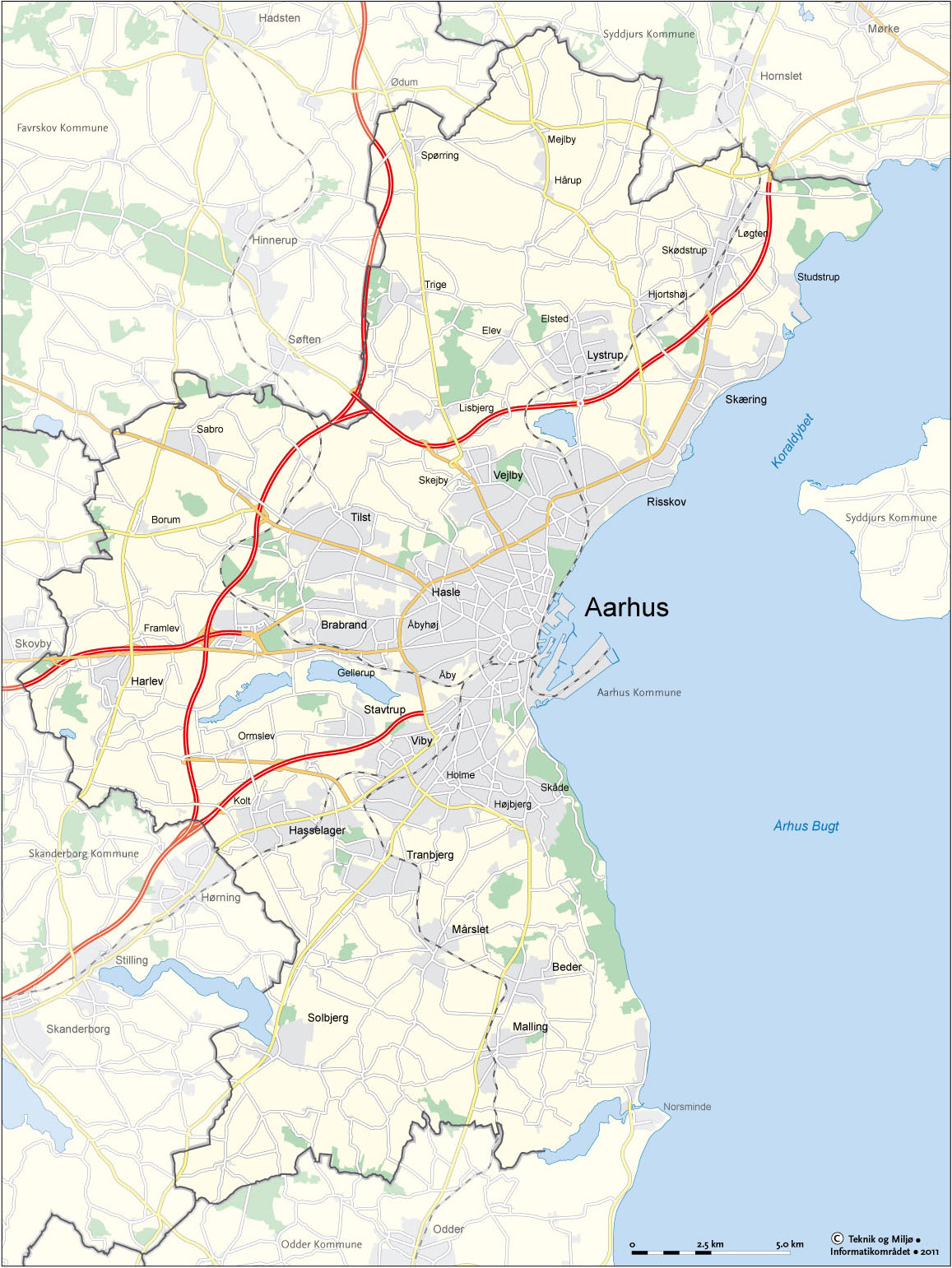
Municipal map

Statistics Denmark defines towns or cities as areas with more than 200 residents in a continuous settlement with no more than 200 meters between residential structures. 1 January 2020 there were 19 such areas in Aarhus Municipality, the largest being the city of Aarhus with a population of 280,534, while some 50,000 people lived in urban areas elsewhere in the municipality. The city of Aarhus is the second largest urban area in Denmark, the principal port on the east coast of Jutland, and the seat of Denmark's second-largest bishopric. In 2013 Beder and Malling was officially counted as a single urban area for the first time. Towns in the municipality are generally considered satellites of Aarhus.

Aarhus	280,000
Lystrup	10,400
Beder-Malling	8,900
Løgten	8,500
Mårslet	5,000

Solbjerg	4,500
Harlev	3,900
Hjortshøj	3,700
Sabro	3,300
Trige	3,100

Elev	1,500
Lisbjerg	1,000
Spørring	1,000
Studstrup	840
Hårup	810

Mejlby	410
Mundelstrup	400
Ormslev	350
Borum	300

Population figures from Statistics Denmark, 1 January 2020.

== Twin towns – sister cities ==
Aarhus is twinned with:

- Bergen, Norway (1946)
- Gothenburg, Sweden (1946)
- Harbin, China (1984)
- Kiel, Germany (2019)
- Kujalleq, Greenland (1962)
- Rostock, Germany (2006)
- Turku, Finland (1946)
- Lviv, Ukraine (2023)

Formerly, Saint Petersburg was twinned with Aarhus, but following the 2022 Russian Invasion of Ukraine, this relationship was terminated on 9. March 2022.

== Sources ==
- Municipal statistics: NetBorger Kommunefakta, delivered from KMD aka Kommunedata (Municipal Data)
- Municipal mergers and neighbors: Eniro map with named municipalities
