= Tranbjerg J =

Tranbjerg
- Neighborhood
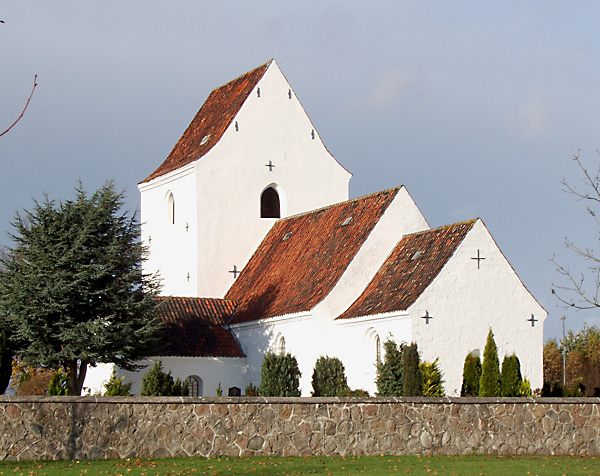
- Tranbjerg Church

- Location within Denmark
- Coordinates: 56.06°N 10.09°E
- Country: Denmark
- Regions of Denmark: Central Denmark Region
- Municipality: Aarhus Municipality
- District: Tranbjerg
- Postal code: 8310

Tranbjerg J is a town in Aarhus in Denmark. "J" is for Jutland to distinguish this place from a similarly named place on Zealand, and is not used in daily parlance.

== History ==
Tranbjerg was formerly a small rural village but is now a suburb of Aarhus about 10 kilometers south of the city center. Tranbjerg Church is a typical old Danish village church, built in the later part of the 1100s, but with several later adjustments and additions. It is dedicated to Saint Ursula and the eleven thousand handmaidens. In 1737, King Christian VI gave charter to the Tranbjerg parish for the public school of Tranbjerg Skole. The school was placed right next to the church, but newer and larger schoolbuildings were erected elsewhere in the 1970s. In 2013, Tranbjerg Skole and Grønløkkeskolen - another local public school - merged to form the Tranbjergskolen public school. Tranbjerg has a relatively extant center known as Center Syd (Center South). It developed in the later part of the 1800s, after Tranbjerg railway station opened in 1884. The train station transformed the village to a railway town, attracting industry and improving the trade options for local farmers. Tranbjerg Kro was built in 1885. The train station was rebuilt and modernised in 1993.

Tranbjerg Brugsforening, a local cooperative retailer, opened in 1918 as the cooperative idea flourished and took hold in Denmark. Kvickly Tranbjerg is built on the site of the former Tranbjerg Brugsforening headquarters.

The local sports association of AIA-Tranbjerg was also initiated in 1918 as a local department of the larger AIA (Arbejdernes Idrætsklub, Aarhus). Football has played a prominent role in the history of AIA-Tranbjerg.

In 1970, Tranbjerg became part of Aarhus Municipality.

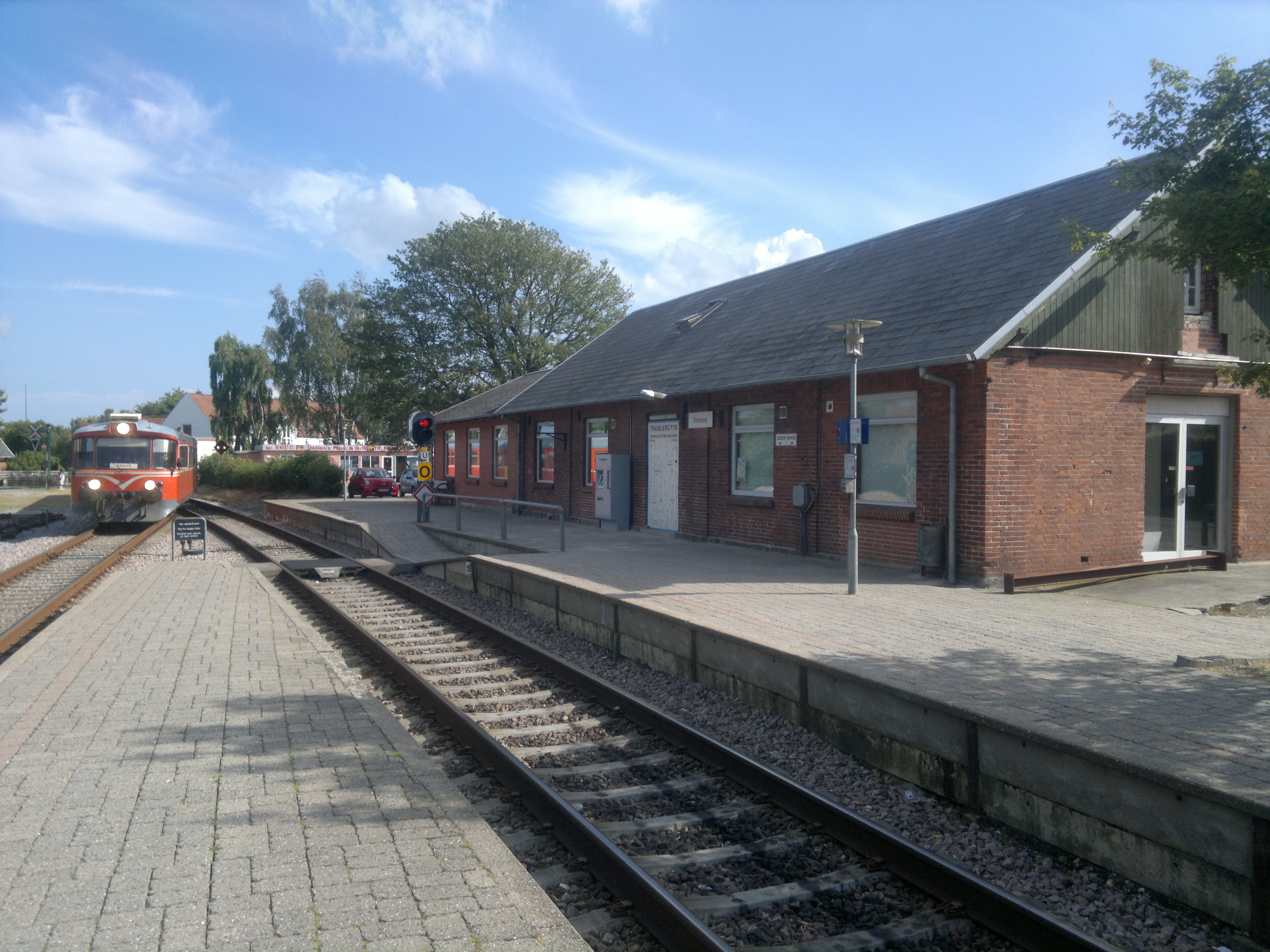
Tranbjerg train station

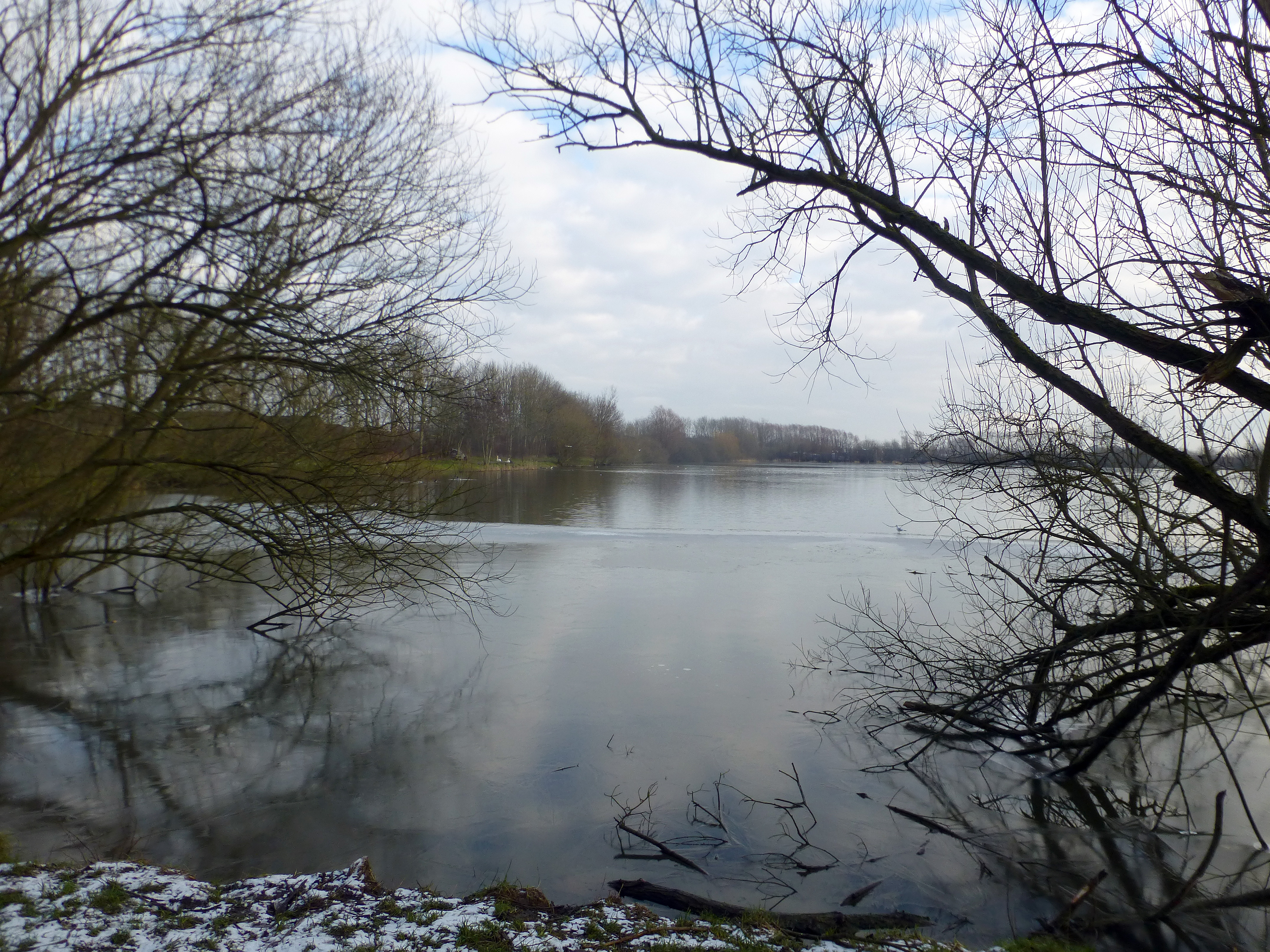
Tranbjerg lake

== Sources ==
- Tranbjerg J at GEOnet Names Server
- Olaf B. Knudsen. "Tranbjerg - fra landsby til forstad" (PDF) (in Danish). Tranbjerg Lokalhistoriske Samling.
- Jens Mikkelsen: "Tranbjerg - før og nu: en uhøjtidelig beretning om folk og fæ gennem tiderne i - og omkring Tranbjerg", Tranbjergs Historie (1984)
- Jens Mikkelsen og Niels Johansen: "Tranbjerg - før og nu", Eget Forlag (1984)

Preceding station	Aarhus Letbane	Following station
Nørrevænget towards Odder	Line 2	Gunnar Clausensvej towards Lisbjergskolen or Lystrup
