= Hasselager =

- Neighborhood
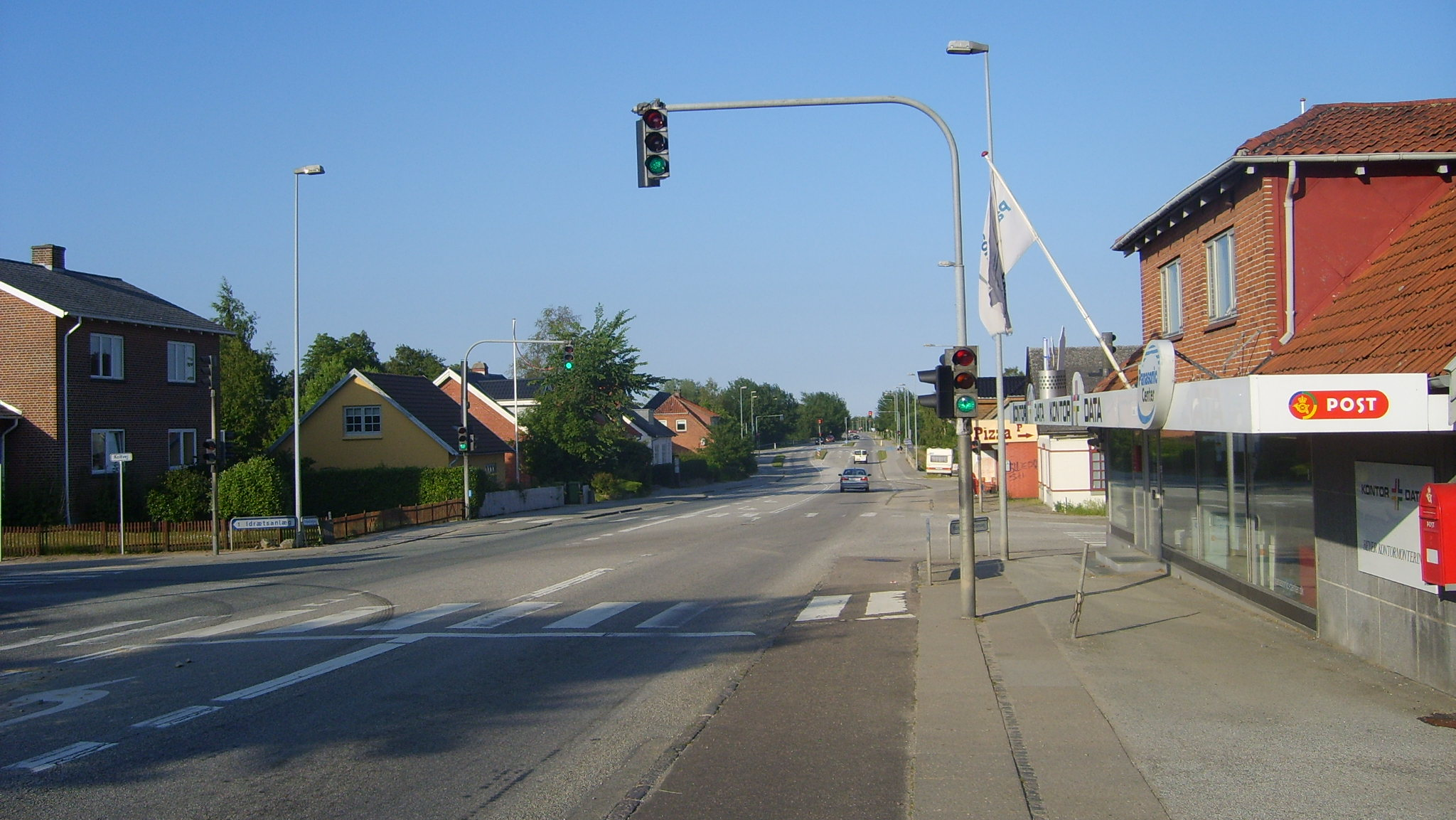
- Hasselager. The main road of Hovedvejen.

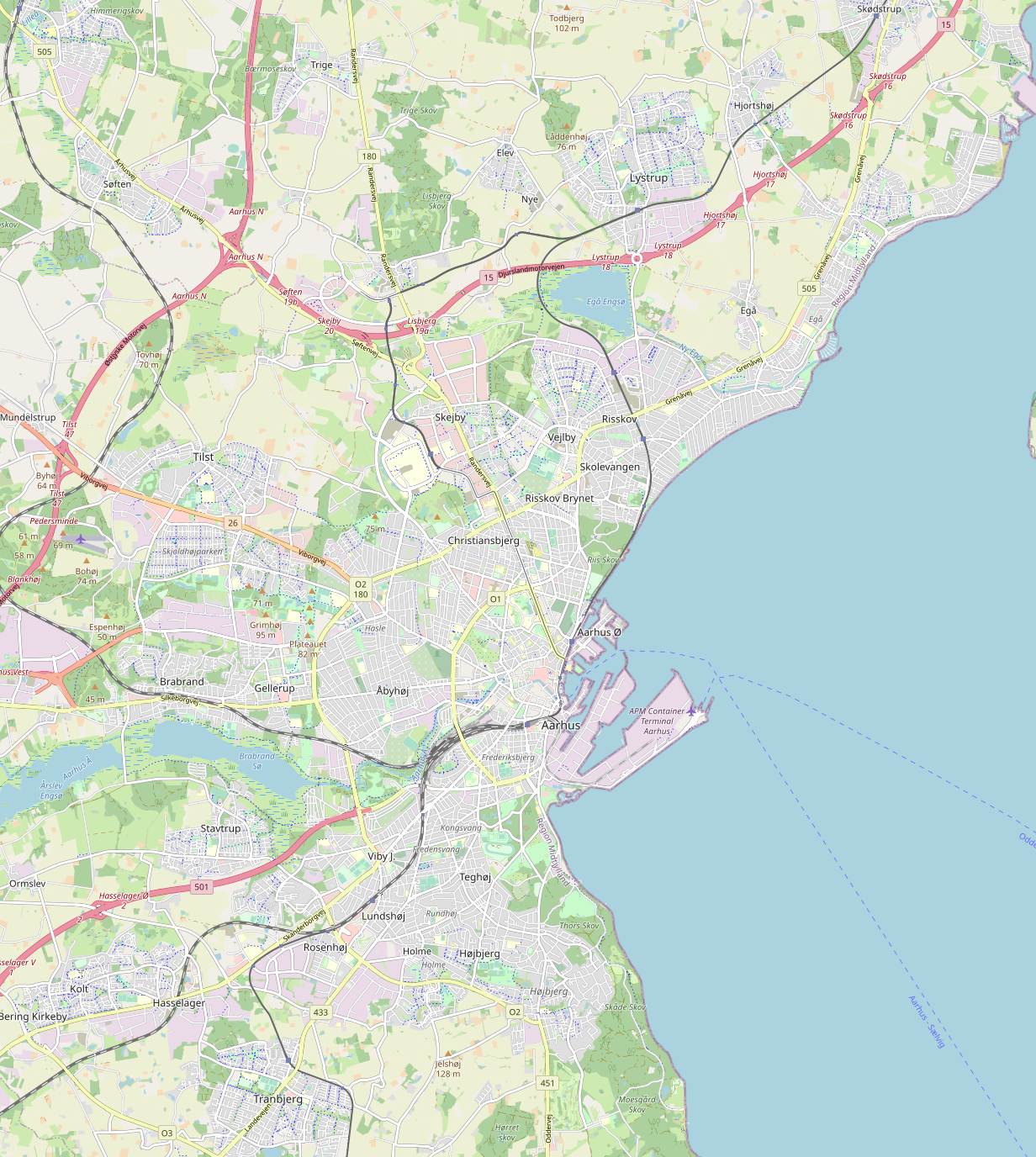
- Location within Aarhus
- Coordinates: 56.102164°N 10.088677°E
- Country: Kingdom of Denmark
- Regions of Denmark: Central Denmark Region
- Municipality: Aarhus Municipality
- District: Brabrand
- Postal code: 8361

Hasselager is a small suburban area in the south-western part of Aarhus in Denmark. It is about 8 km from the city center and has approximately 7,437 (2018) residents, mostly of Danish heritage.

Hasselager has largely merged with neighbouring area Kolt in modern times, and the two are collectively known and referred to as Kolt-Hasselager, with shared postal code 8361. The area is predominantly residential and includes the Hasselhøj development, but also contains a large industrial park.

== Sources ==
- Ormslev Kolt Lokalhistoriske samling: Hasselager, archives on local history (in Danish)
