= Jacob Bundsgaard =

Danish politician

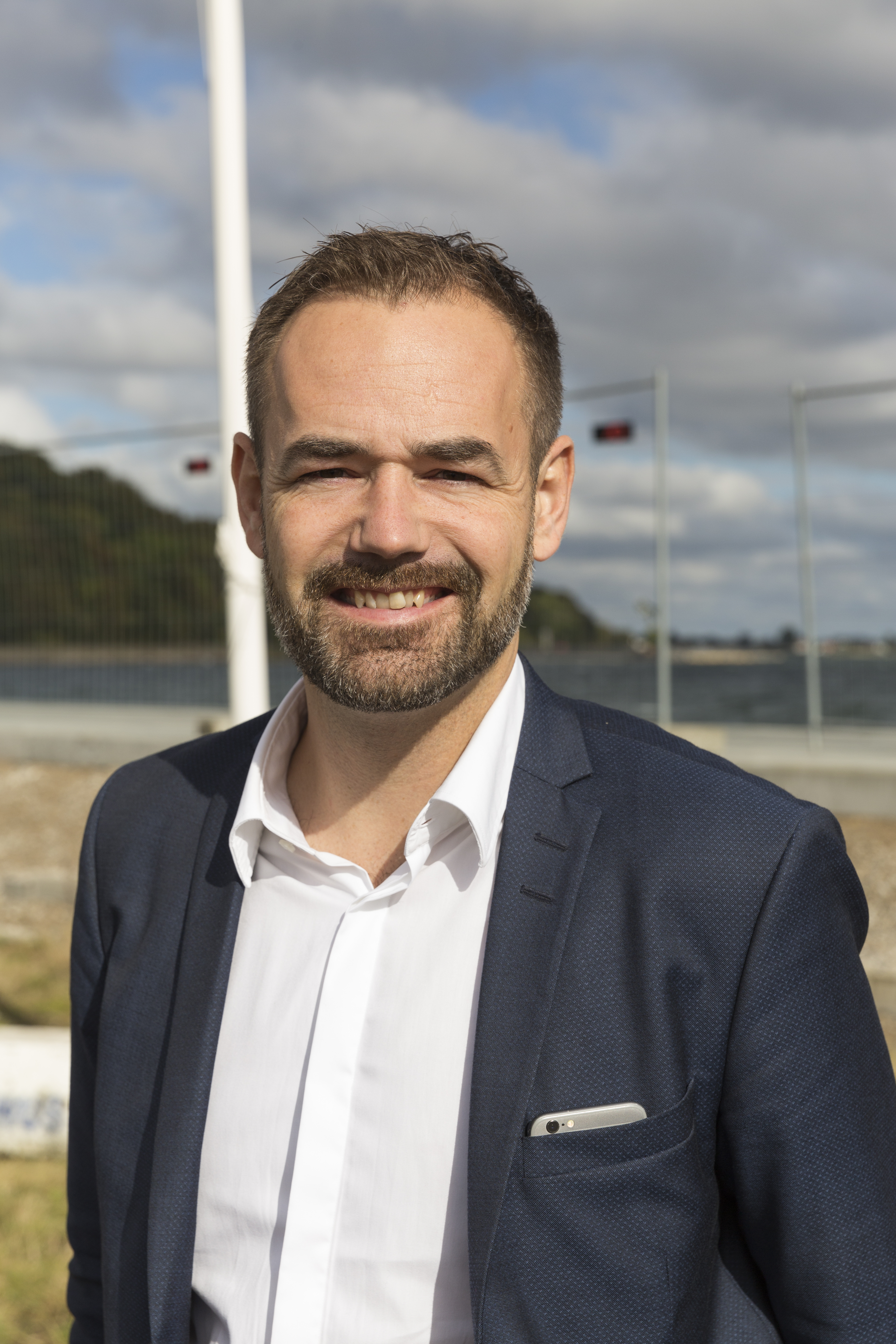

Mayor of Aarhus Municipality
- In office 11 August 2011 – 23 October 2024
- Preceded by: Nicolai Wammen (A)
- Succeeded by: Anders Winnerskjold (A)

Personal details
- Born: 28 February 1976 (age 50) Aarhus, Denmark
- Party: Social Democrats

Jacob Bundsgaard Johansen (born 28 February 1976) is a Danish politician and is the former Mayor of Aarhus Municipality. He is a member of the Danish Social Democrats. He took over after the former mayor Nicolai Wammen, who resigned as mayor to become member of the Danish Parliament, Folketinget, in 2011.

== See also ==
- List of mayors of Aarhus

Political offices
Preceded by Nicolai Wammen	Mayor of Aarhus; 2011–Present	Succeeded by
