= Trige =

- Town
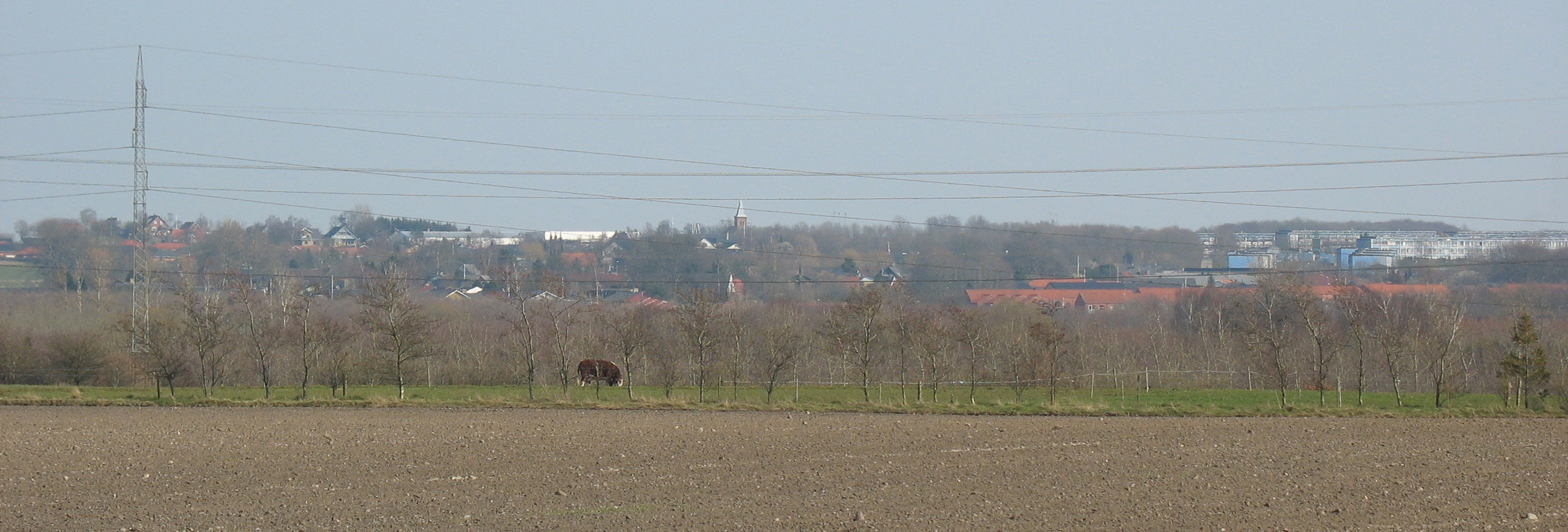
- Trige seen from west

- Location in Denmark Trige (Central Denmark Region)
- Coordinates: 56°15′11″N 10°8′50″E
- Country: Denmark
- Region: Central Denmark Region
- Municipality: Aarhus Municipality

Area
  - Urban: 1.5 km^{2} (0.58 sq mi)

Population (2026)
  - Urban: 3,476
  - Urban density: 2,300/km^{2} (6,000/sq mi)
- Time zone: UTC+1 (CET)
  - Summer (DST): UTC+2 (CEST)
- Postal code: DK-8380 Trige

Trige is a town and suburb of Aarhus in Denmark. It has a population of 3,476 (1 January 2026).

Bærmoseskov is a newly raised 80 hectare woodland at the outskirts of Trige, part of the New Forests of Aarhus.

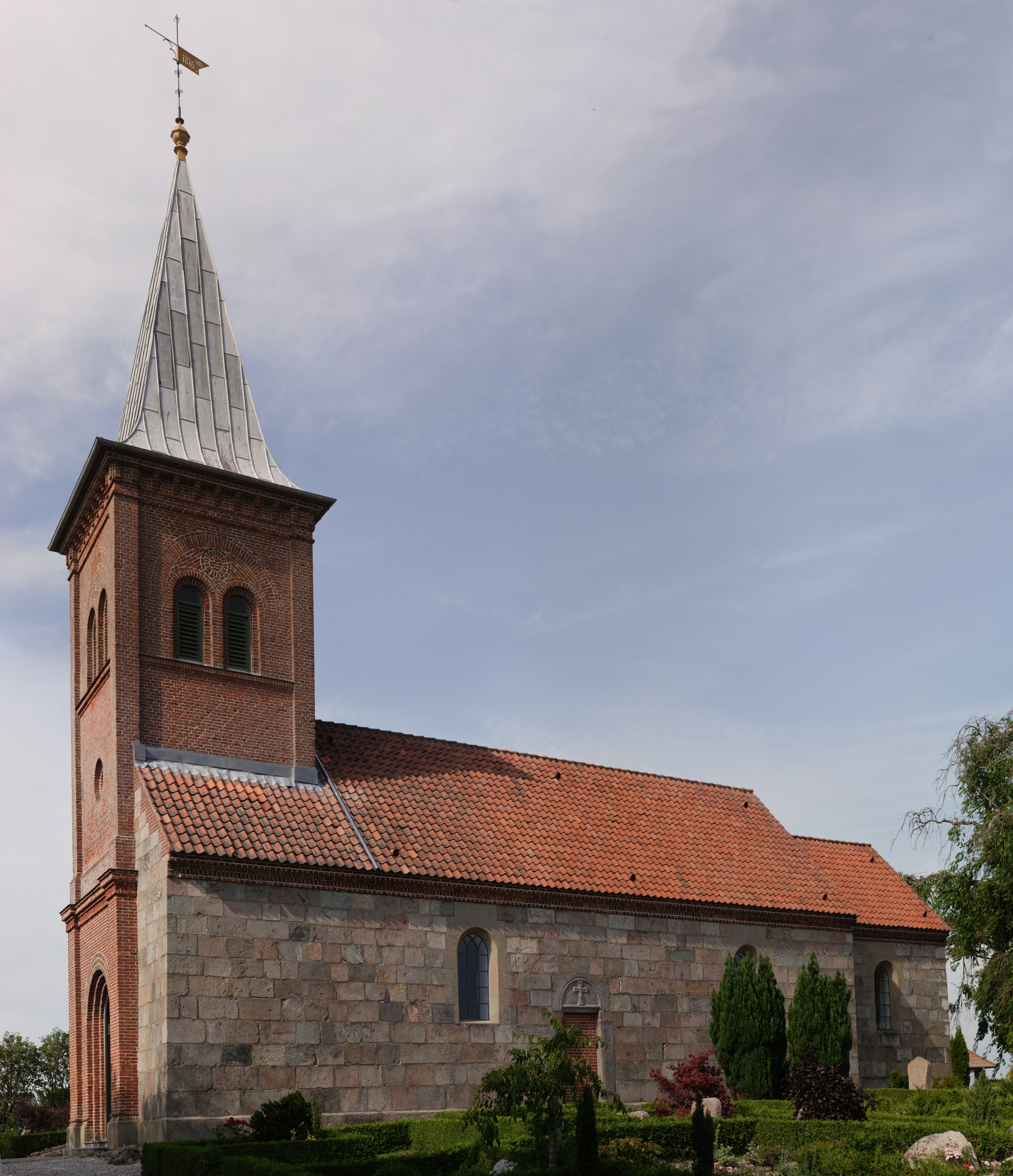
Trige church

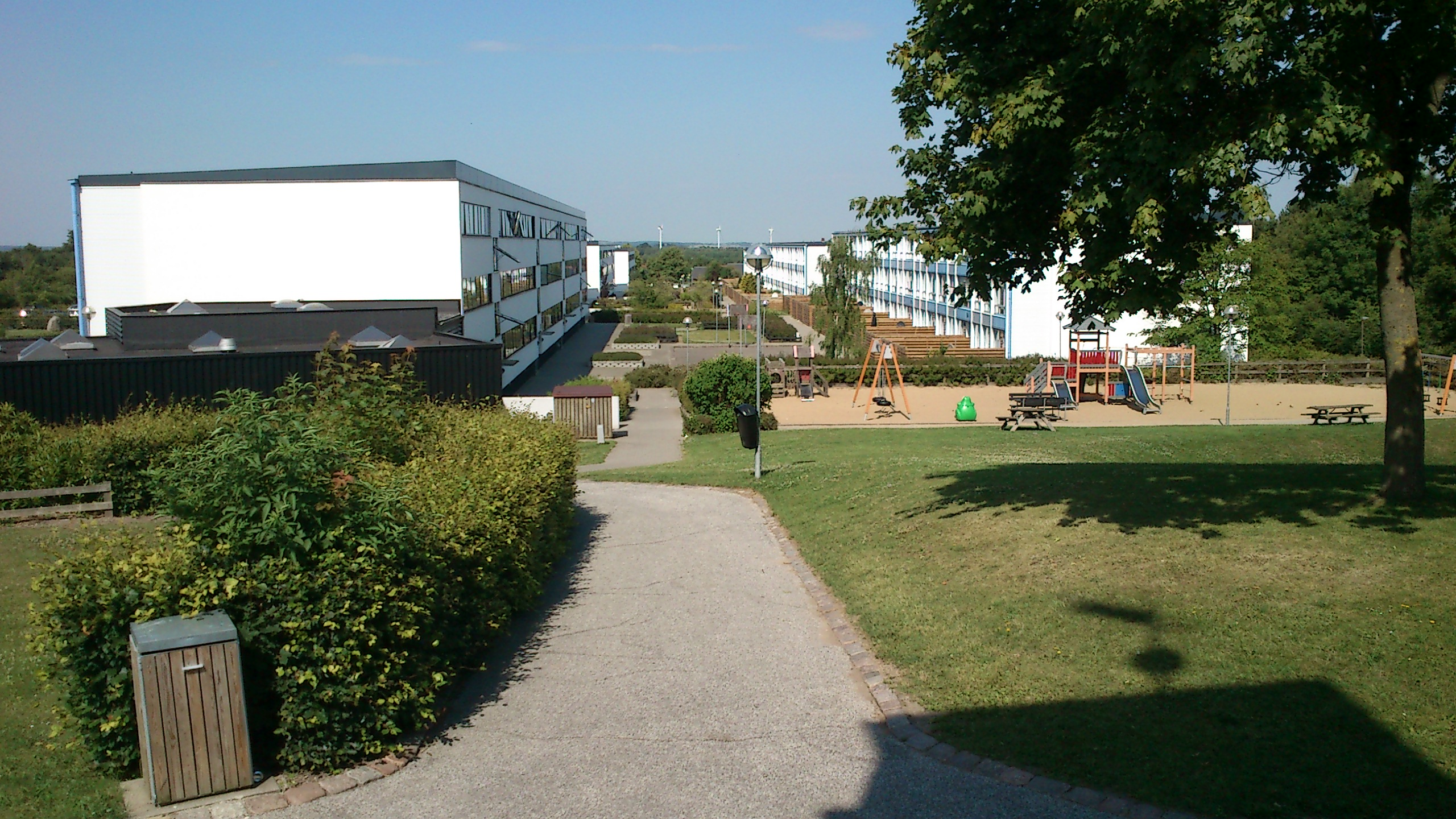
Trigeparken, a large public housing project

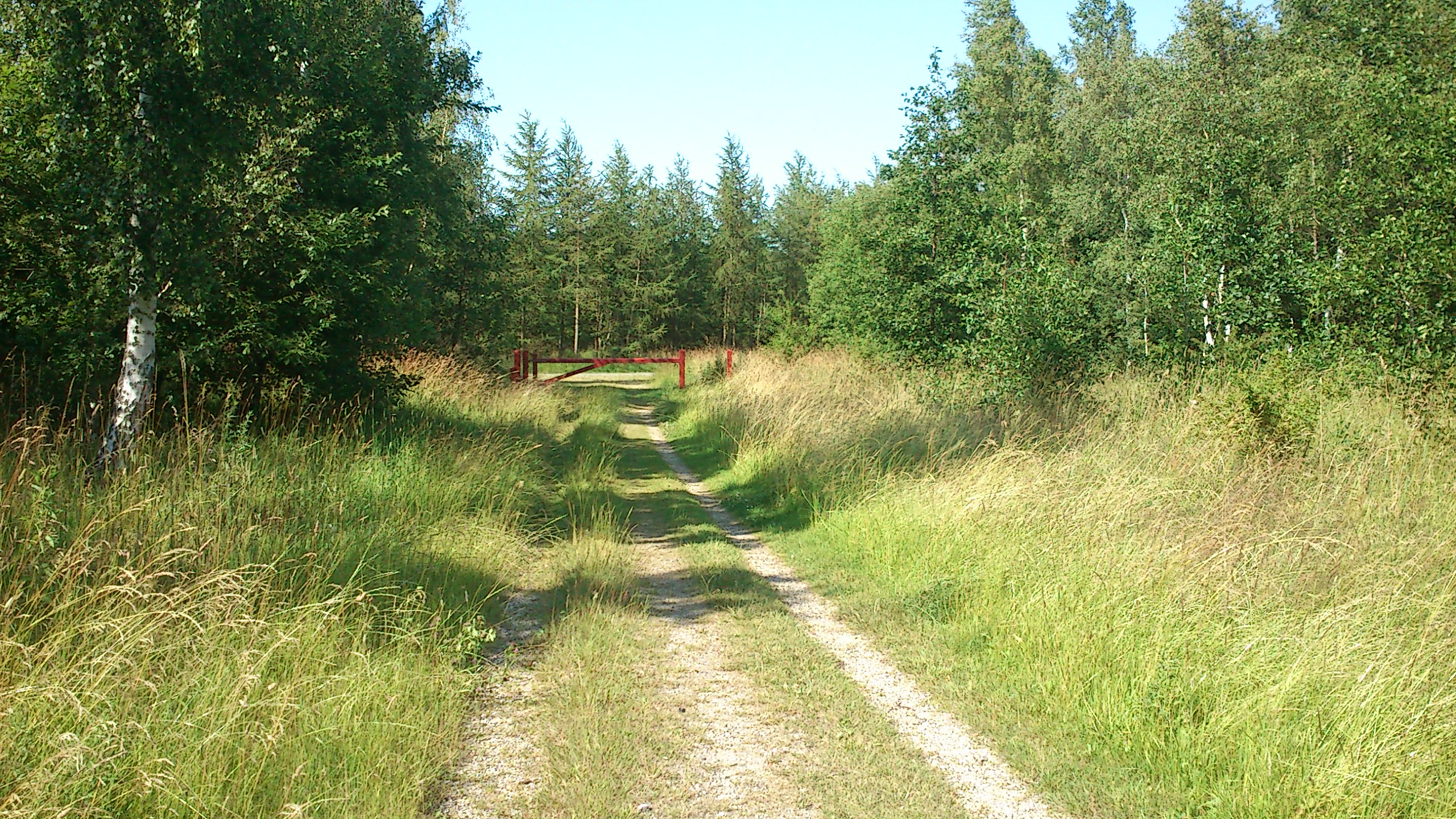
Bærmoseskov a newly raised woodland
