= List of towns and cities in Aarhus Municipality =

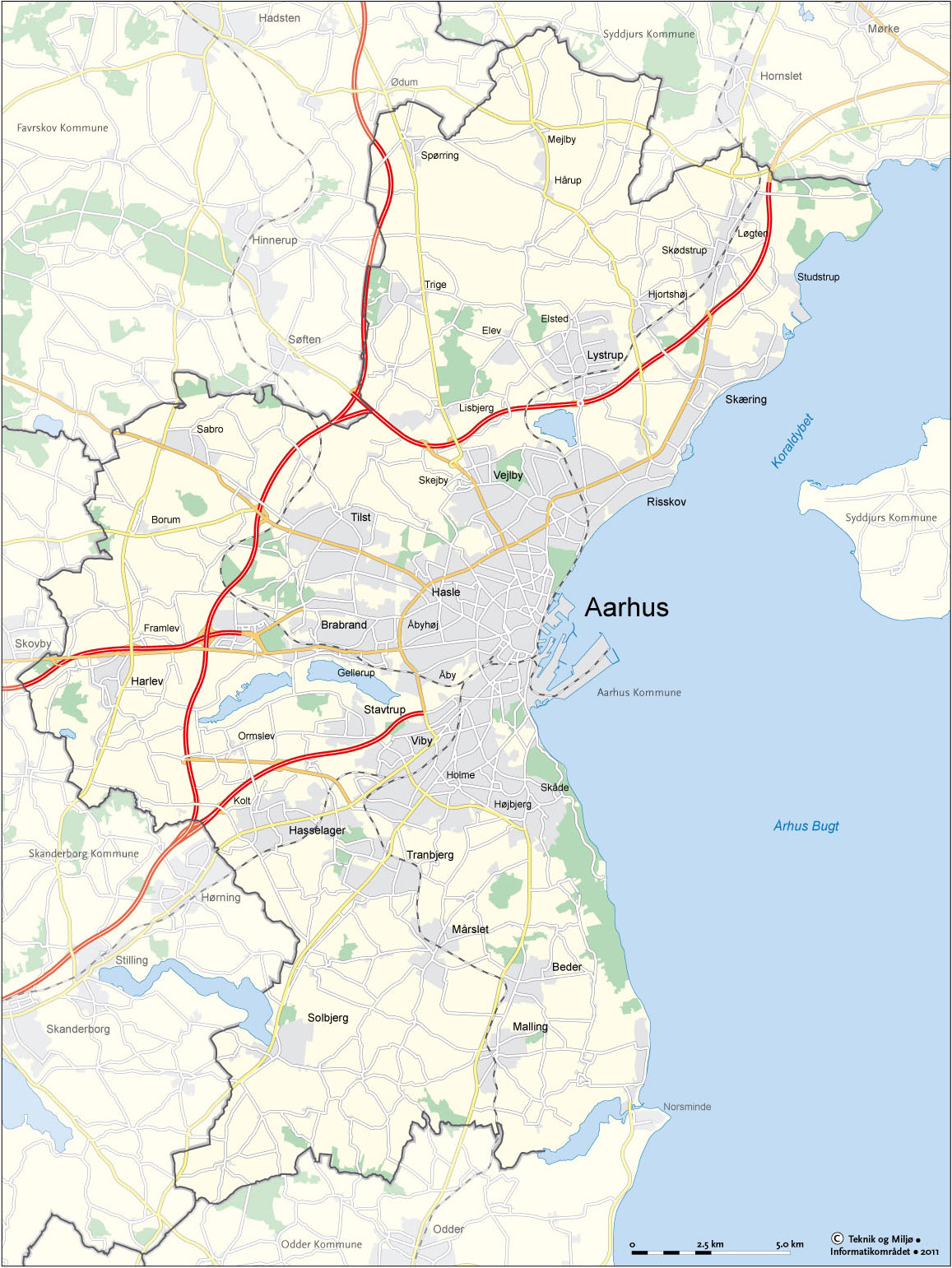
Municipal map

Statistics Denmark defines towns or cities as areas with more than 200 residents in a continuous settlement with no more than 200 meters between residential structures. In 2016 there were 20 such areas in Aarhus Municipality, the largest being the city of Aarhus with some 260.000 inhabitants while some 50.000 people lived in urban areas elsewhere in the municipality. In 2013 Beder and Malling were officially counted as a single conurbation for the first time. Towns in the municipality are generally considered satellites of Aarhus.

Population by year

Name	2010	2011	2012	2013	2014	2015	2016	2017	2018	2019	2020	2021	2022	Coords
Aarhus Municipality	306650	310956	314545	319094	323893	326246	330639	335684	340421	345332	349983	352751	355238	56°09′N 10°12′E
Aarhus	242914	249709	252213	256018	259754	261570	264716	269022	273077	277086	280534	282910	285273	56°09′N 10°12′E
Lystrup	10027	10363	10380	10376	10362	10341	10378	10436	10477	10425	10419	10392	10273	56°14′15.4″N 10°14′10.8″E
Beder-Malling	0	0	0	8131	8194	8325	8365	8387	8452	8597	8898	9034	9045	56°02′58.3″N 10°11′59.6″E
Løgten	6207	6334	6687	6967	7061	7335	7704	7894	8003	8197	8541	8619	8659	56°16′04.2″N 10°18′29.0″E
Mårslet	4379	4481	4530	4772	4810	4877	4881	4905	5007	5043	5036	5014	5004	56°04′07.3″N 10°09′44.8″E
Solbjerg	3139	3144	3270	3446	3505	3551	3646	3765	3973	4218	4466	4550	4240	56°02′28.1″N 10°05′23.4″E
Harlev	3508	3563	3648	3688	3691	3718	3707	3759	3755	3785	3884	3983	3990	56°08′42.4″N 9°59′49.9″E
Hjortshøj	2867	2876	2982	3047	3298	3463	3561	3562	3634	3669	3714	3654	3590	56°14′54.1″N 10°16′11.1″E
Sabro	2474	2501	2640	2741	2807	2825	2928	2964	2978	3225	3300	3309	3330	56°12′41.7″N 10°02′12.5″E
Trige	2701	2738	2748	2799	2847	2864	2869	2878	2858	2810	3096	3193	3191	56°15′04.9″N 10°08′36.4″E
Elev	932	986	1014	1010	1110	1188	1215	1307	1352	1458	1539	1569	1665	56°14′22.9″N 10°11′51.7″E
Lisbjerg	789	812	807	811	839	838	857	846	994	1057	1029	1030	1063	56°13′17.0″N 10°09′58.0″E
Spørring	927	946	953	936	965	976	986	994	1020	1020	1008	1026	1052	56°17′51.4″N 10°08′52.5″E
Hårup	758	775	767	763	749	763	806	811	807	823	814	810	857	56°17′11.1″N 10°13′04.1″E
Studstrup	890	891	883	879	853	854	851	857	849	873	842	838	827	56°15′28.6″N 10°20′30.7″E
Mundelstrup	430	441	464	399	386	396	395	405	397	387	400	399	412	56°11′51.8″N 10°03′51.1″E
Mejlby	320	339	448	436	447	432	454	441	425	431	409	410	409	56°18′03.1″N 10°12′44.8″E
Ormslev	304	311	327	324	329	349	340	344	339	351	354	357	353	56°07′31.8″N 10°03′35.0″E
Borum	364	356	355	329	326	330	321	309	315	305	303	308	300	56°11′16.5″N 10°00′45.0″E
Todbjerg	227	<200	<200	<200	<200	<200	204	201	204	200	0			56°16′04.1″N 10°12′27.1″E
Beder	4332	4350	4372	**										Beder-Malling since 2013
Malling	3462	3538	3694	**										Beder-Malling since 2013
Stavtrup	3729	*												Part of Aarhus since 2011

- Stavtrup was incorporated in Aarhus in 2011
  - In 2013 Malling and Beder officially merged to form the new town of Beder-Malling
