= Administrative divisions of Aarhus Municipality =

Aarhus Municipality is divided in many different ways, often on layered levels. Politically it is a part of the multi-member constituency Østjyllands Storkreds which covers the eastern coast of East Jutland from Randers to Vejle Fjord. Aarhus Municipality itself is divided in 4 folketing constituencies, Århus Sydkredsen, Århus Vestkredsen, Århus Nordkredsen, Århus Østkredsen, which are again divided in a total of 45 wards, each with one polling station. The diocese of Aarhus is divided in a number of deaneries of which 4 resides in Aarhus Municipality with a total of 58 parishes. Administratively Aarhus Municipality operates with 25 districts or local communities (Lokalsamfund) which can be amalgamations of parishes, neighborhoods or former and present towns. In addition there are 28 postal districts within the municipality, some of which are colloquially used to denote areas and neighborhoods in the city of Aarhus. The urban area and immediate suburbs of the city of Aarhus are divided in the postal (P.D.) districts Aarhus C, Aarhus N, Aarhus V, Viby J, Højbjerg, Brabrand and Risskov.

The municipality also contains official defined neighborhoods within districts, towns and cities. The city of Aarhus contains the district Midtbyen (lit. English, "Town Centre") within the inner city beltway Ringgaden; roughly equivalent to P.D. Aarhus C and the southern section of P.D. Aarhus N. Midtbyen is composed of the neighbourhoods Indre By, Vesterbro, Frederiksbjerg, Aarhus Ø, Marselisborg, Nørre Stenbro, Trøjborg, Langenæs and the University campus. The neighborhood Indre By (lit. English, "Inner City"), includes the areas around Centralværkstederne, the Central Station, Aarhus Concert Hall and the historical centre and neighborhood of the Latin Quarter.

Aarhus Municipality in addition use statistical districts which can cover individual settlements, developments or neighborhoods, school districts and elder districts (Ældreområder).

== Cities and towns ==
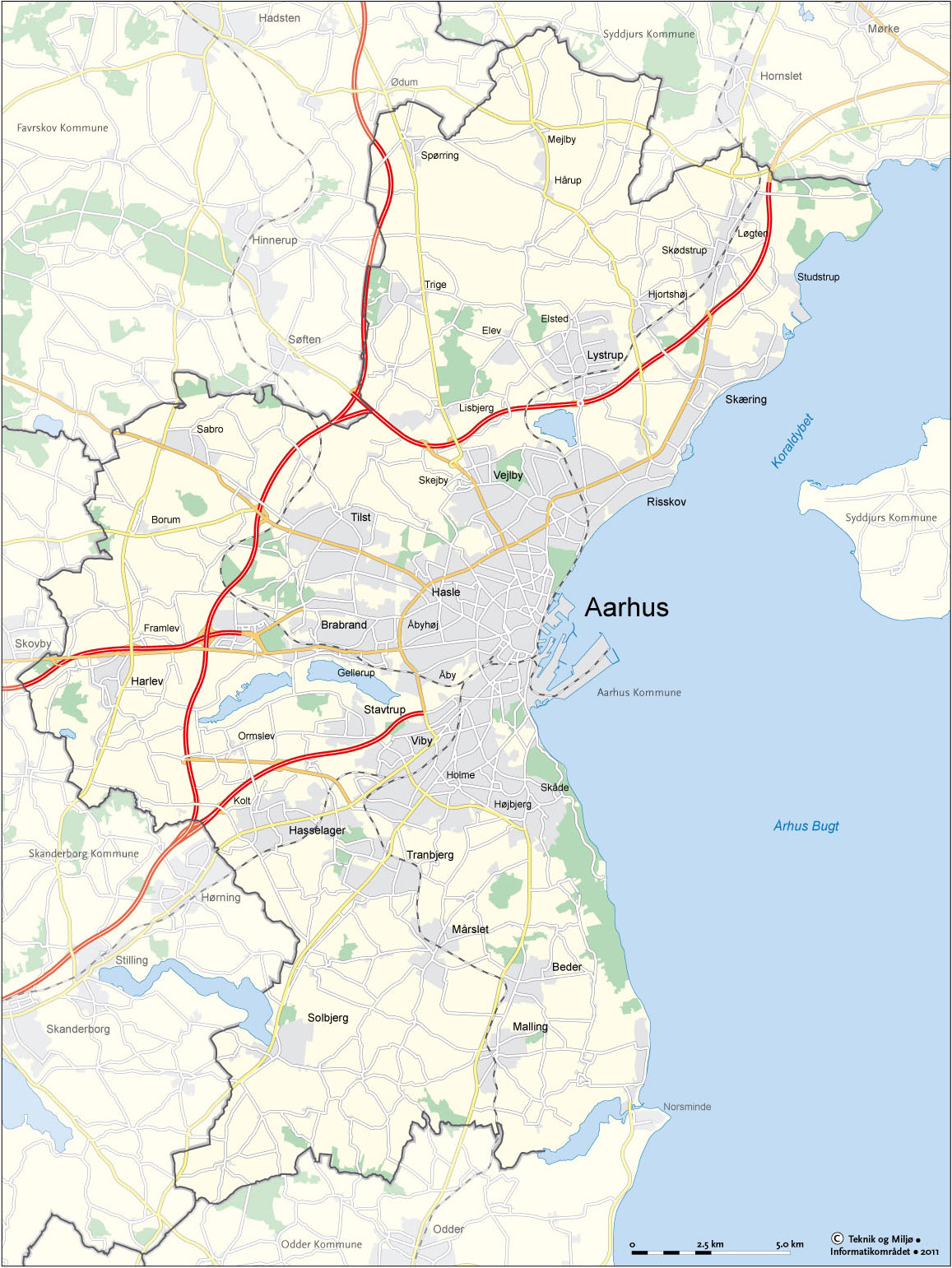
Municipal map

Statistics Denmark defines towns or cities as areas with more than 200 residents in a continuous settlement with no more than 200 meters between residential structures. 1 January 2019 there were 19 such areas in Aarhus Municipality, the largest being the city of Aarhus with a population of 277,086, while some 50.000 people lived in urban areas elsewhere in the municipality. In 2013 Beder and Malling was officially counted as a single conurbation for the first time. Towns in the municipality are generally considered satellites of Aarhus.

- Aarhus (277,086)
- Lystrup (10,425)
- Beder-Malling (8,597)
- Løgten (8,197)
- Mårslet (5,043)
- Solbjerg (4,218)
- Harlev (3,785)
- Hjortshøj (3,669)
- Sabro (3,225)
- Trige (2,810)
- Elev (1,458)
- Lisbjerg (1,057)
- Spørring (1,020)
- Studstrup (873)
- Hårup (823)
- Mejlby (431)
- Mundelstrup (387)
- Ormslev (351)
- Borum (305)

Population figures from Statistics Denmark, 1. January, 2019.

== Districts ==
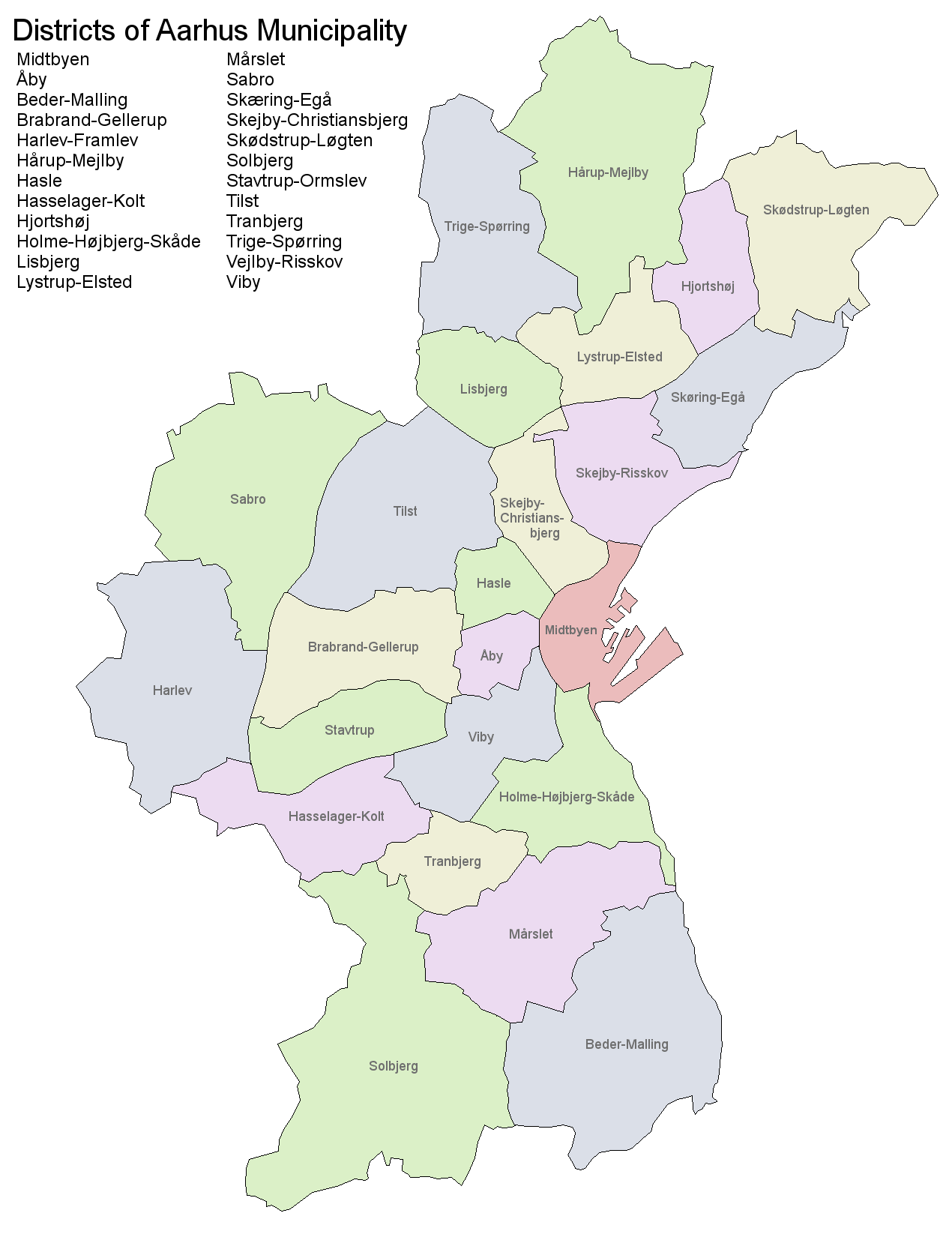
Districts of Aarhus Municipality

Aarhus Municipality defines 21 districts, termed Lokalsamfund, for administrative and statistical purposes, often based on geographical and historical conditions such as historical city limits, larger urban developments and former and existing towns. Several districts are amalgamations of former townships that over time have grown into a single entity or encompassing several suburbs or towns such as Holme-Højbjerg-Skåde which includes the former towns of Holme, Højbjerg and Skåde, all now neighborhoods in Aarhus in a single urban conurbation.

- Åby
- Beder-Malling
- Brabrand-Gellerup
- Harlev-Framlev
- Hårup-Mejlby
- Hasle
- Hasselager-Kolt
- Hjortshøj
- Holme-Højbjerg-Skåde
- Lisbjerg
- Lystrup-Elsted
- Mårslet
- Midtbyen
- Sabro
- Skæring-Egå
- Skejby-Christiansbjerg
- Skødstrup-Løgten
- Solbjerg
- Stavtrup-Ormslev
- Tilst
- Tranbjerg
- Trige-Spørring
- Vejlby-Risskov
- Viby

== Postal districts ==
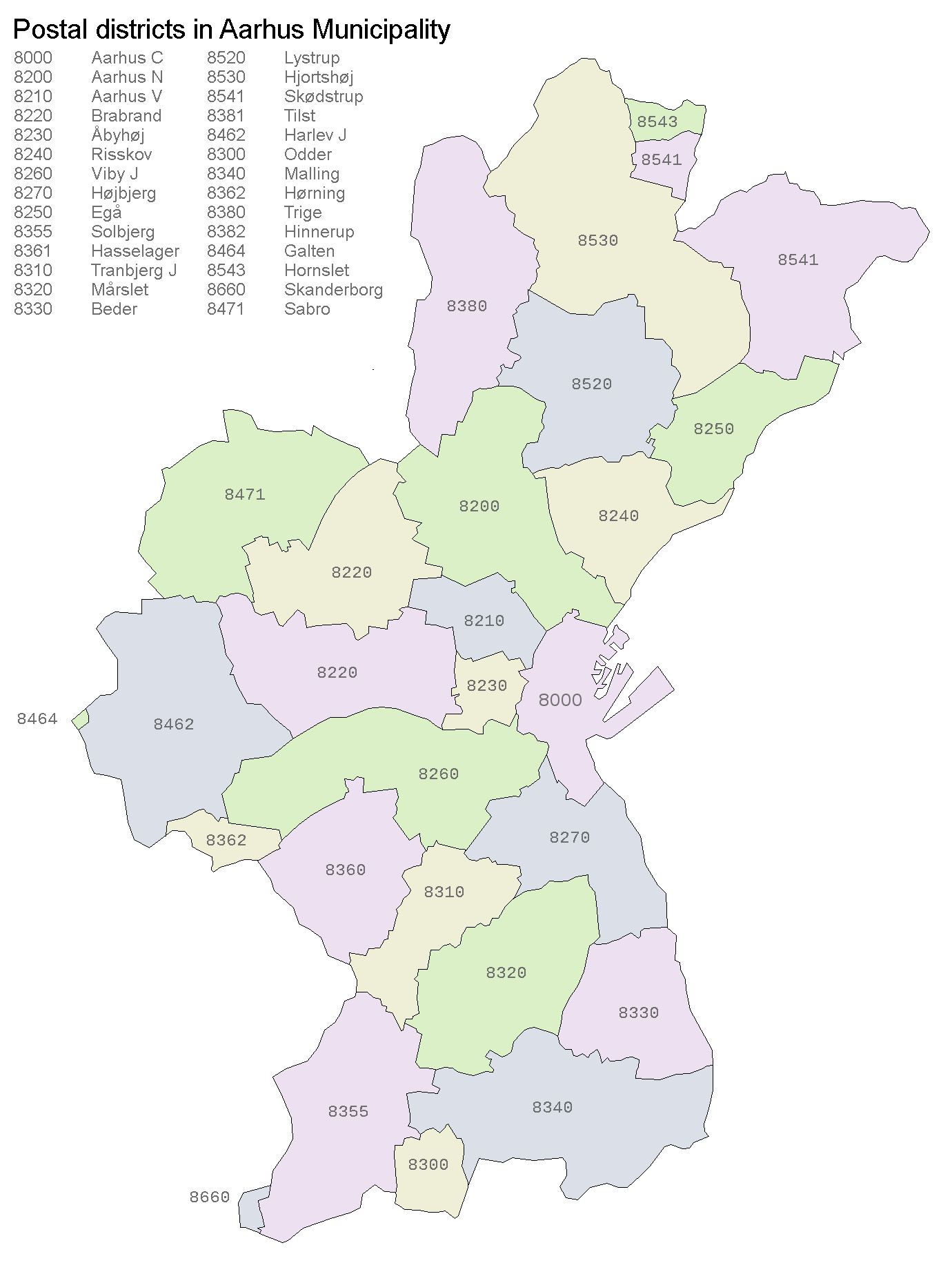
Postal districts in Aarhus Municipality

There are 28 postal districts within Aarhus Municipality although some only partially such as 8660 Skanderborg and *8464 Galten which are almost entirely within Skanderborg Municipality. References to postal districts can sometimes be used in commonplace vernacular as analogous to city districts or neighborhoods in Aarhus.

- 8000 Aarhus C
- 8200 Aarhus N
- 8210 Aarhus V
- 8330 Beder
- 8000 Brabrand
- 8250 Egå
- 8464 Galten
- 8462 Harlev
- 8361 Hasselager
- 8382 Hinnerup
- 8530 Hjortshøj
- 8543 Hornslet
- 8270 Højbjerg
- 8362 Hørning
- 8520 Lystrup
- 8340 Malling
- 8320 Mårslet
- 8300 Odder
- 8240 Risskov
- 8471 Sabro
- 8660 Skanderborg
- 8355 Solbjerg
- 8541 Skødstrup
- 8381 Tilst
- 8310 Tranbjerg
- 8380 Trige
- 8260 Viby
- 8230 Åbyhøj

== Parishes ==
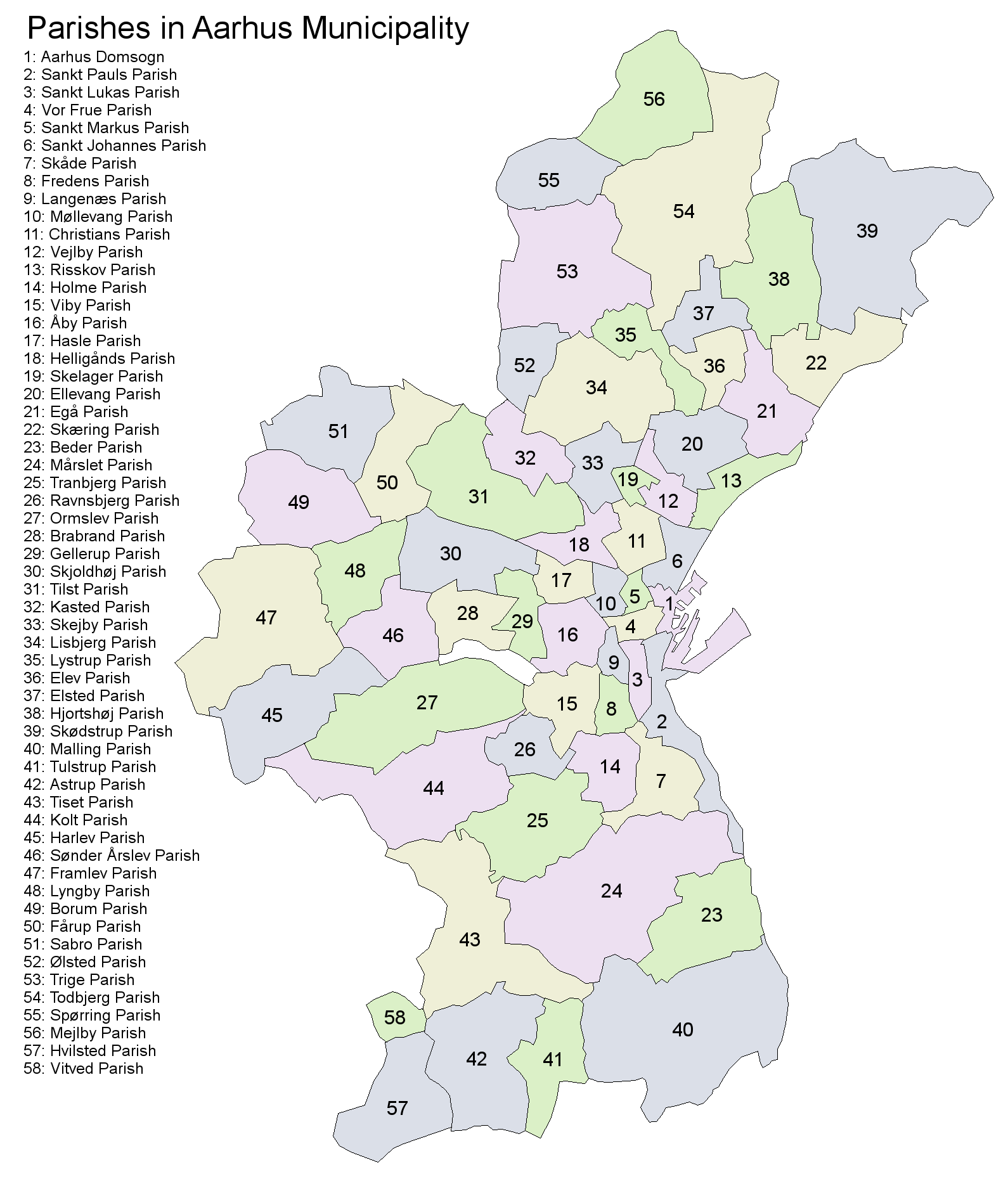
Parishes in Aarhus Municipality

Aarhus Municipality contains 58 parishes split between the 4 deaneries Århus Domprovsti, Århus Nordre Provsti, Århus Søndre Provsti and Arhus Vestre Provsti, all part of the Diocese of Aarhus. Parishes on the municipal borders tend to roughly follow those borders with only a few exceptions such as Vitved Parish which is a part of both Aarhus and Skanderborg Municipality.

- Aarhus Domsogn
- Åby Parish
- Astrup Parish
- Beder Parish
- Borum Parish
- Brabrand Parish
- Christians Parish
- Egå Parish
- Elev Parish
- Ellevang Parish
- Elsted Parish
- Fårup Parish
- Framlev Parish
- Fredens Parish
- Gellerup Parish
- Harlev Parish
- Hasle Parish
- Helligånds Parish
- Hjortshøj Parish
- Holme Parish
- Hvilsted Parish
- Kasted Parish
- Kolt Parish
- Langenæs Parish
- Lisbjerg Parish
- Lyngby Parish
- Lystrup Parish
- Malling Parish
- Mårslet Parish
- Mejlby Parish
- Møllevang Parish
- Ølsted Parish
- Ormslev Parish
- Ravnsbjerg Parish
- Risskov Parish
- Sabro Parish
- Sankt Johannes Parish
- Sankt Lukas Parish
- Sankt Markus Parish
- Sankt Pauls Parish
- Skåde Parish
- Skæring Parish
- Skejby Parish
- Skelager Parish]
- Skjoldhøj Parish
- Skødstrup Parish
- Sønder Årslev Parish
- Spørring Parish
- Tilst Parish
- Tiset Parish
- Todbjerg Parish
- Tranbjerg Parish
- Trige Parish
- Tulstrup Parish
- Vejlby Parish
- Viby Parish
- Vitved Parish
- Vor Frue Parish
