= Aarhus Educational Centre for Agriculture =

Coordinates: 56.058614°N 10.200284°E

Aarhus Educational Center for Agriculture
- Jordbrugets UddannelsesCenter Århus
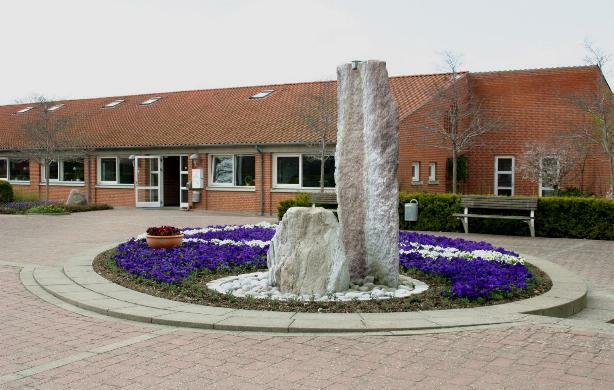
- Aarhus Educational Center for Agriculture
- Type: Agricultural vocational school
- Established: 2008
- President: Jens Ravn2015
- Location: Aarhus, Denmark
- Website: http://www.ju.dk/

Aarhus Educational Centre for Agriculture (Danish: Jordbrugets UddannelsesCenter Århus) is a school of secondary education in Aarhus, Denmark. The school functions as an economically independent institution subordinated to the Ministry of Science, Innovation and Higher Education and offers vocational training in farming, gardening, forestry, zoo keeping, floristry and agricultural management.

The school is spread out over 4 locations in Beder, Malling, Vejlby and Bredballegård. Beder is home to the gardening, floristry and forestry and nature technician programmes. Bredballegård is home to the zoo keeping, farming and agricultural vehicle licensing programmes. Vejlby is home to the agricultural management programme and Malling is home to the horse training and riding programmes.

== History ==
The beginnings of the school can be traced back to 1889 when Beder Horticultural School had its first 4 participants on a gardening course while Malling Agrucultural School opened a few miles to the south. In 1921 Vejlby Agricultural School opened and started buying land tracts in the surrounding areas. In 1959 Beder Horticultural School had grown in size and changed its name to Beder School of Gardening. In 1985 a farm, Bredballegård , with 25 hectares of land in Mårslet is rebuilt as a school for elementary training in the agricultural sciences and for agricultural vehicle licences.

In 1987 Beder School of Gardening took over the elementary training in the agricultural sciences from Aarhus Tech and rents Bredballegård in order to continue in the same facilities. Malling Agrucultural School in 1991 begund a partnership with the Danish Riding Association to educate trainers and riders at Vilhelmsborg. In 1997 the Beder School of Gardening, Malling Agrucultural School and Vejlby Landbrugsskole enters a partnership which leads to a fusion of Beder School of Gardening and Malling Agricultural School in 1999 to the institution Danish Center for Agricultural Education. In 2008 Vejlby Agricultural School and Danish Center for Agricultural Education merged to form the current Aarhus Educational Centre for Agriculture.
