= Stavtrup =

- Neighborhood
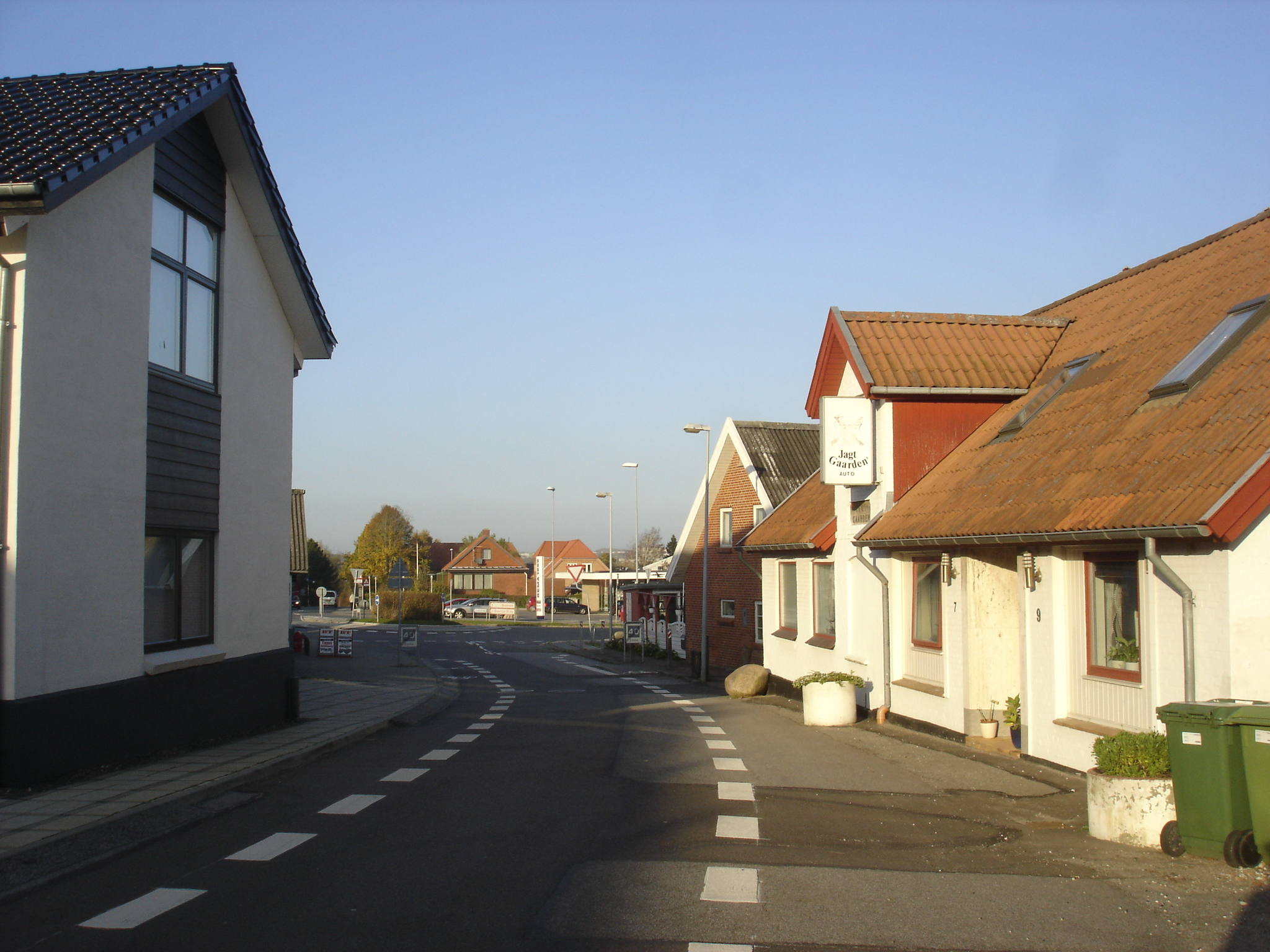

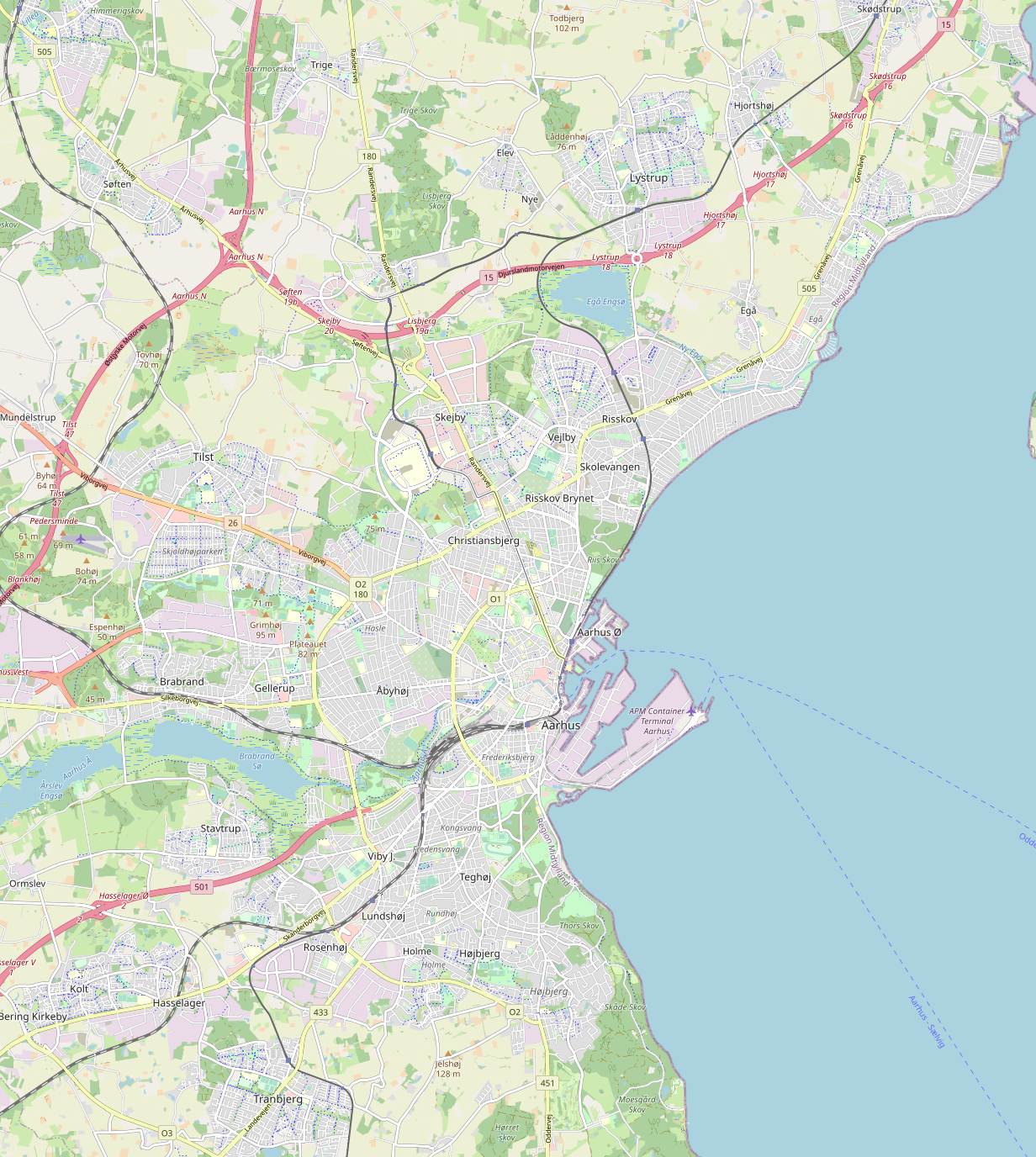
- Location within Aarhus
- Coordinates: 56.130674°N 10.116059°E
- Country: Kingdom of Denmark
- Regions of Denmark: Central Denmark Region
- Municipality: Aarhus Municipality
- District: Viby J
- Postal code: 8260

Stavtrup is a western suburb of Aarhus in Denmark. It is located 7 km from the city centre and had a population of 3,729 (1 January 2010). Since 1 January 2011, Stavtrup is officially a part of Aarhus' urban area under the postal district of Viby J.

Stavtrup is largely a residential area and there is easy access to the nature around Brabrand Lake.
