= Ormslev =

Coordinates: 56.126°N 10.0604°E

- Town
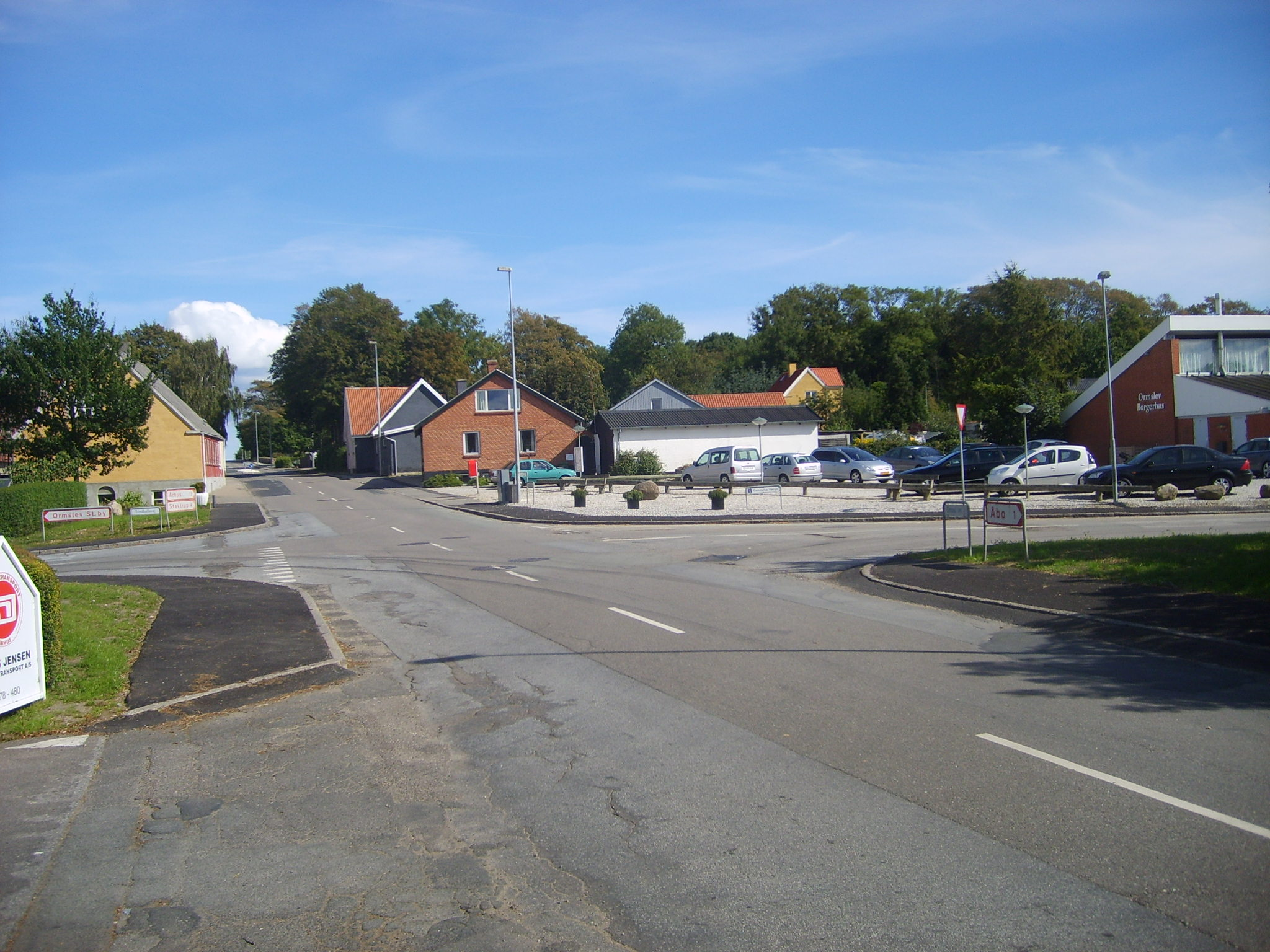
- Ormslev

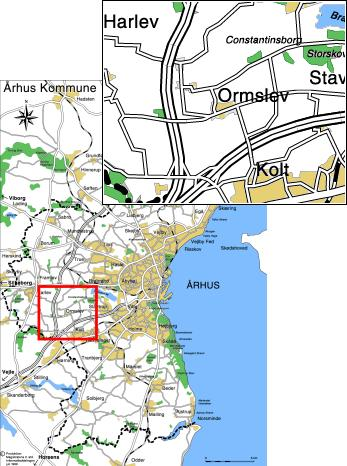
- Aarhus Municipality Ormslev main street
- Country: Kingdom of Denmark
- Regions of Denmark: Central Denmark Region
- Municipality: Aarhus Municipality
- Parish: Ormslev Sogn

Population (2026)
  - Total: 379
- Postal code: 8260 Viby J

Ormslev is a small village in Aarhus Municipality, Central Denmark Region in Denmark with a population of 379 (1 January 2026).

Ormslev is located 11 kilometres (6.8 mi) west of Aarhus city, between the settlements of Stavtrup (4 km (2.5 mi) east), Hasselager (4 km (2.5 mi) southeast) and Harlev (8 km (5.0 mi) west), on the southern slopes of the broad and flat Aarhus Ådal river valley, overlooking the Brabrand Lake and Aarhus River.

The lake and natural site of Årslev Engsø is located 2 kilometres (1.2 mi) northeast of Ormslev, including the historic manor of Constantinsborg. Route E45 passes by immediately west of Ormslev. Further west, about 4 kilometres (2.5 mi), is Aarhus Aadal Golf Club.

== History ==
The church in Ormslev is probably very old, but a large part of it is later additions and the whole church was thoroughly reconstructed in 1739.

The area around Ormslev has been cultivated as farmland a long way back, as part of the historic and influential manor of Constantinsborg. Constantinsborg has been a manor for the nobility from at least the 15th century and is also an important agricultural producer today. From 1902 to 1956 the settlement of Ormslev became a railway town along the now abandoned Hammelbanen rail road line, and the village attracted some industry, including a grain mill, a dairy and some craftsmen. Half a kilometre southwest, marl was mined and transported by rail and the local farmers sent off their vegetables to market. Beginning in the 1930s, however, the small industrious village saw a decline and the rail road line was later abandoned altogether. The former train station, situated about half a kilometre northwest of the village on a lower elevation, has since been preserved and restored.

== Gallery ==
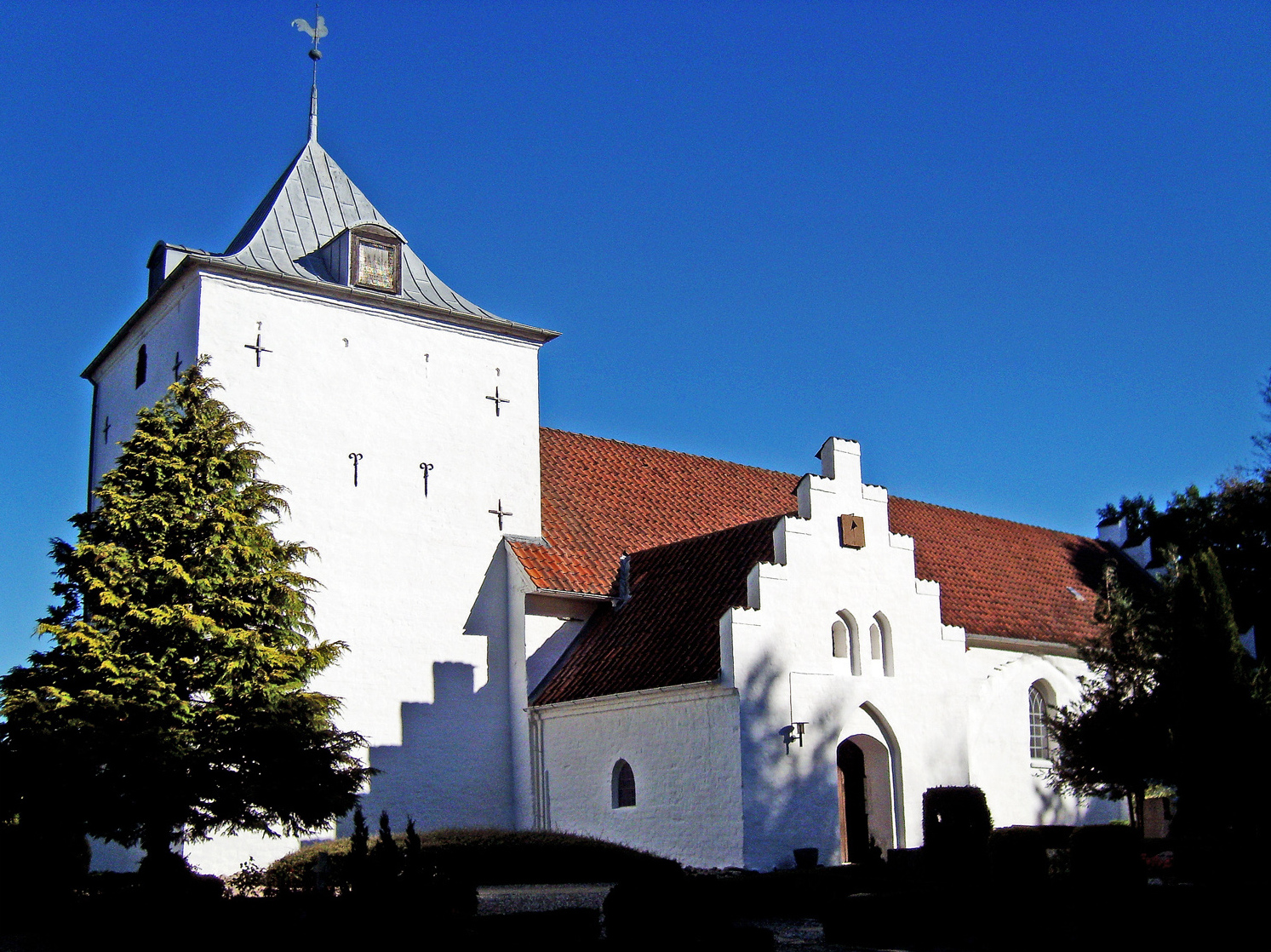
The Romanesque church of Ormslev

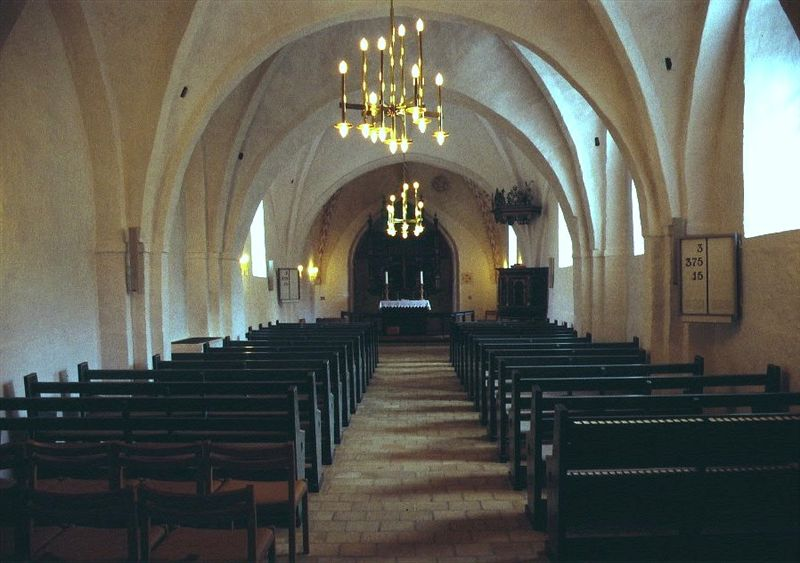
The nave

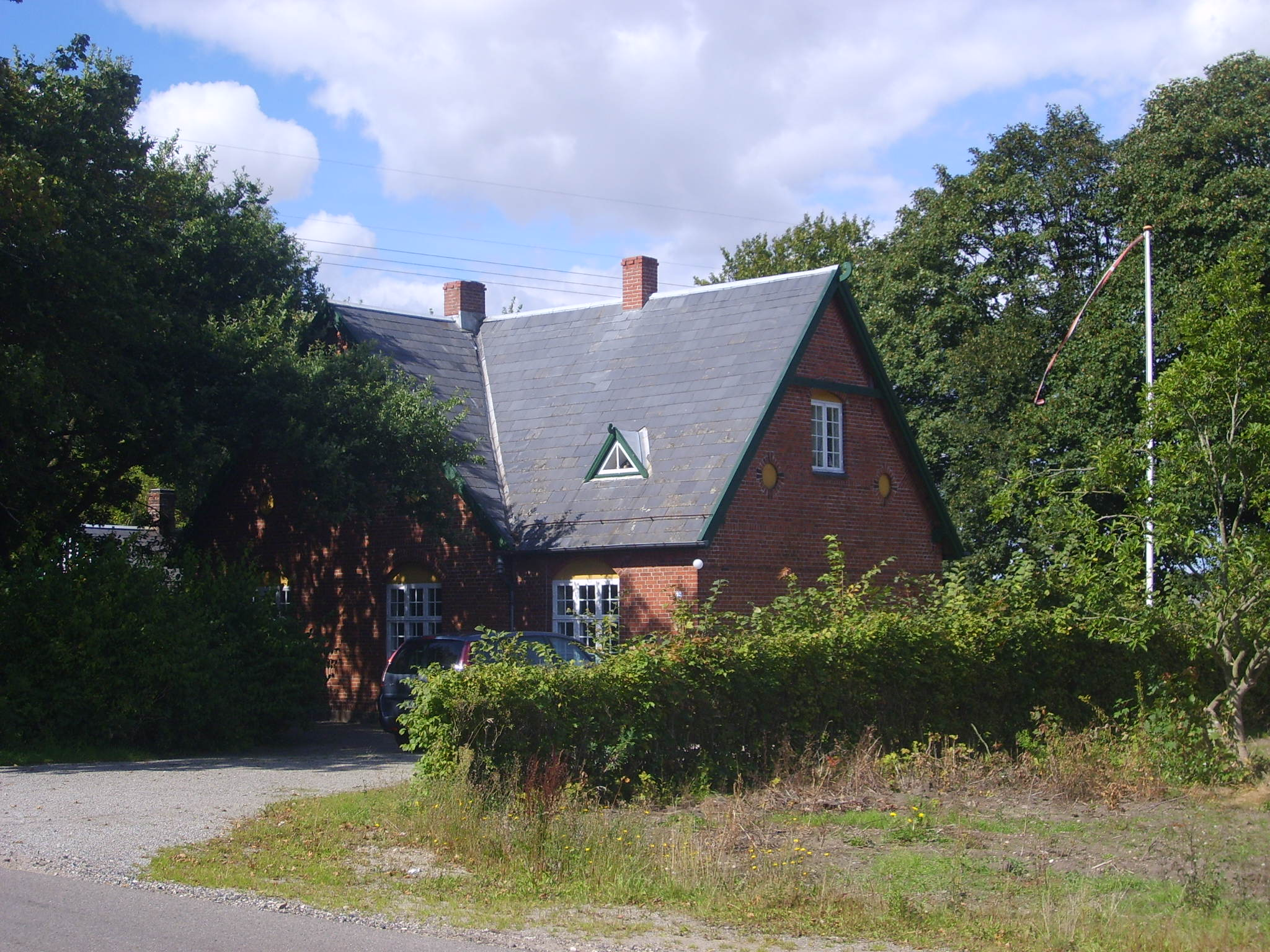
Ormslev train station
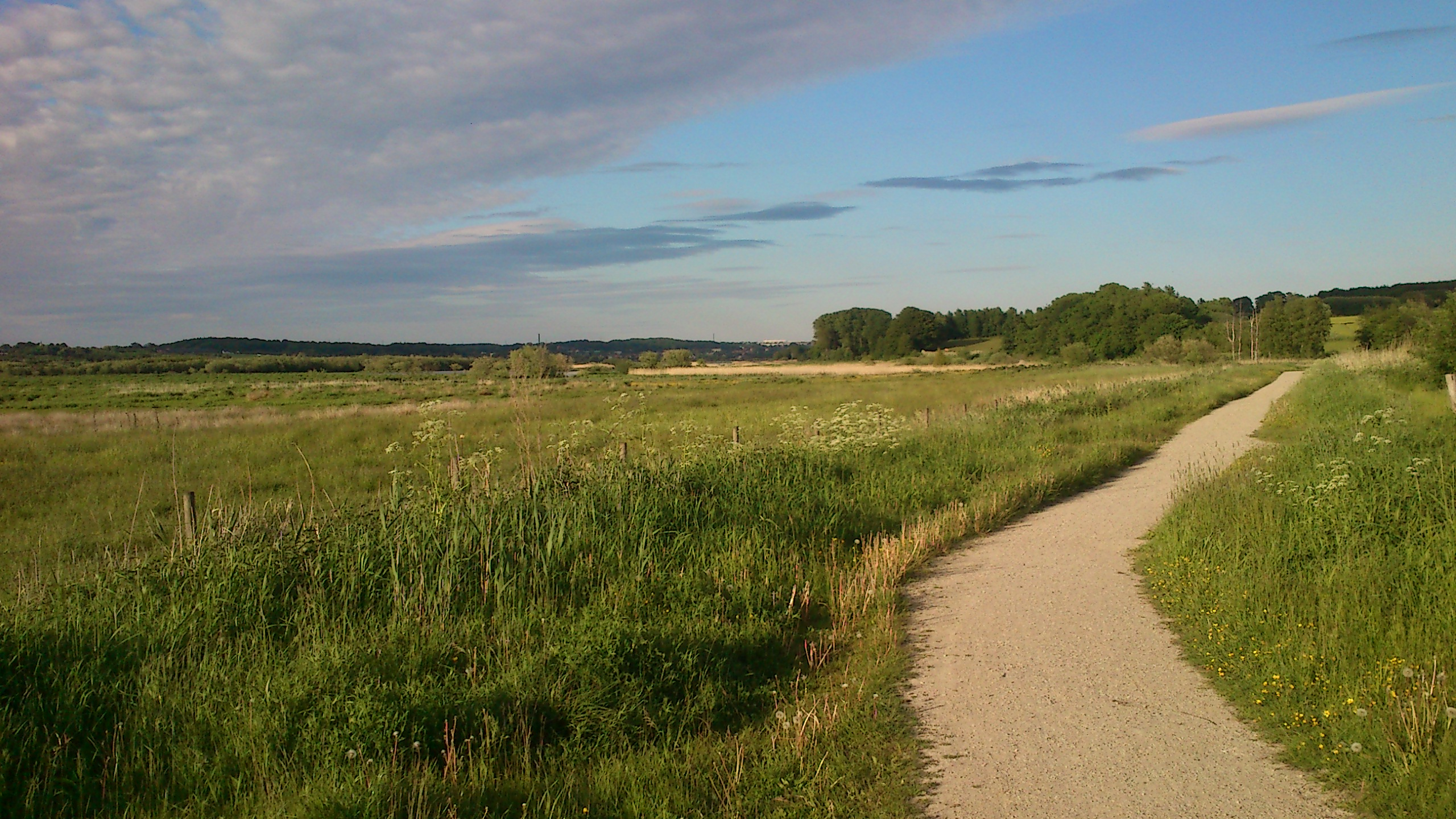
The naturepath around Årslev Engsø lake

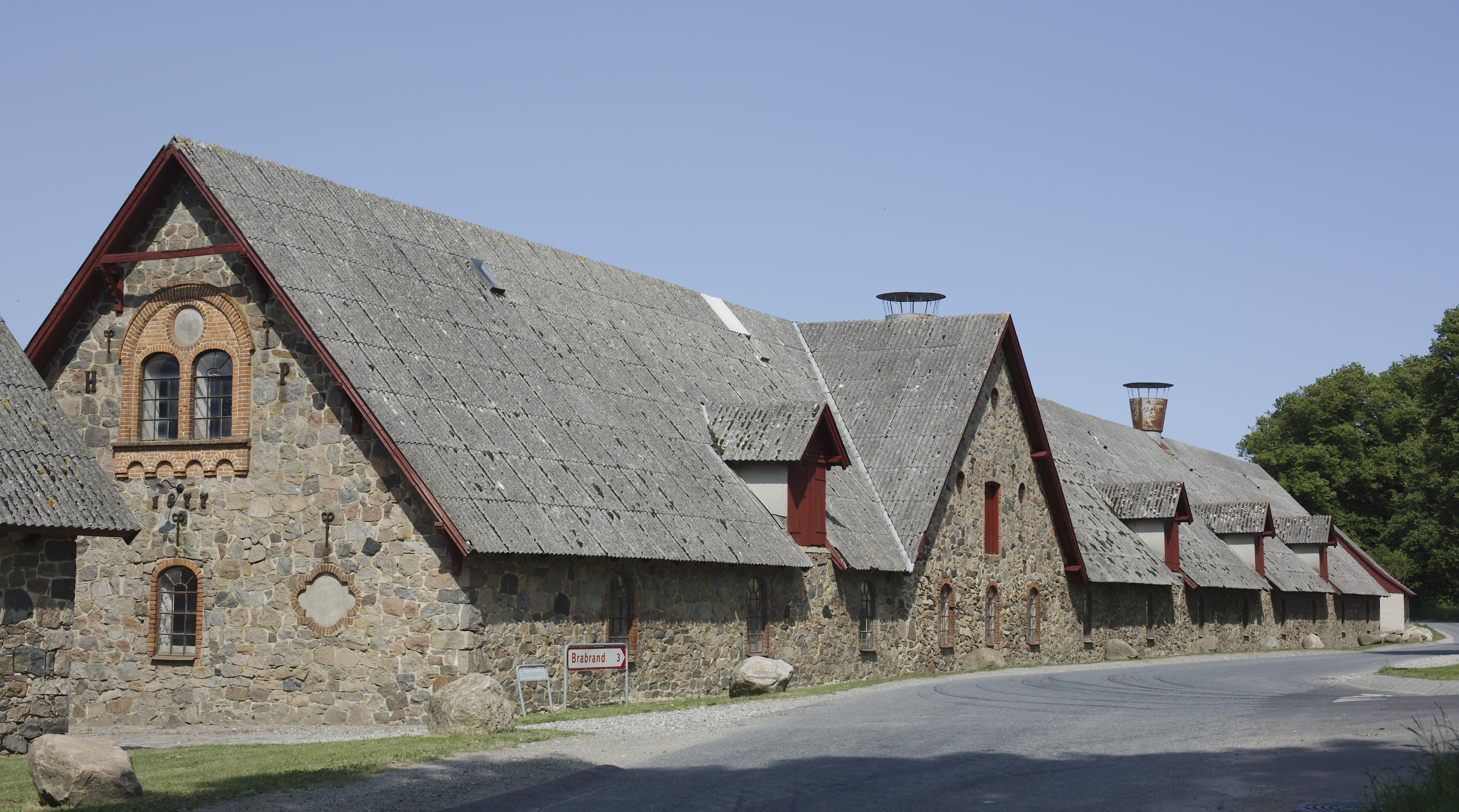
From the manor of Constantinsborg

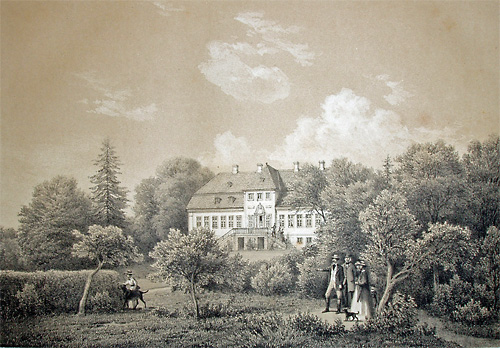
Constantinsborg in 1801

== Sources ==
- Asger Christiansen: Hammelbanen, bane bøger 1996, s. 109 f. og s. 134 (in Danish)
- Aarhus Kommune (2009): Renovation of Ormslev train station
- Danmarks Kirker: Ormslev Kirke Nationalmuseet (in Danish) Summary in English
