= Mejlby =

Coordinates: 56.1805°N 10.1243°E

- Town
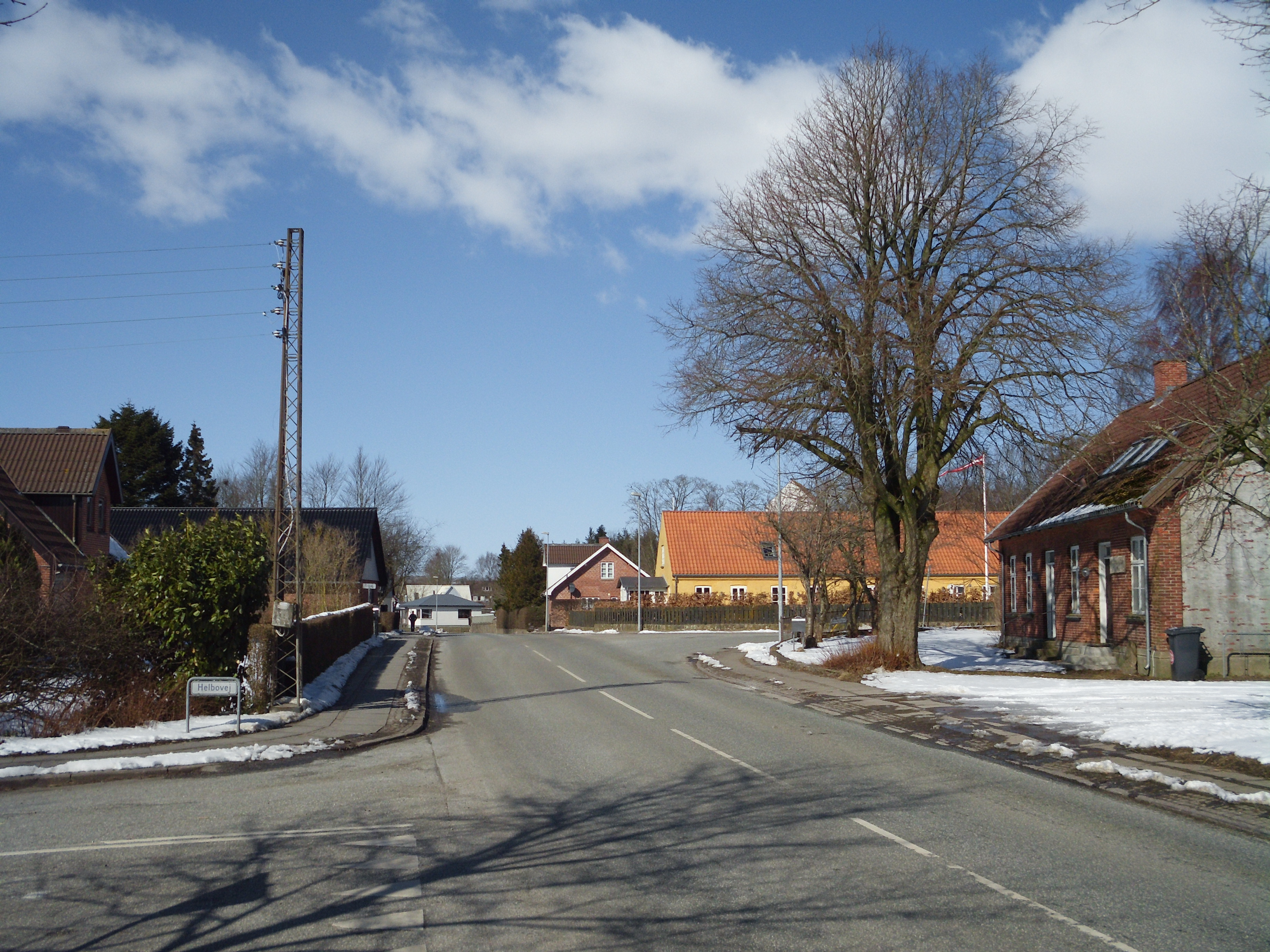
- Mejlby main street

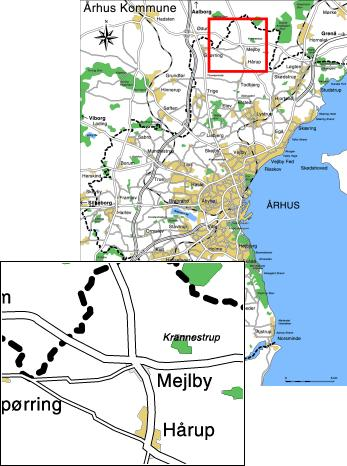
- Location of Mejlby in Aarhus Municipality
- Country: Kingdom of Denmark
- Regions of Denmark: Central Denmark Region
- Municipality: Aarhus Municipality
- Parish: Mejlby Sogn

Population (2026)
  - Total: 386
- Postal code: 8530 Hjortshøj

Mejlby is a town in Aarhus Municipality, Central Denmark Region in Denmark with a population of 386 (1 January 2026). Mejlby is situated the northern section of Aarhus Municipality, 20 kilometers from the city of Aarhus. The closest towns are Hårup, one kilometer to the south, Lystrup five kilometers to the south and Spørring three kilometers to the west. E45 passes by six kilometers to the west of the town.
