= Beder, Denmark =

Town in Denmark

Coordinates: 56°04′N 10°13′E

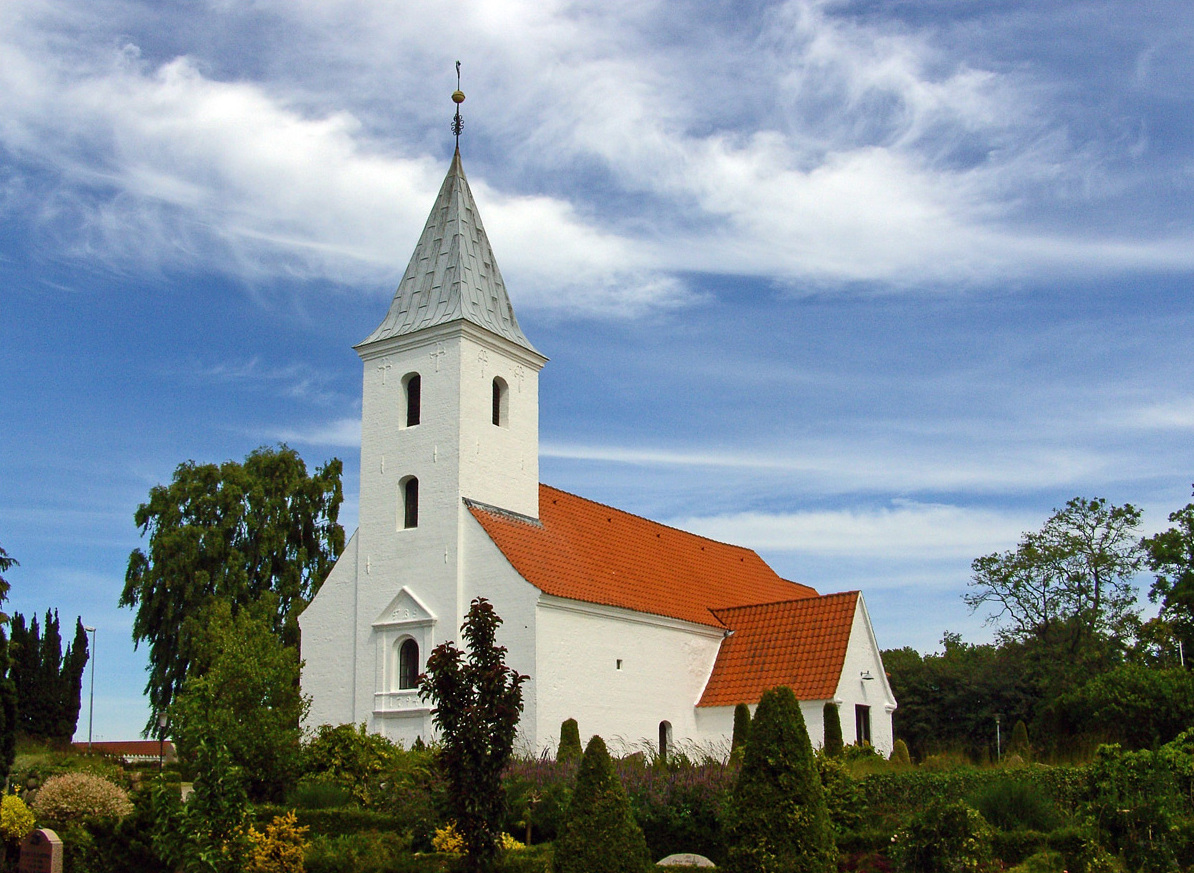
Chapel in Beder, Aarhus

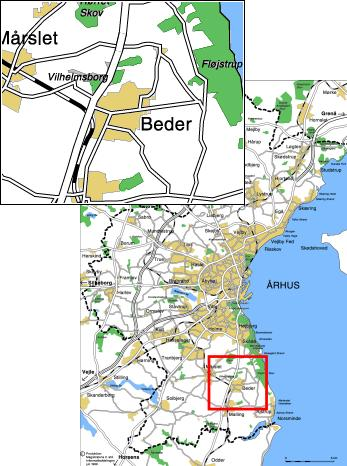
Location of Beder, near Aarhus.

Beder is a town with a population of 4,372 (9 January 2012) in Jutland in Denmark. Some consider Beder & the neighbouring town of Malling as one urban area. DST has since 2012 considered Beder and Malling as one urban area making it the 84th largest in Denmark with a total population of 9,430 in 2025.

The town shares a sporting complex with neighbouring town Malling called Egelund, where the team BMI (Beder Malling Idrætsforening) plays their football, handball, basketball, etc., matches.

Beder-Malling is located in the southernmost part of Århus Municipality bordering the Kattegat. The area is divided into 2 parishes (postal codes 8330 and 8340) and comprises 7x7 square kilometres with approximately 9000 inhabitants. Both Beder and Malling supports a small train station and in the vicinity of the 2 main towns there are 9 smaller villages. Beder is the 3rd most densely populated area within the municipality (1. Aarhus, 2. Lystrup, 3. Beder).

Beder is home to a division of Aarhus Educational Centre for Agriculture, offering gardening, floristry, forestry and nature technician programmes.

== Notable people ==
- Louise Nørlund (1854–1919), a Danish feminist and pacifist was born in Beder.

Preceding station	Aarhus Letbane	Following station
Malling towards Odder	Line 2	Vilhelmsborg towards Lisbjergskolen or Lystrup
