= Brabrand Lake =

Lake in Braband, Denmark

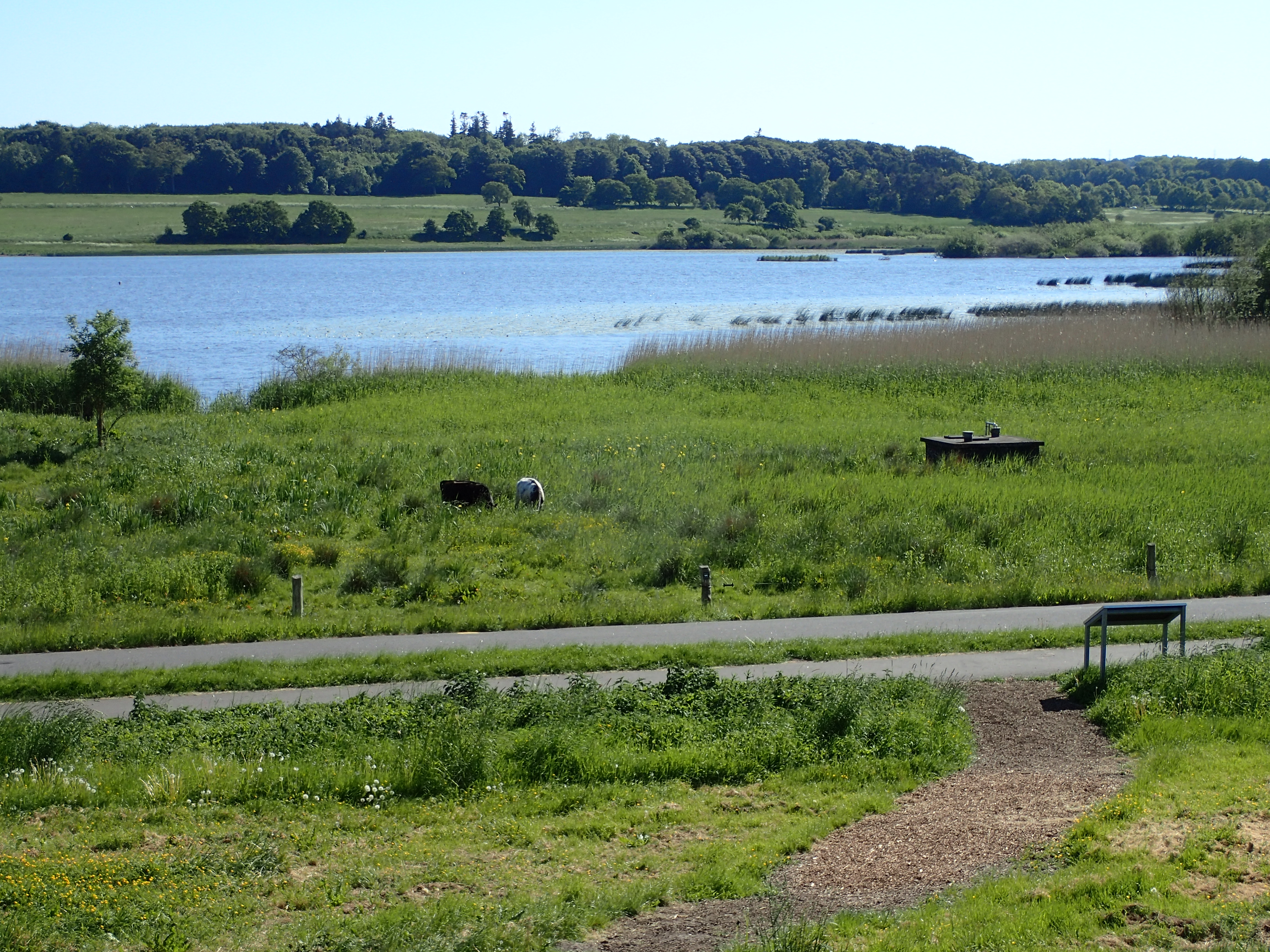
- Brabrand Lake in May

- Location within Denmark
- Location: Midtjylland
- Coordinates: 56.145°N 10.120°E
- Type: tunnel valley
- Primary inflows: Aarhus River, Døde Å, Voldbækken, Lyngbygård Å, Madsesbæk, Kildebæk.
- Primary outflows: Aarhus River
- Catchment area: 282 km^{2} (109 sq mi)
- Surface area: 2.53 km^{2} (0.98 sq mi); Brabrand Lake: 1.53 km^{2} (0.59 sq mi); Årselv Engsø: 1.00 km^{2} (0.39 sq mi)
- Average depth: Brabrand Lake: 1.1 m (3.6 ft); Årslev Engsø: 0.5 m (1.6 ft)
- Max. depth: Brabrand Lake: 2.7 m (8.9 ft); Årslev Engsø: 2 m (6.6 ft)
- Shore length^{1}: 16.5 km (10.3 mi); Brabrand Lake: 8 km (5.0 mi); Årselv Engsø: 8.5 km (5.3 mi)
- Surface elevation: 0.63 m (2.1 ft)
- Settlements: Aarhus
- ^{1} Shore length is not a well-defined measure.

Brabrand Lake (Danish: Brabrand-søen or Brabrand Sø) is a lake in the district of Brabrand (Gellerup), west of Aarhus city, Denmark. The Aarhus River passes through Brabrand Lake and it is possible to canoe all the way to the inner city from here. The lake is oblong-shaped.

Since 2003, Brabrand Lake has been steadily extended 3–4 km further west, with the new lake of Årslev Engsø (lit.: Årslev meadow-lake). In 2001–2, it was politically decided to abandon the artificial draining of the meadows and as of 2013, Årslev meadow lake has a surface area of around 100 hectares (250 acres). The total area including adjoining meadows and reed beds totals 240 hectares (590 acres). It is hoped that Eurasian bittern and otter will find themselves a new home here with time. In everyday parlance, "Brabrand Lake" is a general term including the surroundings as well, indicating a total area of around 560 hectares (1,400 acres) with 253 hectares (630 acres) for the lake alone.

A special Natura2000 protected area under the European Union, Brabrand Lake is home to a large variety of birds and an important resting place for migrating birds, with several towers built to facilitate bird-watching. A public hiking trail surrounds the lake, whose landscape varies from wide meadows and reed beds to dense woods. Privately owned pastures almost completely surround the lake and are not publicly accessible, but public paths leading to the lake are scattered in between. There are several garden allotments ("kolonihaver" in Danish) near Brabrand Lake and it is a popular recreational spot. It is a statutory goal of the Aarhus municipality to make the area publicly accessible and attractive to the public.

== Activities and sports ==
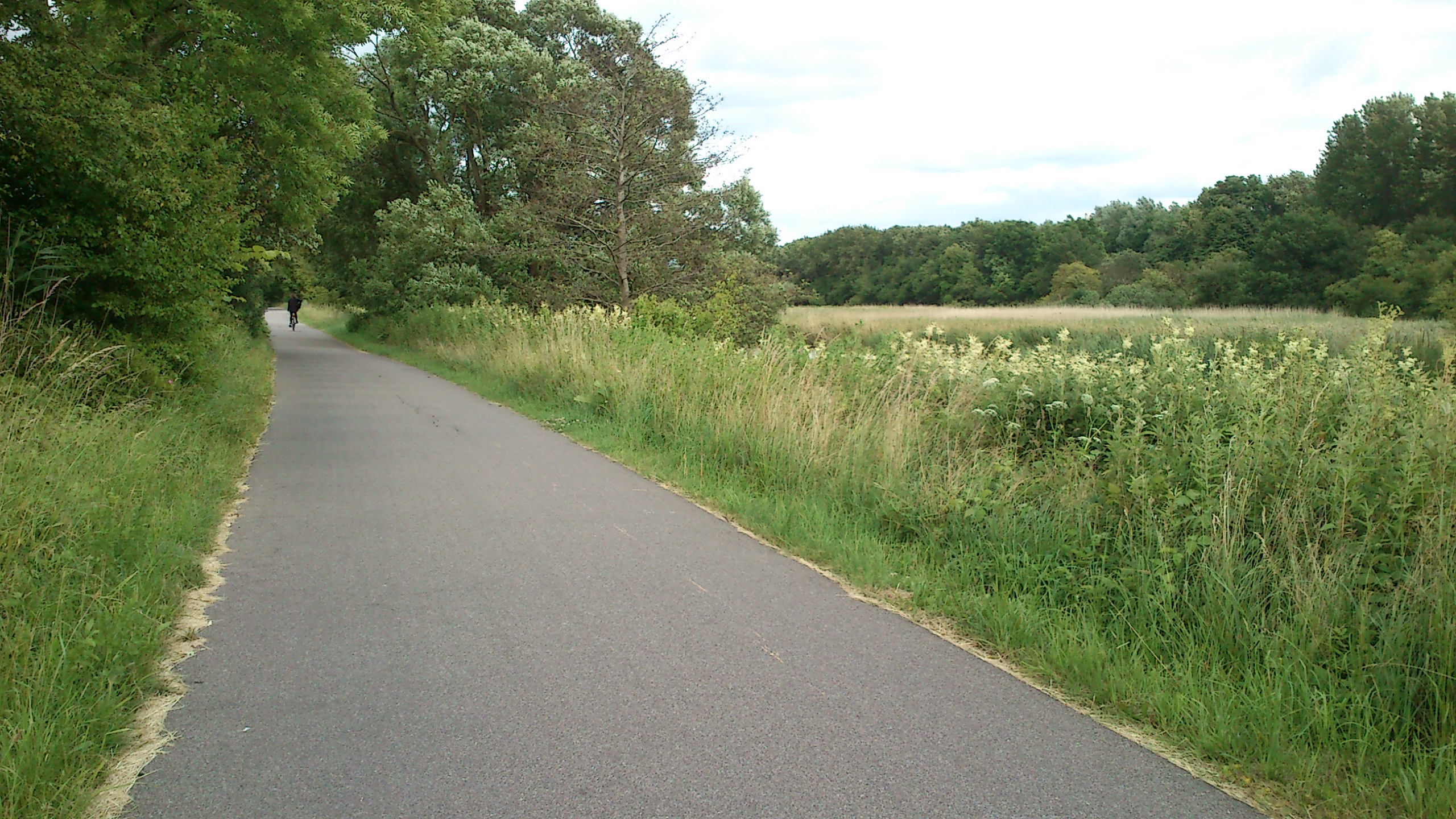
Brabrandstien (1956) is a pathway running from the inner city of Aarhus and encircling both Brabrand Sø and Årslev Engsø. It is c. 26 km long.

Brabrandstien (lit.: the Brabrand pathway), which runs along the Aarhus river from the inner city and around both Brabrand Sø and Årslev Engsø, was established by the City Council in 1956 as a labor project for the unemployed, to give the public better access to green space. The pathway is c. 26 km long, with 9.5 km for Brabrand Lake alone. With the addition of Årslev Engsø, the pathway grew another 8 km. A large part of Brabrandstien is asphalted and is popular for cycling, rollerskating and jogging. Some of the graveled western parts are used for horseback riding. Cars are not allowed and motor vehicles are restricted. Brabrandstien is part of the Aarhus-Silkeborg hiking trail.

On the northern bank of Brabrand Lake lies the facilities of Brabrand Rostadion (Brabrand Rowing Stadium). The stadium was established in 1952 and was heavily renovated and rebuilt in the year 2010. C. F. Møller Architects was the architectural firm behind the new buildings. Local rowing and kayaking clubs have used the lake for practice and larger regattas for many years. Rocenter Aarhus RCA (Aarhus Rowing Center) is located here, offering qualified training for rowers and clubs in East and South Jutland on all levels (including elite) and for all ages. There is a 2,000 m racing track on Brabrand Lake and it is generally perceived as very good for outrigger racing, but other types of boats are also rowed here, including kayaks. Aarhus Roklub (Aarhus Rowing Club), based here, have scored several prestigious medals. In 2005, Maria Pertl won silver in the World Rowing Championships in collaboration with Juliane Elander Rasmussen. In 2011, Andrej Lawaetz Bendtsen won gold at the WRC for seniors in a team of four.

== Environmental projects ==
The lake is not very deep and has suffered from eutrophication for many years. The excessive nutrients originate from waste water and agricultural activities and pose a constant environmental threat to the surrounding ecology and the Bay of Aarhus. Eutrophication is a common problem all over the developed world. Starting in 1959 with 158 hectares, several environmental projects have aimed to alleviate the environmental burdens and at the same time maintain the aesthetic value of the lake and surrounding areas. These projects includes mud pumping of the lakebed and willow afforestations. Also, the local water company Aarhus Vand A/S began extracting phosphor from wastewater in 2013 at a water treatment plant in Åby close to the lake. Phosphor is a key element in the eutrophication process but a valuable resource on its own and the water treatment plant is among only a few in the world to engage with this. It is hoped that the rich fen ecology which formerly characterized the lake, and is a threatened nature-type in general, can be restored in the future.

The groundwater beneath and adjoining Brabrand Lake is very important, as it provides drinking water to more than 100,000 people in the greater Aarhus area. Acting partly on this fact, the lake water was also included in a large water treatment project led by Aarhus Vand A/S from 2006 to 2013. The project involved the Brabrand Lake, the Aarhus River and the Aarhus harbour, budgeted at € 45 million. As a result, the waters in Brabrand Lake and the Aarhus River attained bathing quality in September 2012.

== Special flora and fauna ==
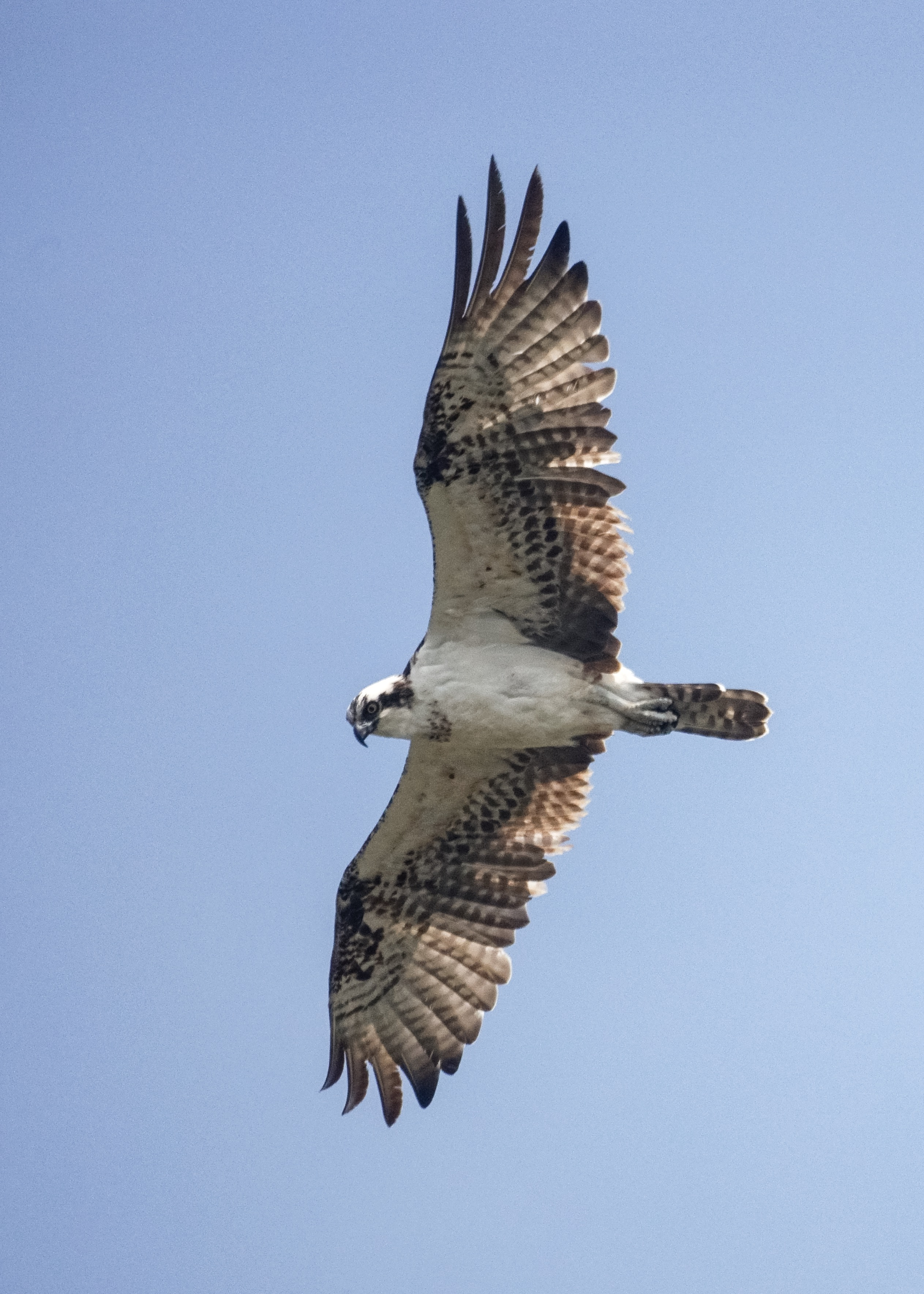
Ospreys, and other birds of prey, are occasionally foraging, wintering or breeding around Brabrand Lake. The lake area attracts, and is home to, many species of birds that are rare or endangered in Denmark.

Many species of flora and fauna at Brabrand Lake are either rare or relatively rare in Denmark and on the Danish Red List (under IUCN Red List). Some also are protected under different habitat directives of the EU. Here are a few examples:

- Several Lathyrus species grow here, such as the tuberous pea, which is rare in Denmark, and the relatively rare marsh pea.
- Several relatively rare rush species grow here, such as European hard rush, heath rush and slender rush.
- Several orchids of the Dactylorhiza species are found growing here. Worthy of special mention is the common western marsh orchid and the relatively rare early marsh orchid, both of which are protected and mentioned in the Danish Nature Protection Law ( §3) and the Washington Convention (list II.B). Although the w.m. orchid is one of the most common orchids in Denmark, it is also included due to alarming population decline.
- The white storks occasionally resting here are critically endangered (CR) and relatively rare in Denmark.
- The common nightingale living here is rare in Denmark. The thrush nightingale, common in Denmark, is also found at the lake.
- Årslev Engsø regularly attracts rare birds such as osprey (CR), white-tailed eagle (vulnerable VU), peregrine falcon (extinct as breeders RE), little gull (RE), mediterranean gull, black tern (endangered EN), caspian tern, spotted crake (near threatened NT), broad-billed sandpiper, red-necked phalarope and water pipit.
- The green hawker dragonflies are near threatened (NT) and rare in Denmark. They have been protected here under the EU habitat directive (IV) since 1992.
- The population of pond bats living at Brabrand Lake is protected under the Natura 2000 Plan 233. Pond bats are endangered (EN) in western Europe, but maybe only near threatened on a global scale.

Apart from these rarer species, the Brabrand Lake area is characterized by many common species living here, mostly birds, insects and aquatic plants.

== Archaeological finds ==
The area around Brabrand Lake has been populated for at least 6,000 years. In prehistoric times, Brabrand Lake was part of a deep brackish water fjord, offering natural protection and food in abundance. There were archaeological excavations here as early as 1903, revealing early Stone Age settlements and activities from the Ertebølle Culture. The Brabrand Lake area is still an active archaeological site today and has revealed Bronze Age settlements and Viking activities such as a large shipbuilding yard.

== Gallery ==
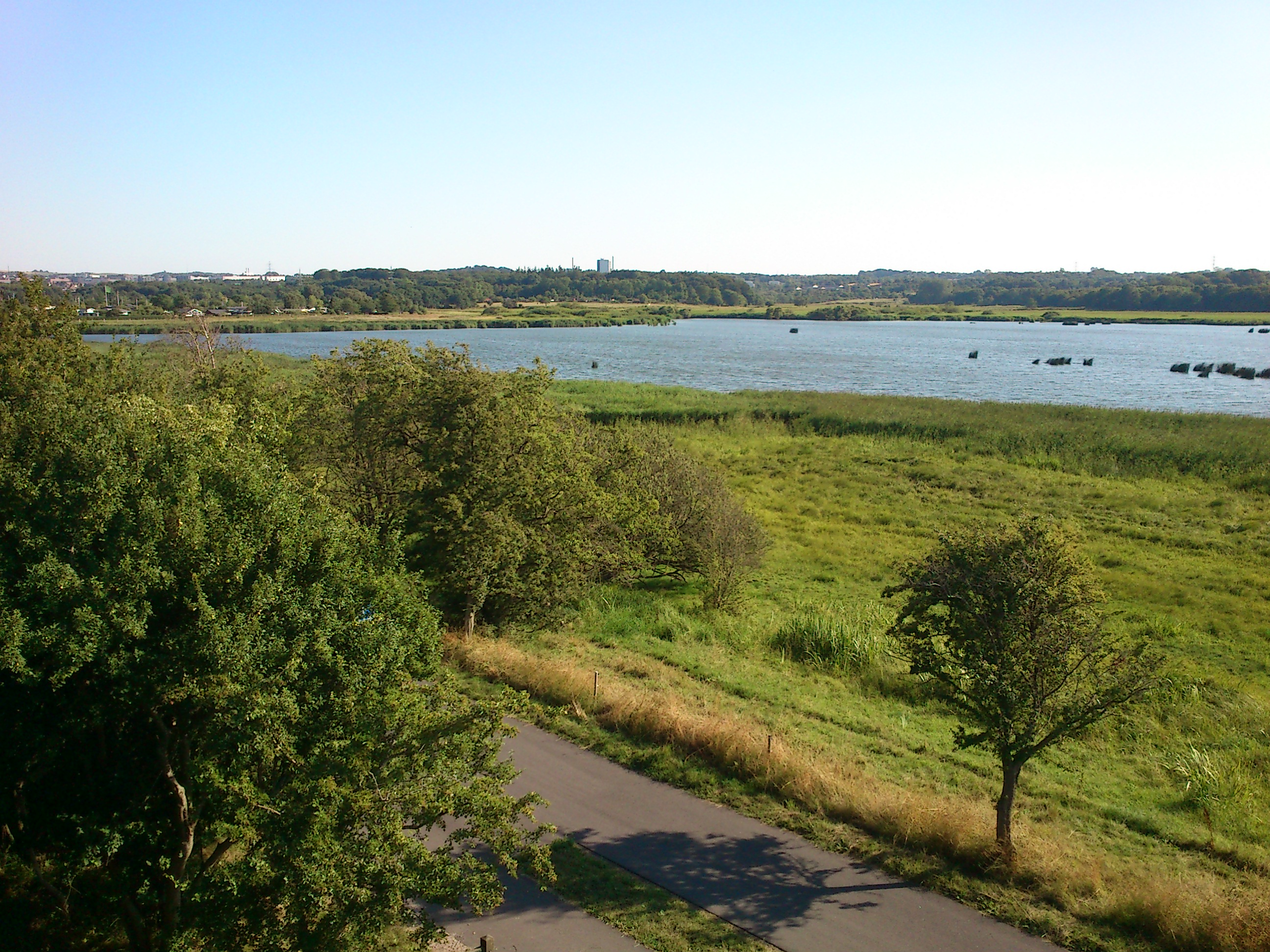
Eastward view from a birdwatching tower.

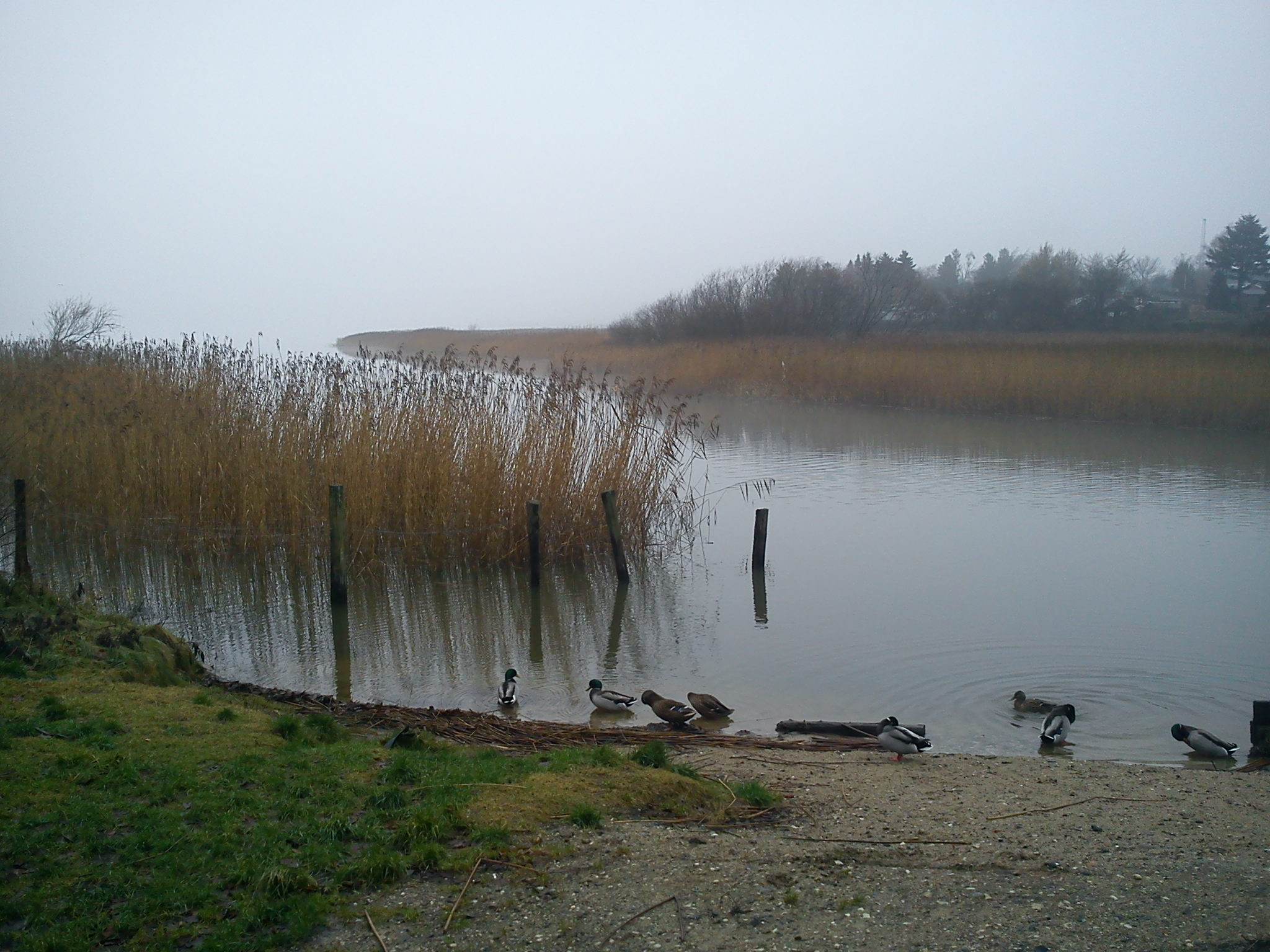
Brabrand Lake on a grey foggy day in December.

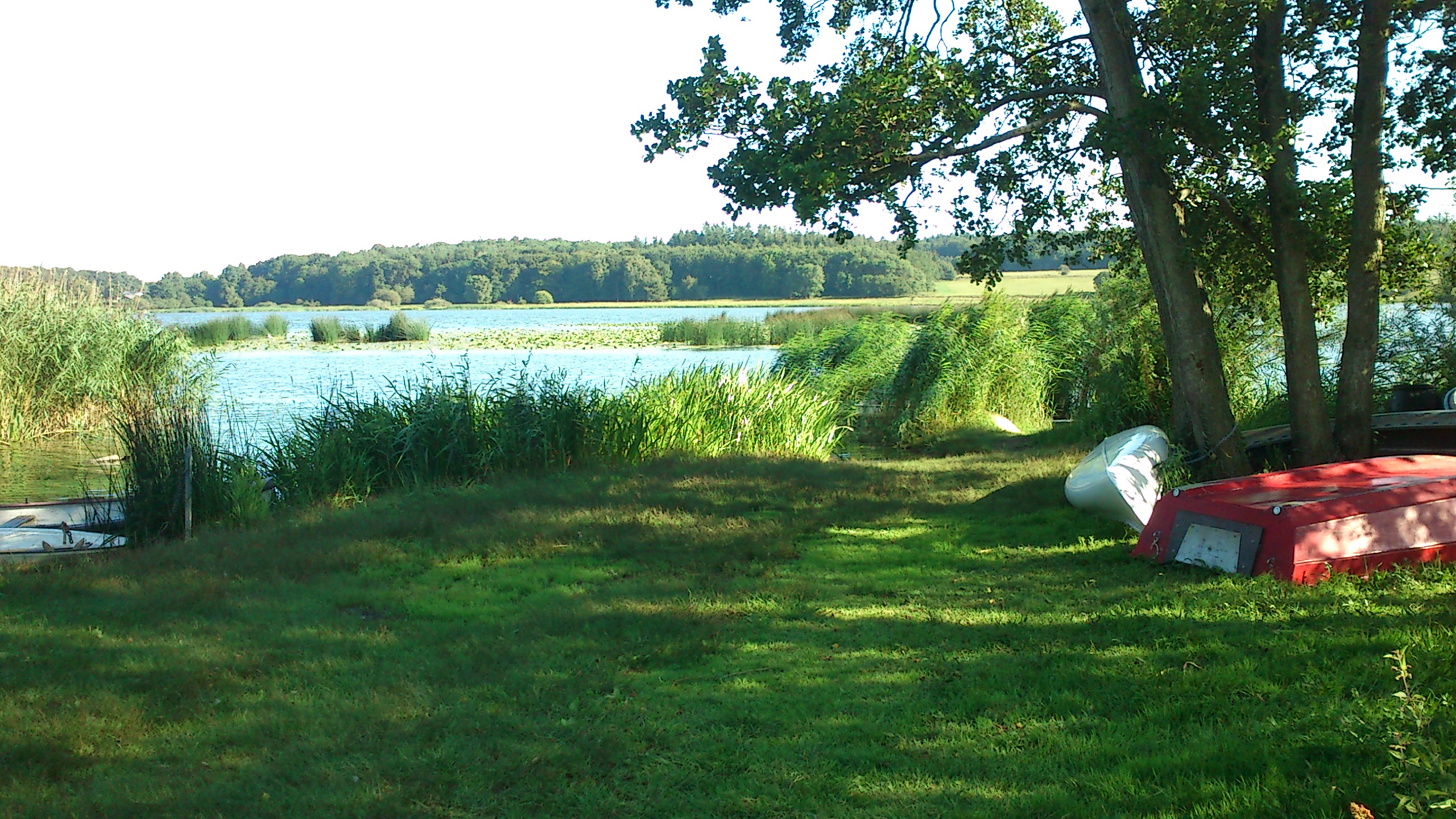
A berth.

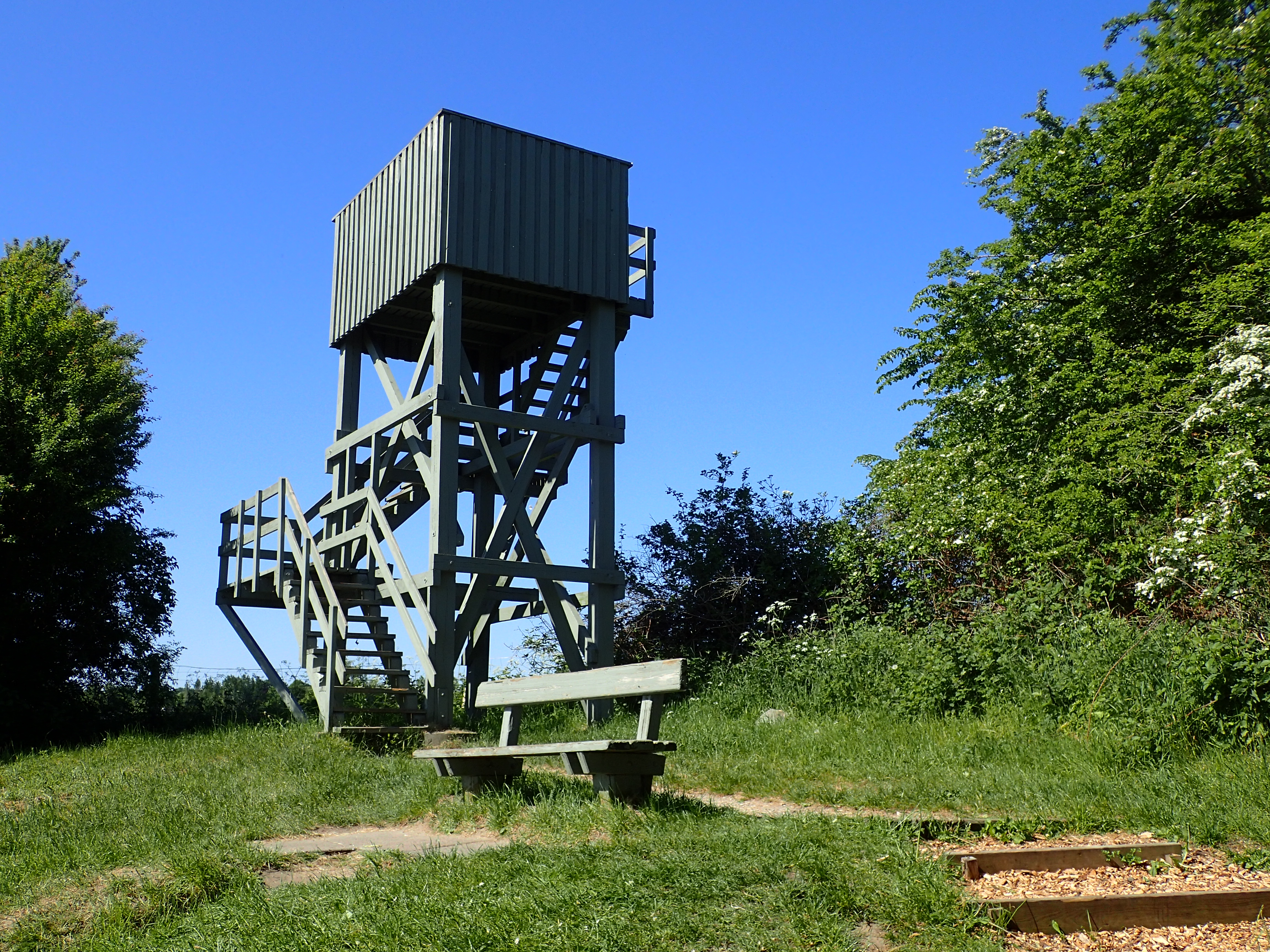
Birdwatching tower

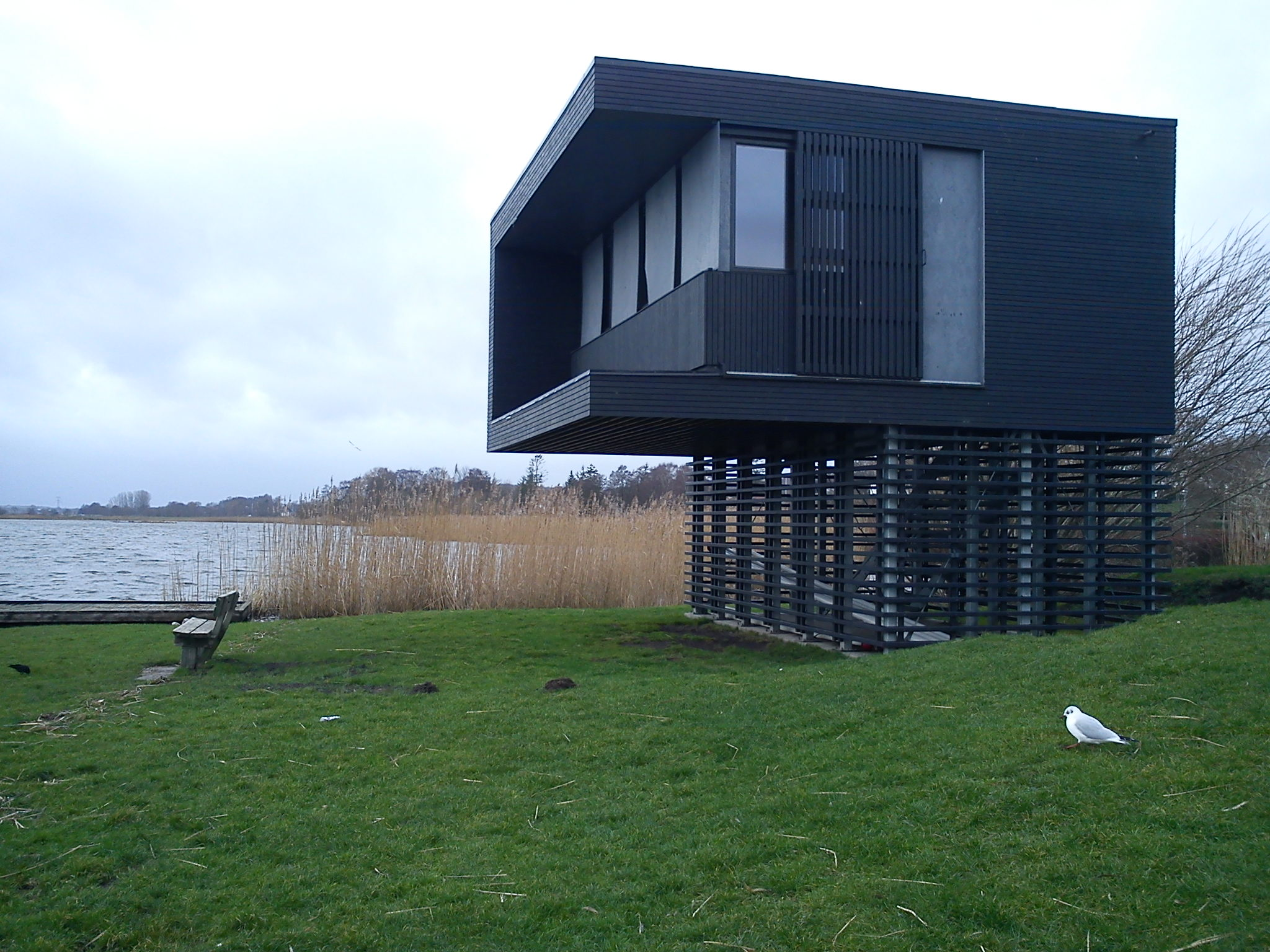
The observation tower at the rowing stadium.

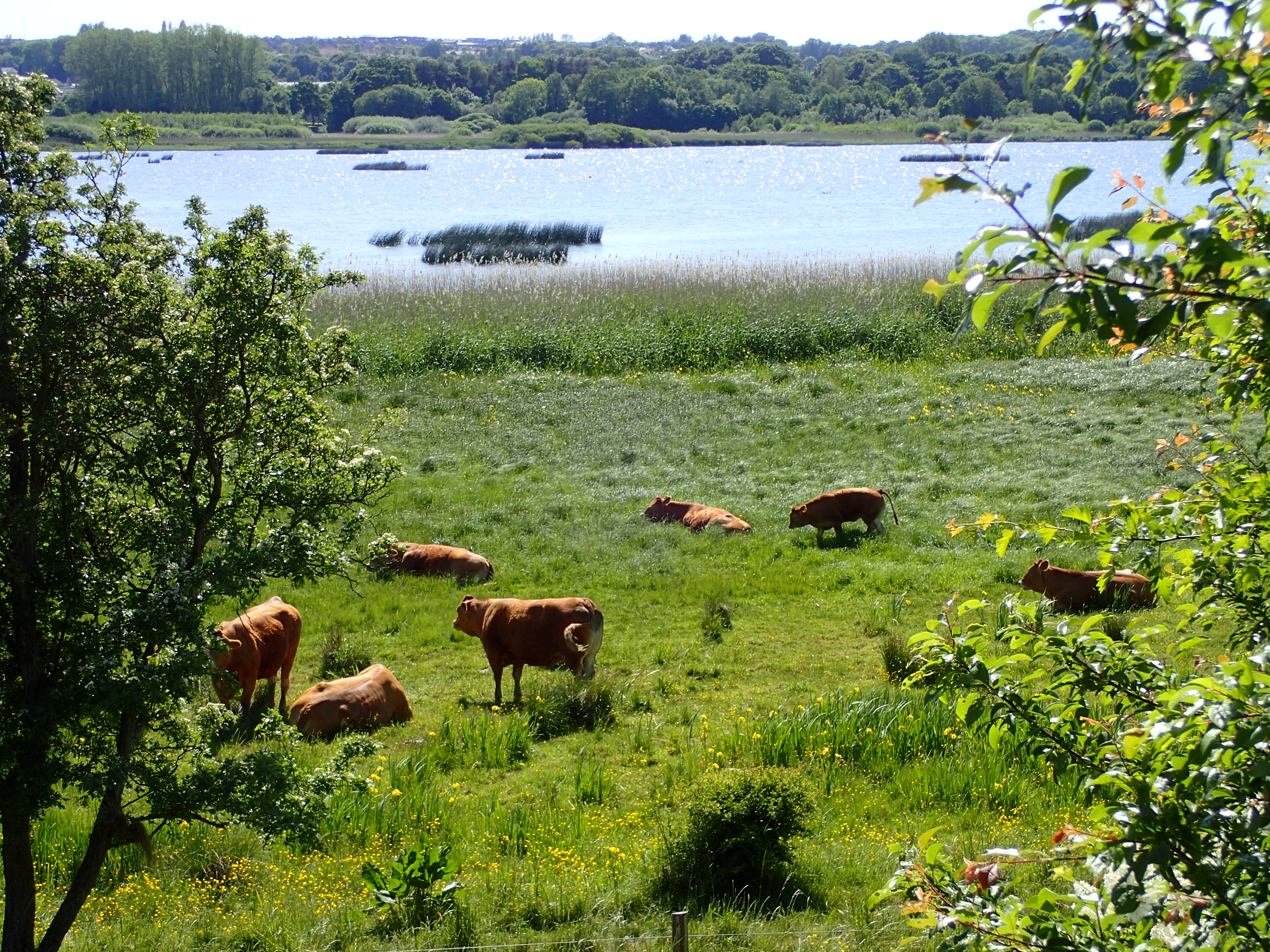
Pasture meadows with grazing cattle.

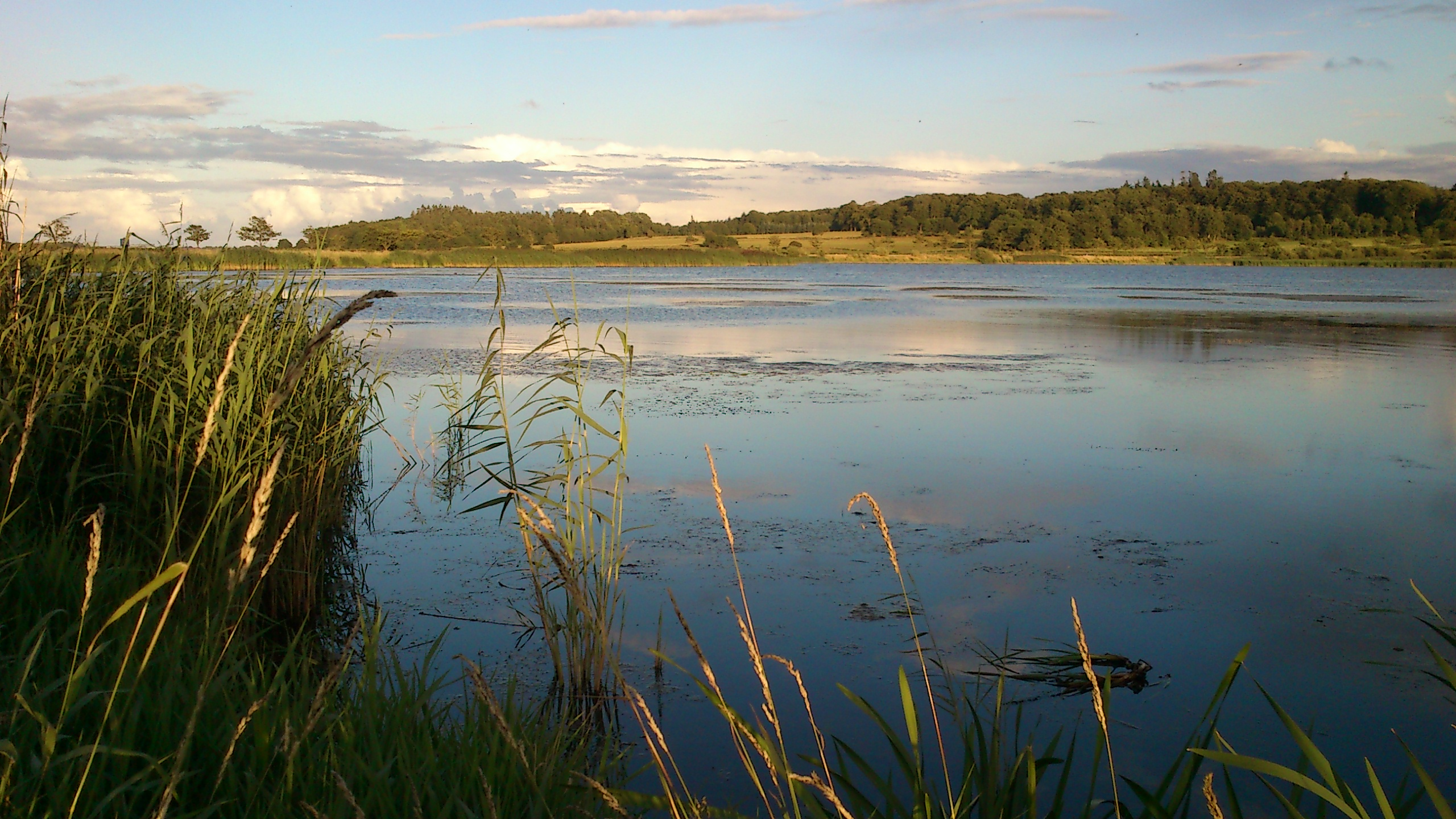
View across the newly formed Årslev Engsø on a summer's eve.

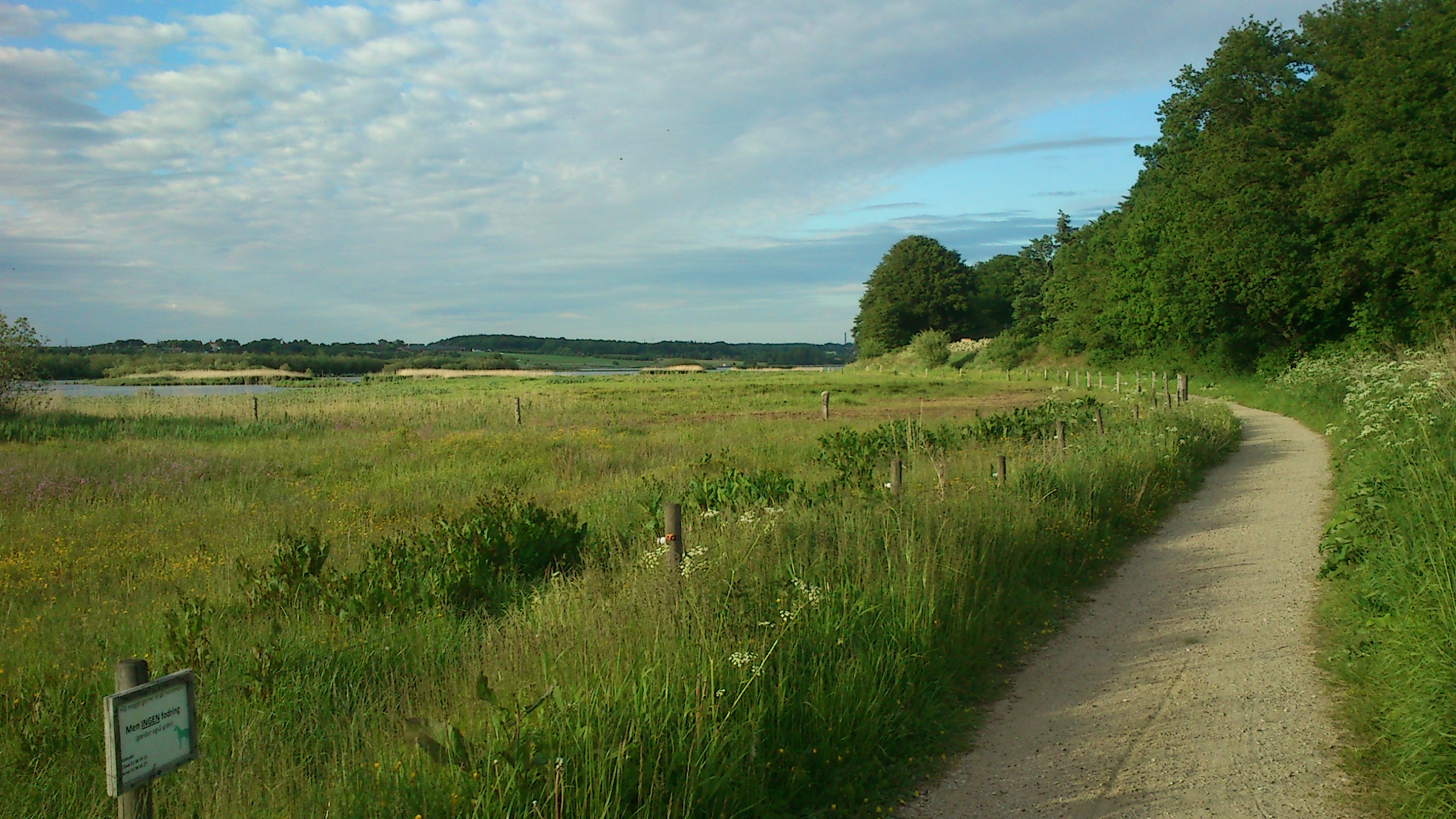
The graveled hiking trail south of Årslev Engsø.

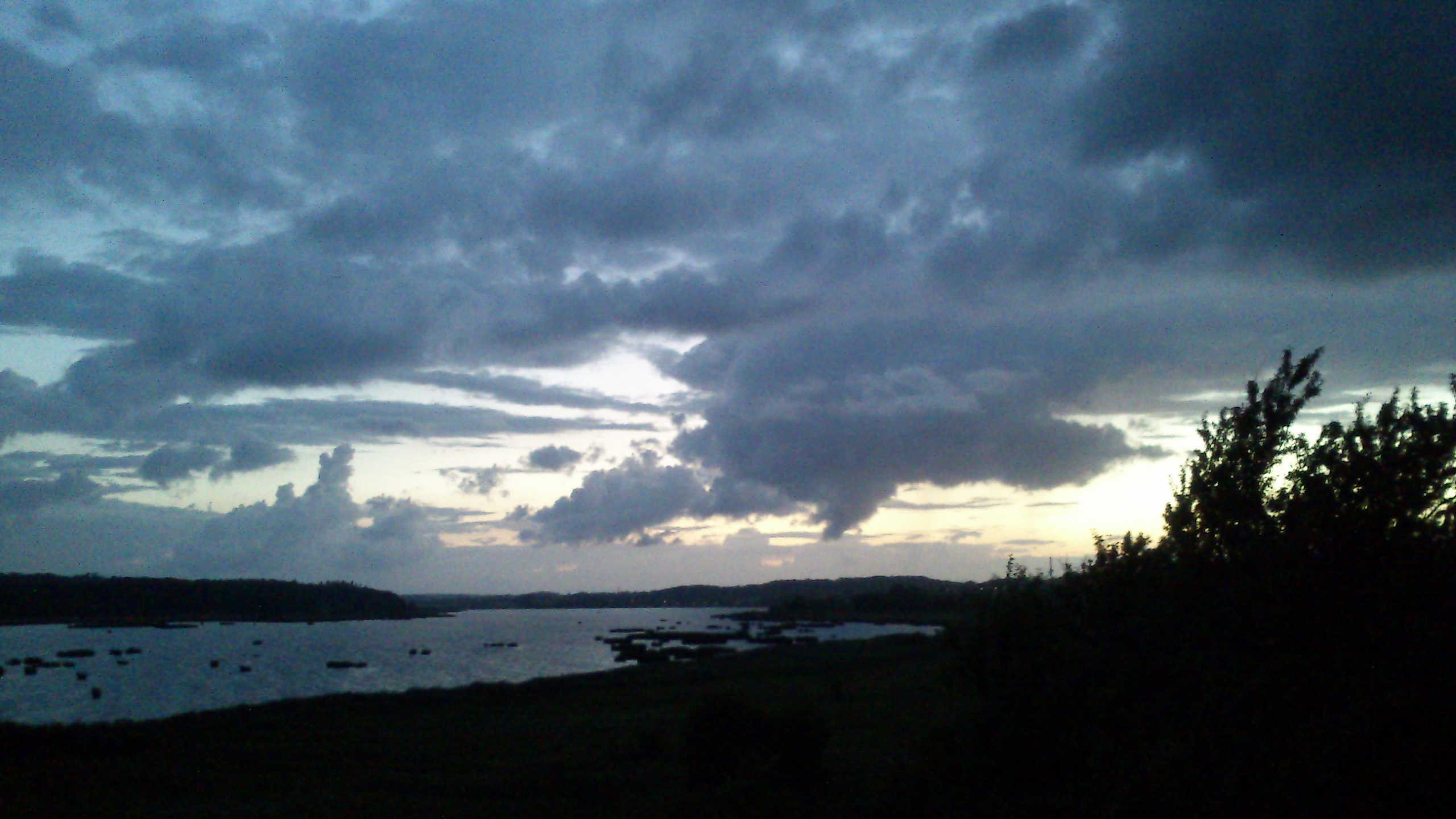
Sunset, windy weather and rainclouds across the lake.
