= Beder-Malling =

Coordinates: 56.1118°N 10.0041°E

- Town and urban area
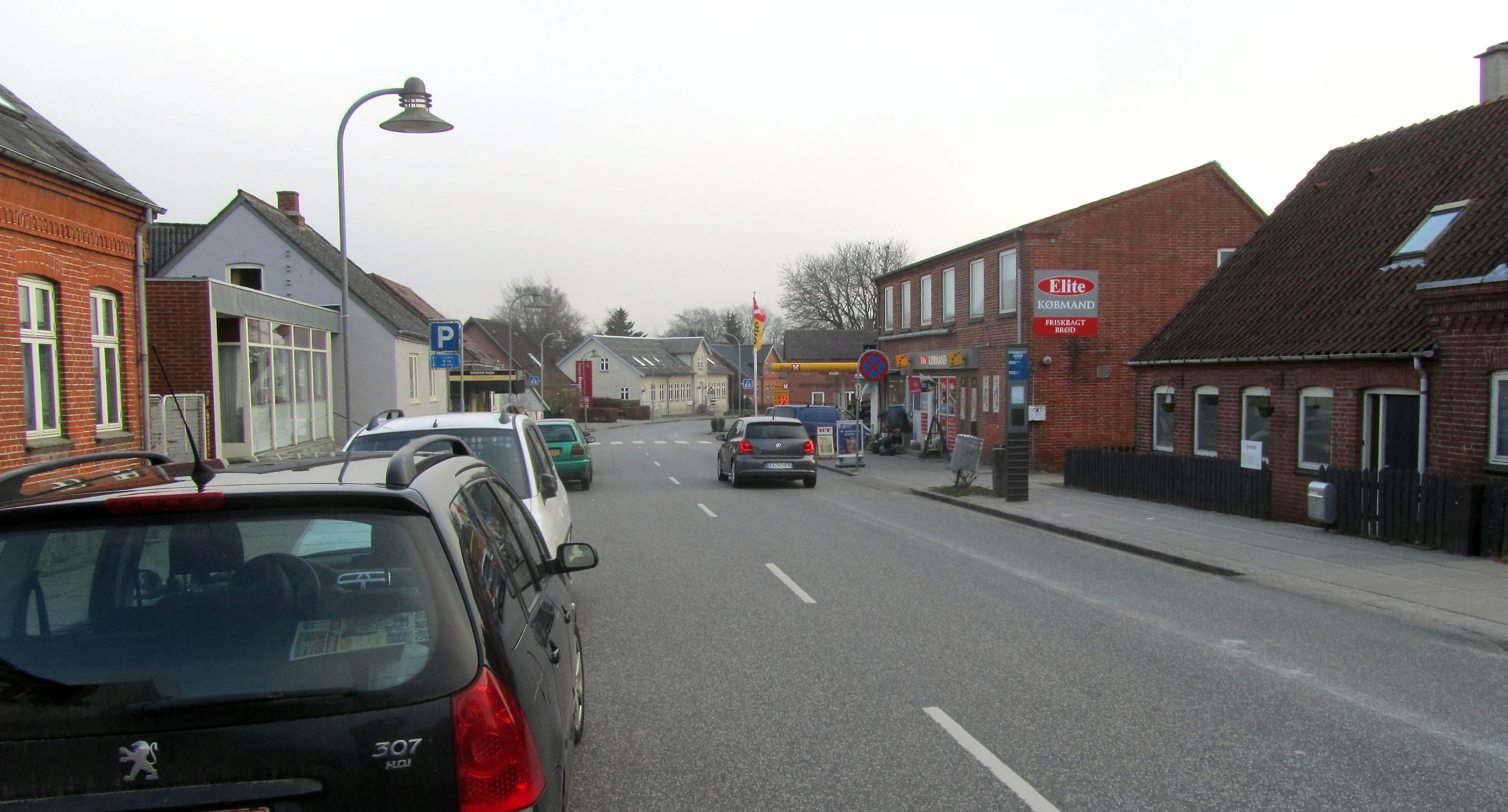
- Beder-Malling main street

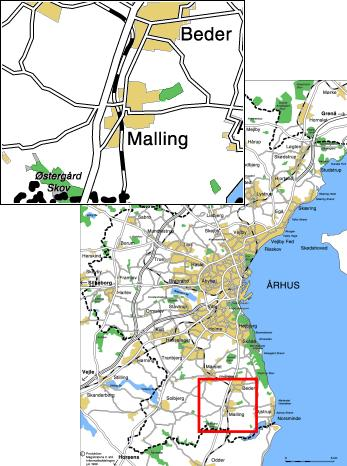
- Location of Beder-Malling in Aarhus Municipality
- Country: Kingdom of Denmark
- Regions of Denmark: Central Denmark Region
- Municipality: Aarhus Municipality
- Parish: Beder Sogn, Malling Sogn

Area
  - Urban: 4.2 km^{2} (1.6 sq mi)

Population (2026)
  - Urban: 9,492
  - Urban density: 2,300/km^{2} (5,900/sq mi)
  - Gender: 4,568 males and 4,924 females
- Time zone: UTC+1 (CET)
  - Summer (DST): UTC+2 (CEST)
- Postal code: 8340, 8330

Beder-Malling is a town in Aarhus Municipality, Central Denmark Region in Denmark, with a population of 9,492 (1 January 2026). Beder-Malling is situated South-east of Mårslet and 6 kilometers South of Aarhus. Beder-Malling is a new town formed when the towns of Beder and Malling merged into one conurbation in the 2010s and it officially became one urban area.
