= Lystrup =

- Town
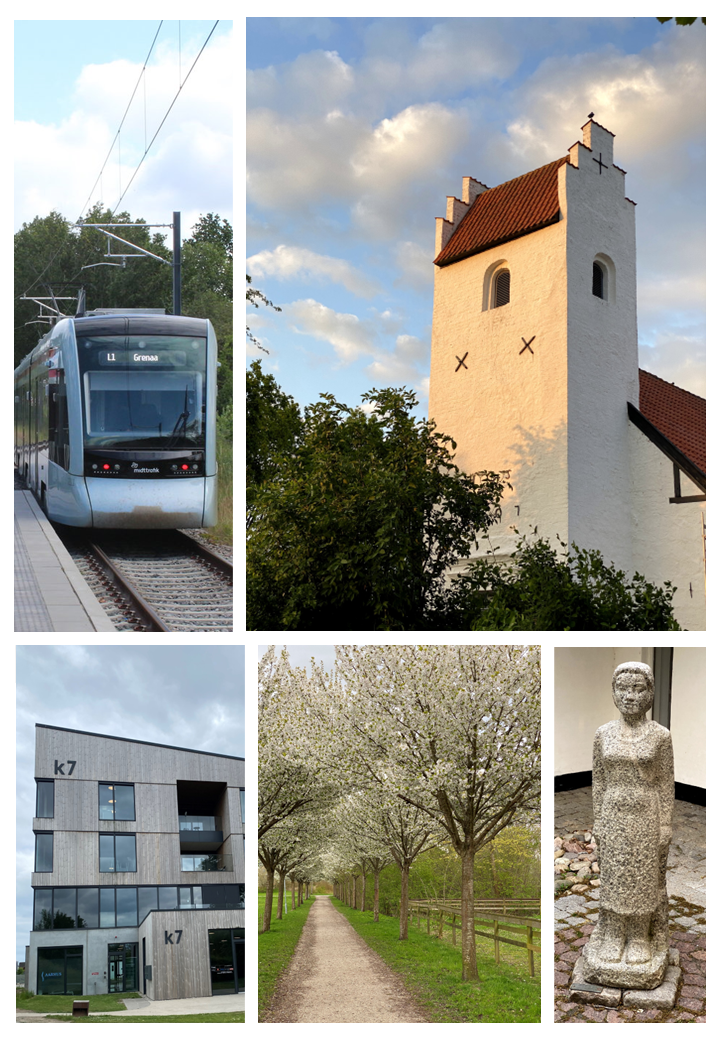
- Lystrup Station, Elsted Church, Health Center Kirstinelund, Æblehaven, Elsted-Girl

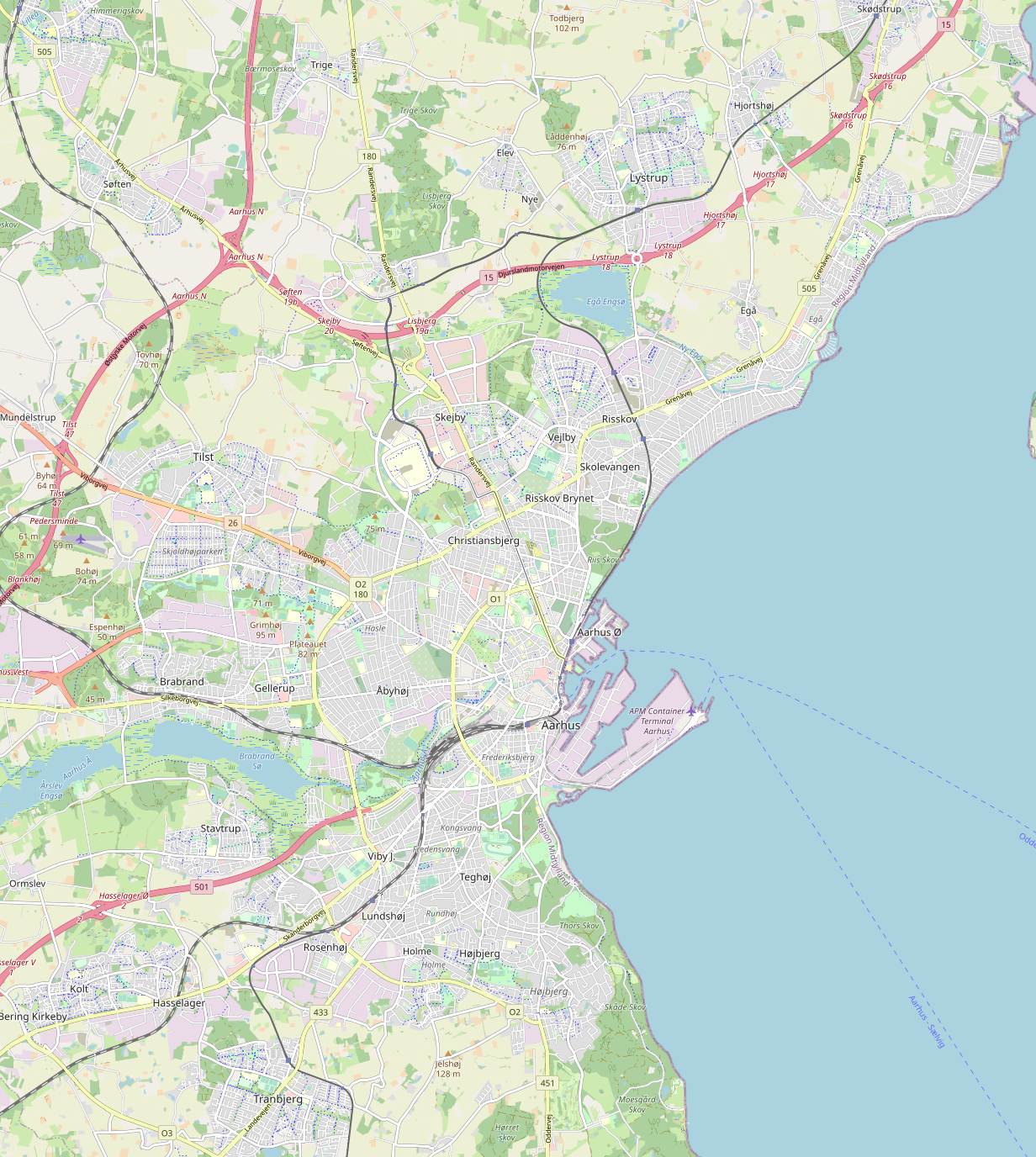
- Location in Denmark Lystrup (Aarhus)
- Coordinates: 56°14′34″N 10°14′12″E
- Country: Denmark
- Region: Region Midtjylland
- Municipality: Aarhus Municipality

Area
  - Urban: 5.3 km^{2} (2.0 sq mi)

Population (2026)
  - Urban: 10,116
  - Urban density: 1,900/km^{2} (4,900/sq mi)
  - Gender: 4,902 males and 5,214 females
- Time zone: UTC+1 (CET)
  - Summer (DST): UTC+2 (CEST)
- Postal code: DK-8520 Lystrup

Lystrup is a suburb of Aarhus, Denmark. It is located 9 km north of Aarhus city centre, west of Egå and the Bay of Aarhus. It had a population of 10,116 (1 January 2026), and is the second most populous urban area of Aarhus Municipality.

The larger local community of Lystrup-Elsted-Elev had a population of 12,034 as of 1 January 2023. Including Hjortshøj, with which the town has gradually merged, the total population of the combined urban area was 15,653.

== The name Lystrup (Etymology) ==
The name Lystrup originates from a local chieftain named Lyr, who lived in the area around the 13th century. Lyr was a devoted worshiper of the Norse gods and rejected both Christianity and the idea of ever having a church built on his land. Lyr’s burial mound still exists near the present-day Lystrup Church, which was built in 1989.

For many years, the area was known as Lyrstrup, and later it received its current name, Lystrup.

== Schools ==
Two schools (Lystrup Skole, Elsted Skole), several kindergartens, after-school centres and private daycarers makes Lystrup a suburb full of childlife, and the town has seen a substantial inflow of family residents in recent years.

== Shopping ==
Lystrup also provides good shopping possibilities, with several smaller, specialized boutiques along with one major, and three minor supermarkets. SuperBrugsen is one of the big co-operative supermarket chains in Denmark, Lystrup also has a Netto. Lystrup also provides a local library, for all citizens of Aarhus to loan books, free of charge.

== Sports ==
Lystrup also has great sport facilities, and the local club Lystrup IF offers a wide range of activities on all levels, including association football, water polo, tennis, handball, swimming, badminton, squash and basketball.

== Public transport ==
=== Light Rail ===
Lystrup serves as a hub in Denmark's first light rail network, which extends from Odder in the south through Aarhus to Grenå in the east. The town has two light rail stops: Lystrup Station and Hovmarken Station. There are departures nine times an hour, six towards Aarhus Central Station, taking 18 minutes with L1 and 32 minutes with L2.

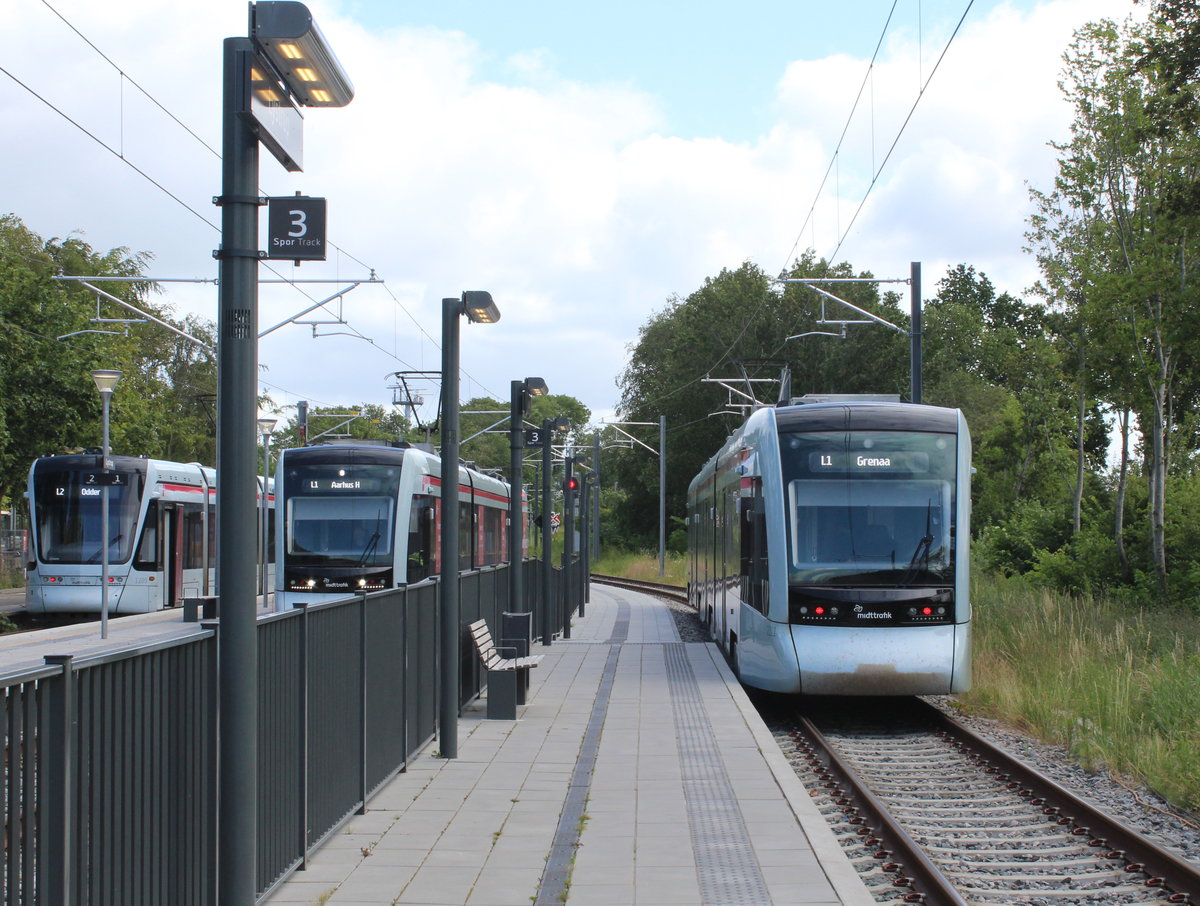
Lystrup Station

Lystrup Station

Lystrup Station is located in the town center. It serves as the terminus for the inner route (L2), which runs from Aarhus Central Station to Lystrup via Aarhus University Hospital. Additionally, the station is served by the Grenå Line (L1), which runs from Aarhus Central Station to Grenaa. Lystrup Station is the larger of the two light rail stops in the town, with three tracks.

Lystrup Station had 69,694 passengers in the first quarter of 2024, making it the seventh most used stop on the entire light rail system (L1 and L2), with Aarhus Central Station, Aarhus University Hospital, and Aarhus University occupying the top three spots. Of the passengers, 46,804 boarded L1 (Grenå Line) and 22,890 boarded L2 (inner route/Odder Line).

Hovmarken Station

Hovmarken Station is a light rail station in eastern Lystrup, served exclusively by the Grenå Line (L1). In the winter of 2023/2024, the Aarhus City Council proposed closing the Hovmarken light rail stop. The proposal was made due to Aarhus Letbane's difficulty in adhering to the timetable on the Grenå Line. The proposal was approved in April 2024, and the station will be closed in late summer 2024.

Hovmarken Station had 4,286 boardings in the first quarter of 2024.

=== Buses ===
Lystrup is served by the yellow city bus lines from Aarbus, owned by the regional transit company Midttrafik. Aarbus handles all city bus operations in Aarhus Municipality. Aarbus serves Lystrup with city bus lines 16 and 18, night bus 45, and a school bus to Egå Gymnasium.

- Line 16 runs from Mejlby through Lystrup over Aarhus University to Mårslet.
- Line 18 runs from Lystrup over Aarhus University to Moesgaard Museum.
- Line 32 (School Bus) runs from Lystrup to Egå Gymnasium.
- Line 45 (Night Bus) runs from Aarhus City Hall to Lystrup via AUH/University Hospital.

== Recreational areas ==
Lystrup has a forest and four parks.

Centrally in the town, north of the railroad, lies Southern Forest (Danish: Sønderskov), officially rated as a dog forest where visitors may let their dogs roam freely. Southern forest is used for a wide range of recreational activities such as horseback-riding, jogging and scouting.

The four parks are Hovmarken, Indelukket, Æblehaven and Hedeskovparken.

Egå Engsø lies south of the city and from it the river New Egå (Danish: Ny Egå) runs to the coast and bay.

== Churches ==
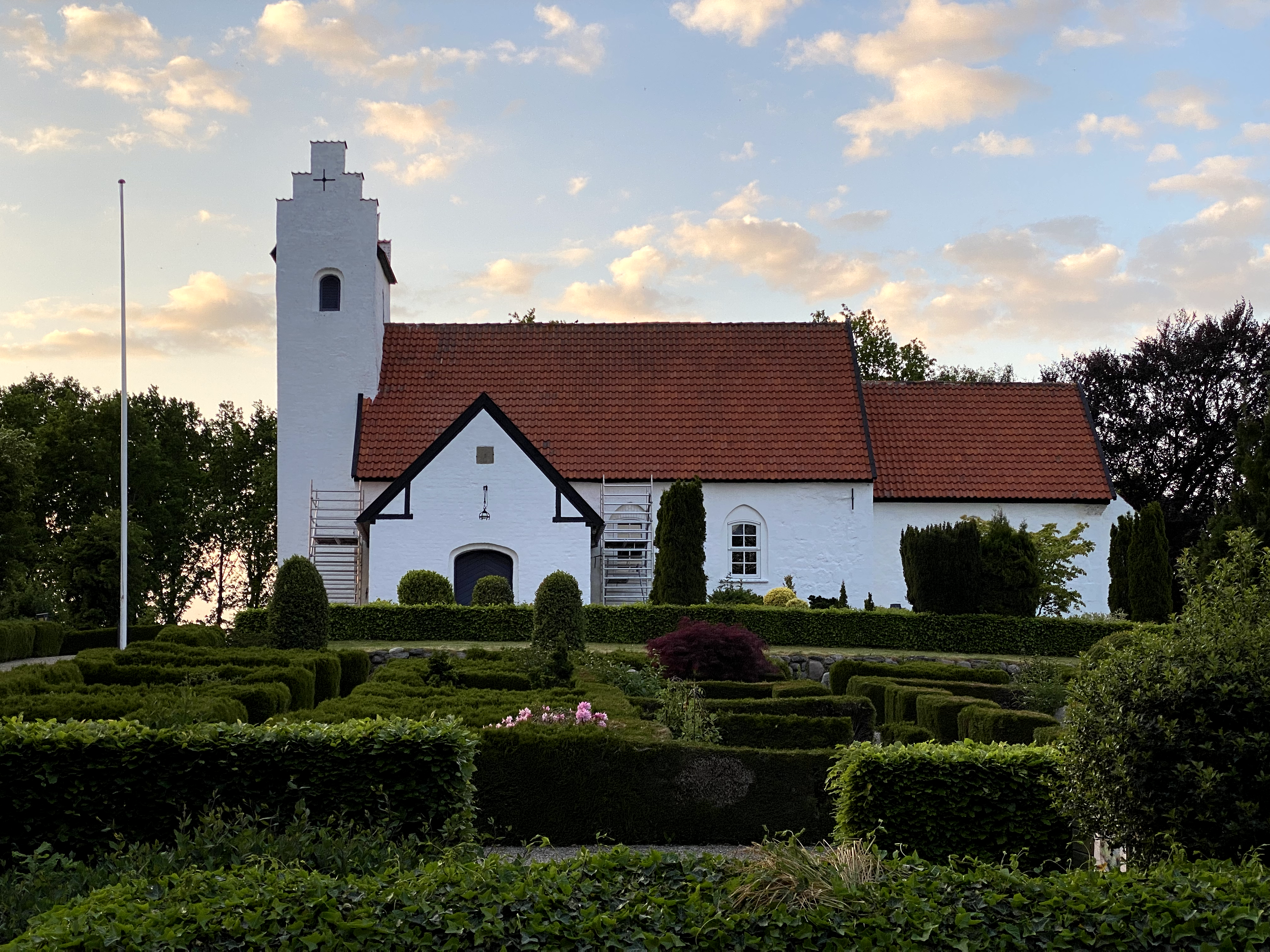
Elsted Church (Built 1210)

In Lystrup, there are two parishes: Elsted Parish and Lystrup Parish.

Lystrup Parish was separated from Elsted Parish in 1990. The division was both geographical and based on population. At the time of the division, Elsted Parish had 3,901 residents, and Lystrup Parish had 3,926 residents.

Lystrup Church is the new church in town, built in 1989. Elsted Church was built in 1210.

== Industry ==
Lystrup is home to a large business area with several well-known companies such as Elopak, Terma, and Millarco. A total of 3,507 companies were registered in the postal code 8520 as of 1 March 2024.

List of major companies in the town:

- Elopak Denmark A/S
- Terma A/S
- HiFi Klubben Danmark A/S
- Millarco International A/S
- Plantorama A/S
- Inspari A/S
- Swire Renewable Energy A/S
- ID Hair Company A/S
- Firtal Web A/S
- Stantræk A/S

== Media ==
Local news in Lystrup is covered by the media outlets Aarhus Stiftstidende, LystrupLiv og Jyllands-posten (JP Aarhus, Aarhus Onsdag og Din Avis Aarhus).

== Notable people ==
- Erik Bue Pedersen (born 1952 in Lystrup) a former Danish handball player; competed in the 1980 Summer Olympics

== Neighbouring towns ==
- Elsted
- Elev
- Nye
- Hjortshøj
- Egå
