= Danish Runic Inscription 107 =

Coordinates: 55.6749°N 12.5755°E

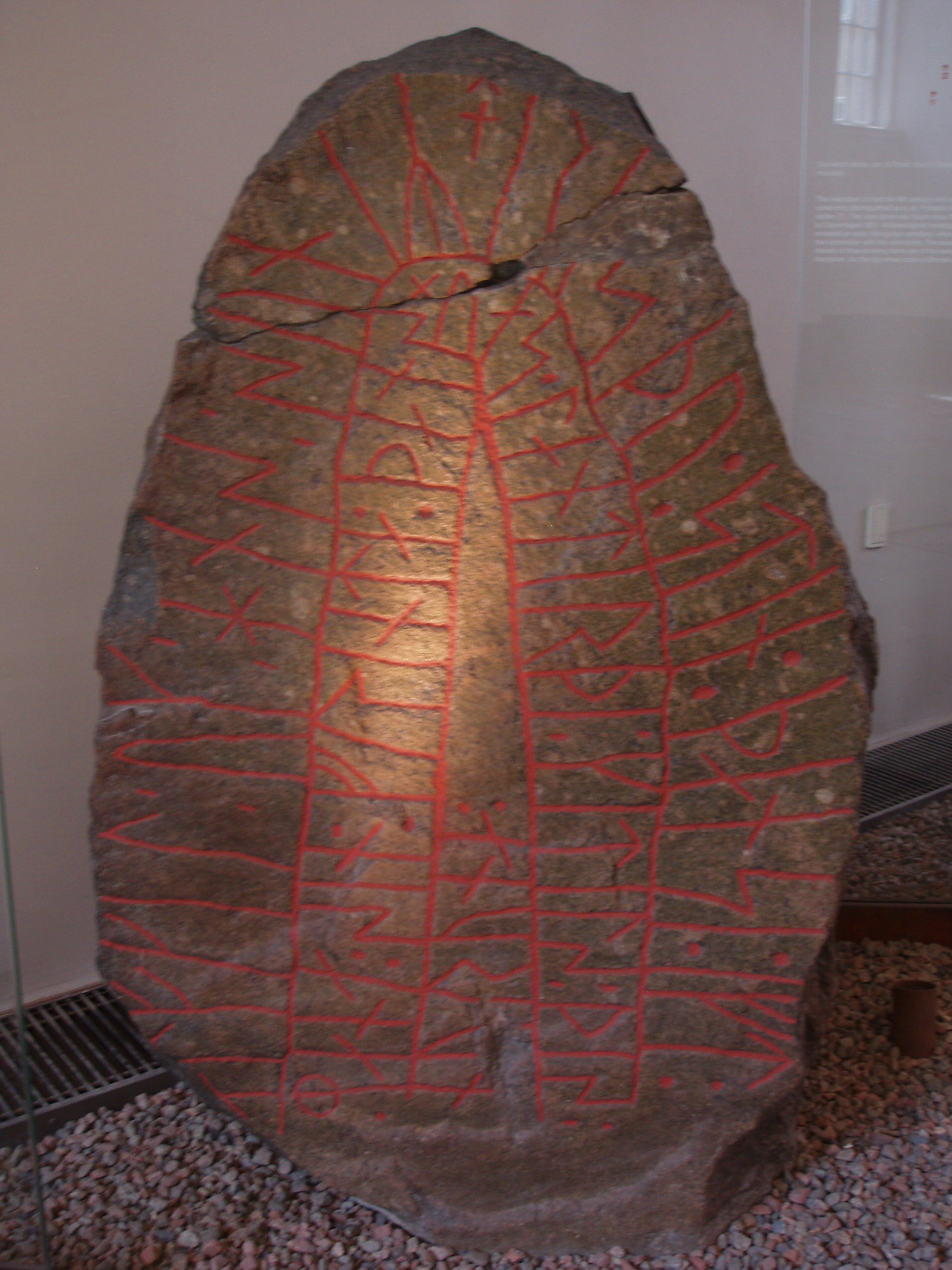
The runestone from Egå.

Danish Runic Inscription 107 or DR 107 is the Rundata listing for a Viking Age memorial runestone that was found at Egå, Denmark.

== Description ==
The inscription on DR 107 consists of three runic text bands carved in the younger futhark with two bands in arches with the third band in the center. The inscription is classified as being carved in runestone style RAK, which is the classification for runic text bands that have straight ends with no attached serpent or beast heads. The runestone was first recorded, with its top section missing, as being part of a wall in Egå. Before the historic significance of runestones was understood, they were often re-used as material in the construction of bridges, walls, and buildings. It was noted that prior to this, the stone had been in the bank near a bridge, and may have been associated with some local grave mounds. The top section was located in 1839, and the repaired stone is 1.08 metres (3.5 ft) in height. The runestone was moved to Copenhagen, and is now in the Danish National Museum.

The runic text states that the stone was raised as a memorial by Alfkell and his sons in memory of his deceased relative Manni. Manni is described as being a landhirþiʀ or landhirði, an Old Norse word that means "guard of land" but is often translated as being a land or estate overseer or steward. Another inscription which uses this term is DR 134 in Ravnkilde. The owner of the land is named as Ketill the Norwegian. Here the word norrøna means Norseman but was used in Denmark at that time to denote a Norwegian. A small cross was carved at the top of the stone within the runic band separating the words suniʀ and risþu.

The runestone is known locally as Egå-stenen (English: The Egå Stone).

== Inscription ==
=== Transliteration of the runes into Latin characters ===
alfkil ÷ uk ÷ hns ÷ suniʀ ÷ risþu : stin : þansi : ift : ¶ * mana : sin : frinta : þans × uas * lantirþi ÷ kitils ÷ þis ÷ ¶ nuruna ÷

=== Transcription into Old Norse ===
Alfkel ok hans syniʀ resþu sten þænsi æft Manna, sin frænda, þans was landhirþiʀ Kætils þæs norrøna.

=== Translation in English ===
Alfkell and his sons raised this stone in memory of Manni, their kinsman, who was Ketill the Norwegian's estate-steward.
