= Elev =

Coordinates: 56.1430°N 10.1156°E

- Town
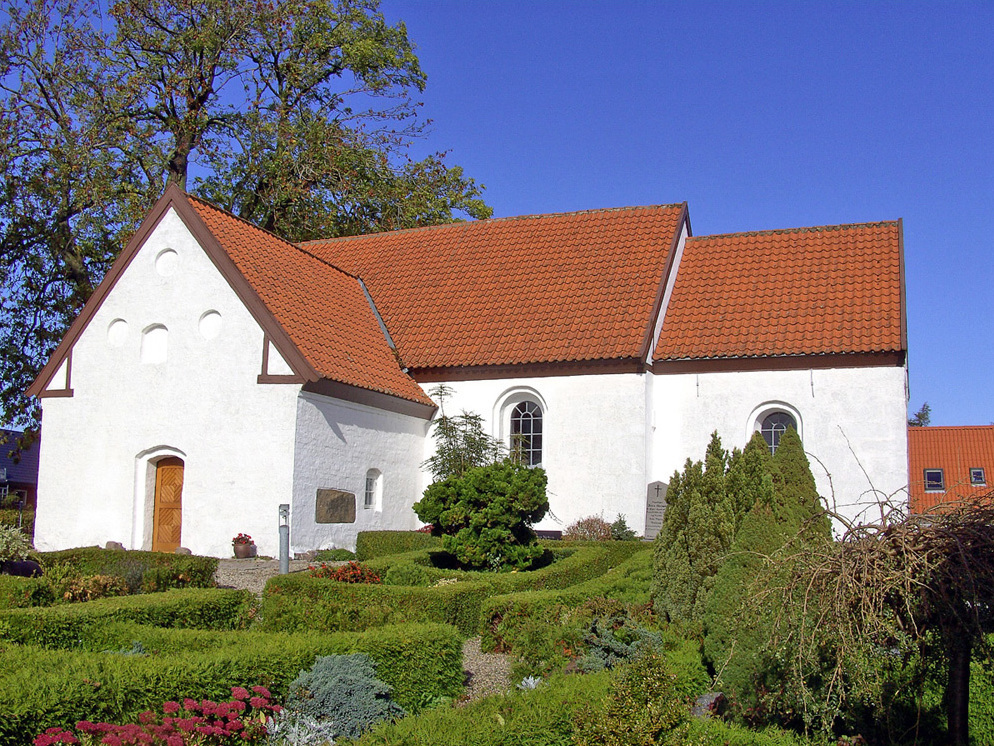
- Elev Church

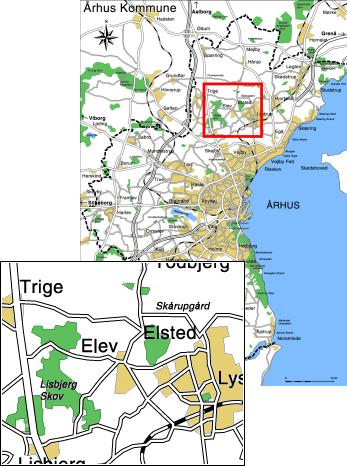
- Location of Elev in Aarhus Municipality
- Country: Kingdom of Denmark
- Regions of Denmark: Central Denmark Region
- Municipality: Aarhus Municipality
- Parish: Elev Sogn

Area
  - Urban: 0.7 km^{2} (0.27 sq mi)

Population (2026)
  - Urban: 1,972
  - Urban density: 2,800/km^{2} (7,300/sq mi)
- Postal code: 8520 Lystrup

Elev is a small town in Aarhus Municipality, Central Denmark Region in Denmark with a population of 1,972 (1 January 2026).

Elev is situated 12 kilometers northwest of Aarhus on the northern slopes of Egådalen valley, between Lystrup and Trige, close to the motorway Djurslandsmotorvejen, which connects with E45. Elev is part of Elev Parish where Elev Church is situated.

Since 2016 a new suburb named Nye is to be built on the southeastern outskirts of Elev.
