= Nye, Denmark =

- Town
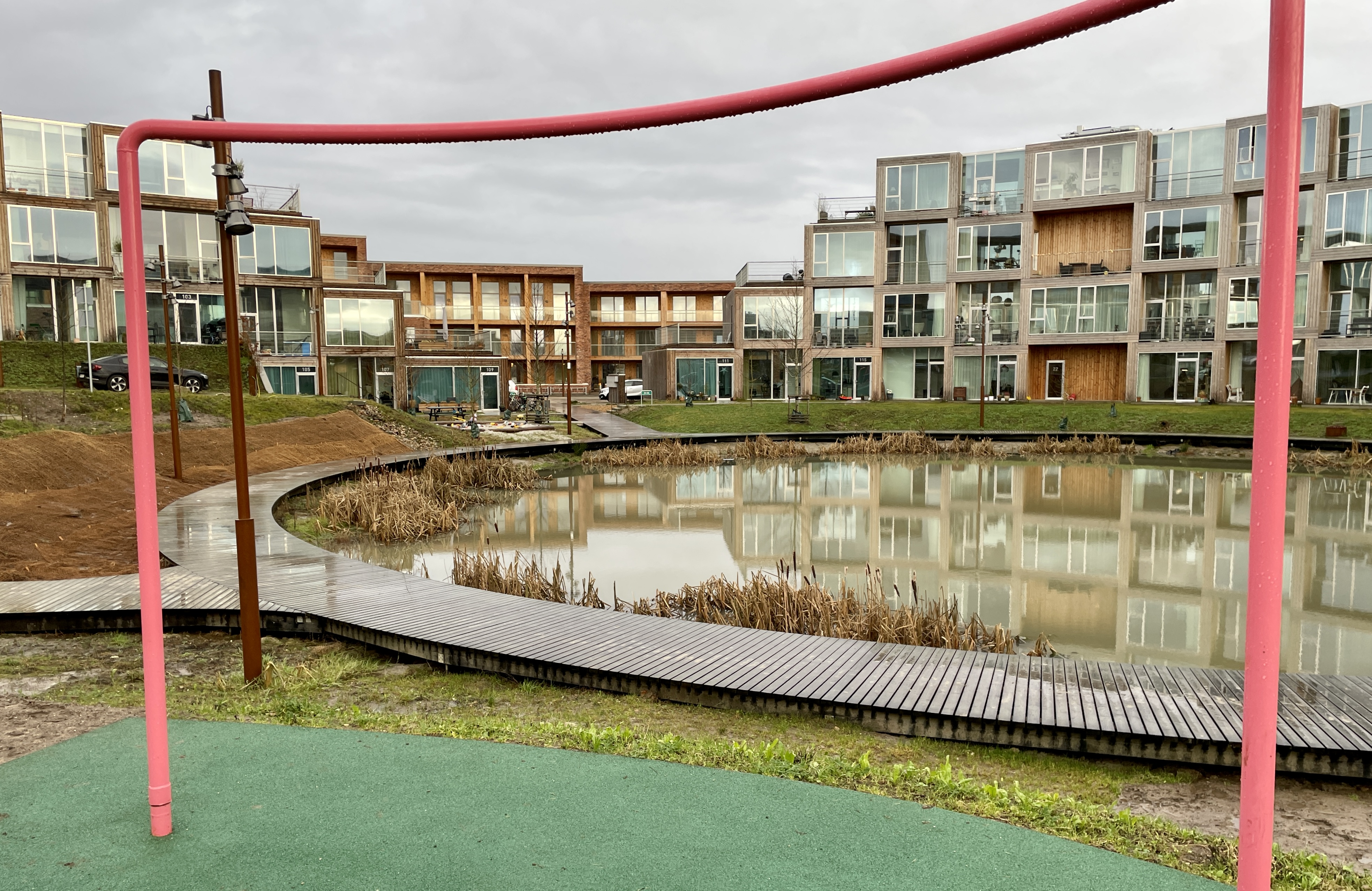
- Inside "Sneglehusene"

- Location in Denmark Nye, Denmark (Central Denmark Region)
- Coordinates: 56°13′38.18″N 10°12′2.51″E
- Country: Kingdom of Denmark
- Regions of Denmark: Central Denmark Region
- Municipality: Aarhus Municipality
- Parish: Elev Sogn
- Postal code: 8200 Aarhus N

Nye is a developing and upcoming satellite town to Aarhus located in Elev Parish and in Aarhus Municipality under the Central Denmark Region.

== Geography ==
The town is situated 10 kilometers from the center of Aarhus and extends northward from the village of Elev and two kilometers eastward from Lystrup.

== Transport ==
Nye houses Nye light rail station, which connects the city with Aarhus, Djursland, and surrounding towns.

== Development ==
Nye is a city development project where the first phase is under construction. The first phase consists of approximately 650 homes, institutions, and grocery stores. Construction began in 2016, while the first residents moved in during 2018.

When Nye is fully developed, the district will house up to 15,000-17,000 inhabitants and stretch to Egå Engsø and Djurslandsmotorvejen to the south, which connects with E45.

The development of Nye takes place in collaboration between Aarhus Municipality, Aarhus Vand, and Tækker Group.

== Awards ==
In 2022, Nye was awarded the City Planning Prize for visionary and nature-based urban development.
