= Erik Bue Pedersen =

Danish handball player (born 1952)

Erik Bue Pedersen (born January 22, 1952) is a Danish former handball player who competed in the 1980 Summer Olympics.

He was born in Lystrup near Aarhus, Denmark.

At club level he played for the Aarhus-based club Skovbakken IF. He debuted for the Danish national team on November 22, 1973 against the Soviet Union.

In 1980 he finished ninth with the Danish team in the Olympic tournament. He played five matches and scored five goals.

In total he would go on to play 70 matches for the Danish national team, scoring 122 goals over a 7 year period.
