= Egå Engsø =

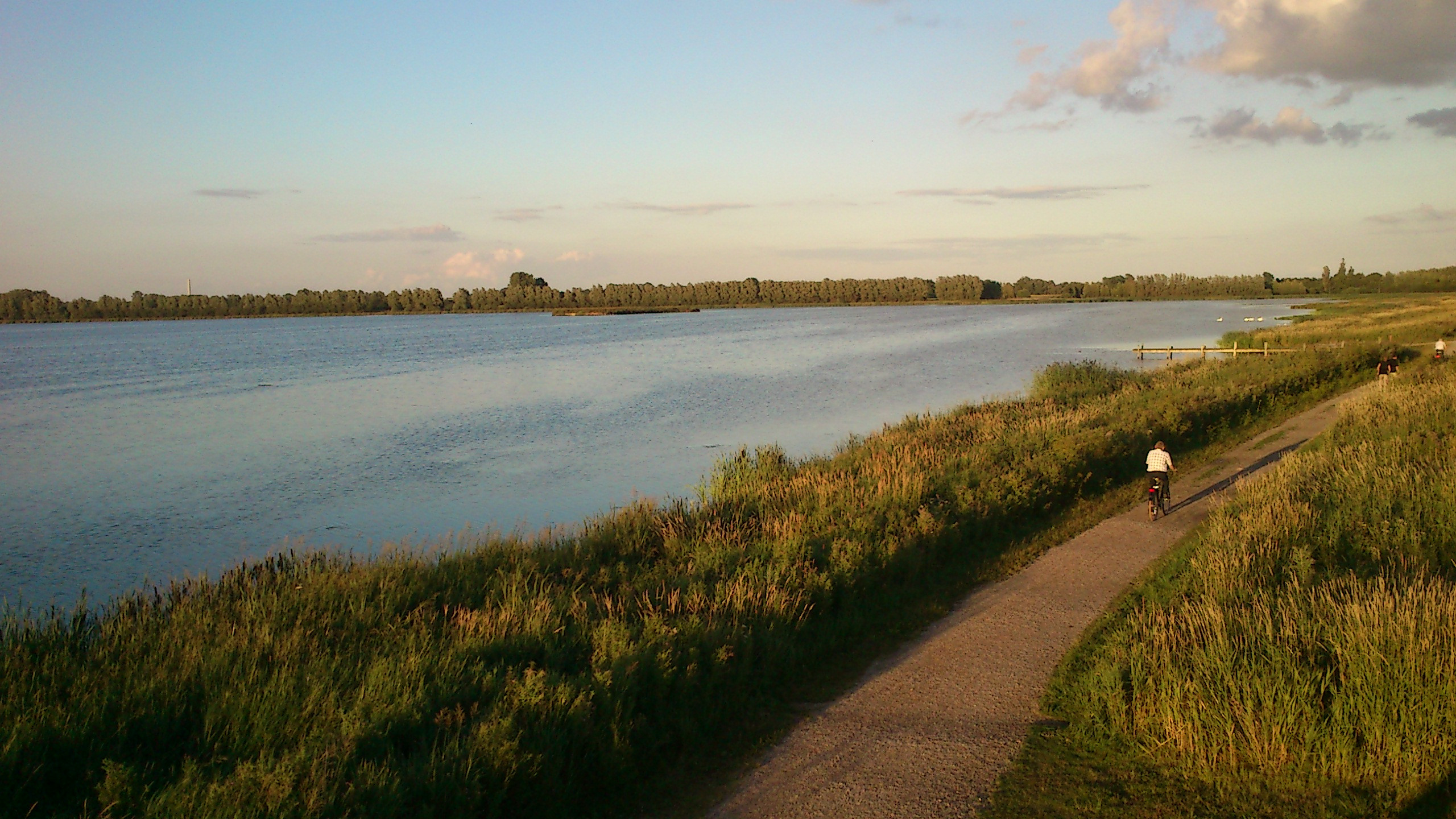
- View of the eastern end of Egå Engsø, from the bird tower.

- Location within Denmark
- Location: Midtjylland region
- Coordinates: 56.218°N 10.221°E
- Type: recreated lake and wet meadow
- Primary inflows: Egå, Ellebækken
- Primary outflows: Egå
- Basin countries: Denmark
- Surface area: 1.15 km^{2} (0.44 sq mi)
- Average depth: 1 m (3 ft 3 in)
- Max. depth: 1.7 m (5 ft 7 in)
- Shore length^{1}: 5.2 km (3.2 mi)
- Settlements: Aarhus
- ^{1} Shore length is not a well-defined measure.

Egå Engsø (lit. 'Oak Stream Meadow Lake') is an artificial lake and wetland site located in the north of the town of Aarhus between Vejlby, Risskov and Lystrup. Engsø means 'meadow lake' and Egå means 'oak stream', referring to the stream that drains the lake into the Aarhus bay. The lake area is bordered by the Djursland motorway to the north and the Aarhus-Grenaa railway and the municipal heating pipes from Studstrup Power Station to the south and west.

== Background ==
Egå Engsø was created by re-flooding meadows on land previously drained in the 1950s for agricultural use. By the 1990s the water quality and natural ecosystem in and around the Egå river into which the site drained had declined due to the effect of nitrate fertilizer (eutrophication) use, through intensive farming in the area. Aarhus Municipality, Aarhus County and the Danish Forest and Nature Agency resolved to construct the lake as part of Vandmiljøplan II (English: Action Plan for the Aquatic Environment II) from 1998 to reduce this effect through bacterial denitrification. Another major reason for initiating the project, have been the need for a strengthened defence against increasing rainfalls. The lake was created alongside work on the new Djursland motorway, and completed in 2006. Aarhus municipality is single owner.

== Surroundings ==
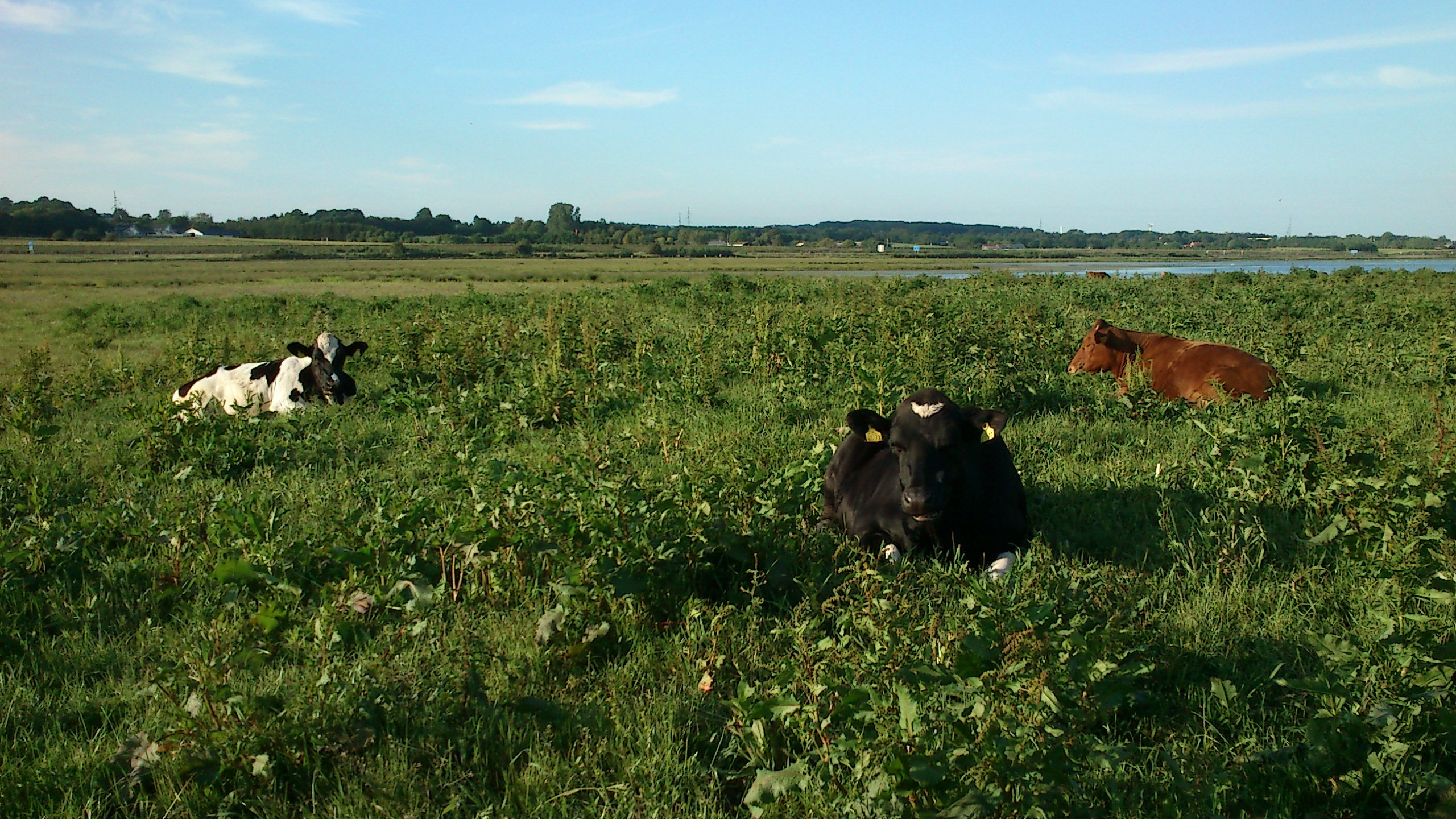
The wet meadows at the lake brinks are grazed by cattle.

The lake covers approximately 115 hectares (280 acres), with another c. 100 hectares (250 acres) hectares of reedbeds and meadows. Access to the lake is restricted in most places, as the wet meadows at the lake brinks are reserved for grazing cattle. The grazing helps to restrict the growth of shrubs and woody plants and maintain a natural meadow habitat. It also increases the biodiversity. The amount of water in the lake, varies a great deal (by design) with weather and season, but under normal conditions, the average depth is about 1 m. Water levels can rise by an additional meter or more. The lake contains a number of fish species, fishing is prohibited however, as is swimming.

On the south brink, there is a bird watching tower erected in 2007, whose construction was funded by Australian wine firm Banrock Station. The lake attracts many different bird species, often in large flocks, with 188 species registered up to 2015.

A path c. 5 km long (with each km marked) runs round the circumference of the lake, suitable for walking, rollerblading, running or biking. There are 2 parking lots; near the motorway junction from Lystrupvej at the north east corner and from Viengevej in the south east corner. There are access to and from the villages of Terp and Vejby for bikes and pedestrians, through passageways underneath the railway line on the western side. On the southern brinks are an activity and learning area for children and schools, modelled on a Stone Age settlement, and a number of shelters which may be booked for camping. It is a popular area and it is a statutory goal of the Aarhus municipality to make it publicly accessible and attractive for the citizens.

== Special flora and fauna ==
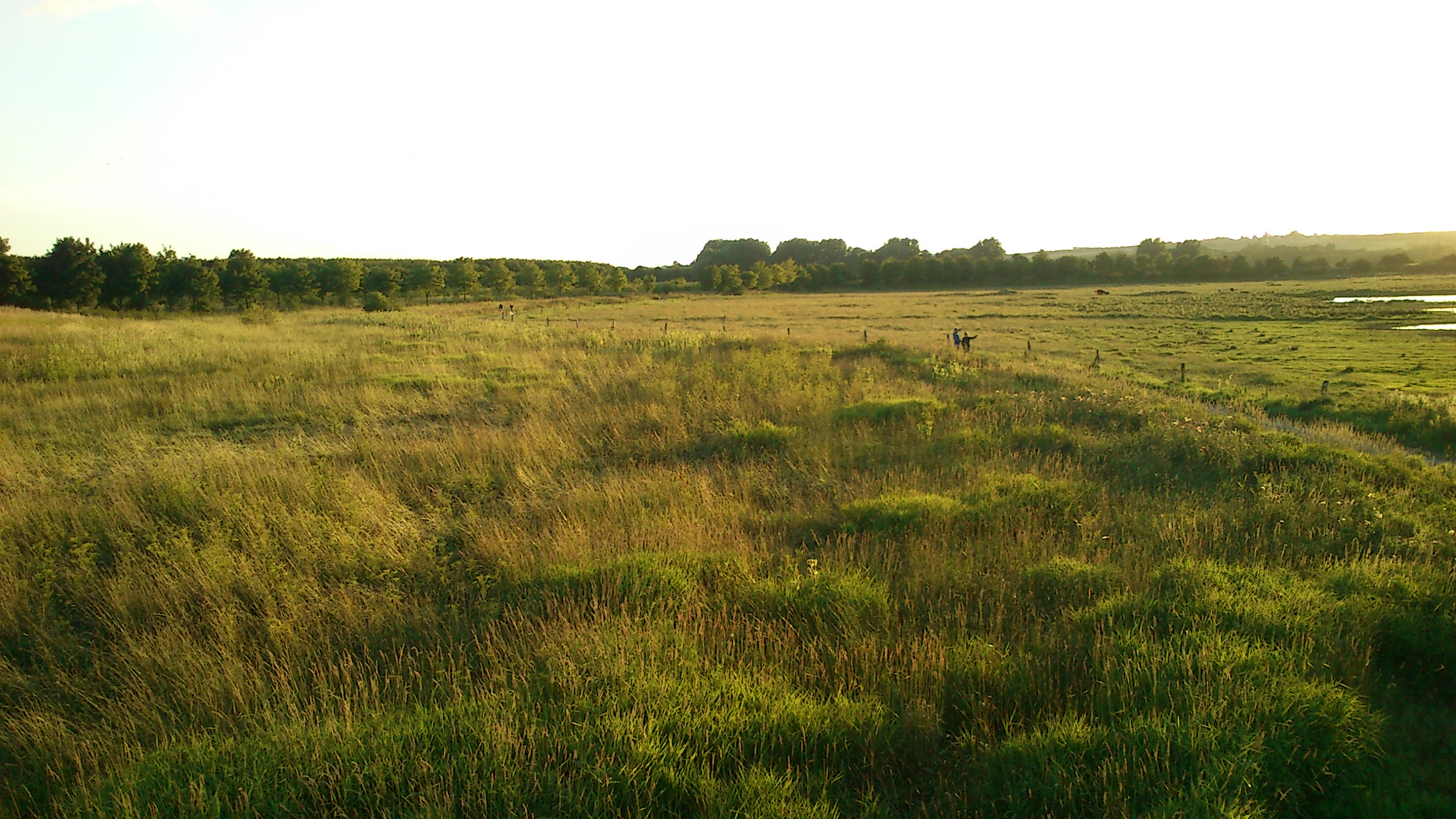
View across the surrounding meadows from the bird watching tower.

Many specimens of the flora and fauna at Egå Engsø, are either rare or relatively rare in Denmark. Some are on the Danish Red List (under IUCN Red List) and/or protected under different habitat directives of the European Union. Here is a few examples:

- Common comfrey (Danish: Læge-Kulsukker) is growing here, but is rare in Denmark. It is slightly poisonous and carcinogenic, but have nevertheless been used extensively in folklore-medicine as a wound healing plant among other uses.
- The globally endangered (EN) thick shelled river mussel has established here. It is rare in Denmark and is to be protected under the EU habitat directive (II and IV). It is an indicator species of good water quality and important for nature management in general.
- Short-eared owls are living and foraging here. It is endangered (EN) and relatively rare in Denmark.
- The lake area occasionally houses resting white storks, a critically endangered (CR) and relatively rare bird in Denmark.
- Eurasian spoonbills are resting here and they are vulnerable (VU) and relatively rare in Denmark.
- The ferruginous ducks living here, are rare in Denmark and near threatened (NT) on a global scale.
- Black terns are here and they are endangered (EN) and relatively rare in Denmark.

Parts of the meadows surrounding Egå Engsø, are grazed by cattle in the warmer months of the year, to create ideal conditions for the emerging flora and fauna associated with wet meadows.

== Archaeological finds ==
In the Stone Age, the Egå Engsø area was a small part of a much larger fjord, that filled the entire Egå valley and stretched from the Bay of Aarhus to Lisbjerg. Moesgård Museum in Aarhus have found numerous traces from the earliest human settlements, boats and kitchen middens in and around the Egå valley. In the extensive primeval woods of those days, the Stone Age people hunted for aurochs, elk and wild boars and in the fjord they engaged in fishing, collecting shellfish and whaling even. Orcas was an important part of the meals of the stone age people at the Bay of Aarhus. The whales where killed with throwing spears and lances and the hunt was carried out from their long narrow dugout canoes, according to some sources. Bone remains from at least 16 individuals of the heavy orcas, have been accounted for at the site. Some of the excavated dugouts from the early 1990s to 2001 at 'Lystrup Enge', have been carbon-14 dated to the years 5,210-4,910 BC and is thus the oldest known boats in Northern Europe at present.

== Gallery ==
Facilities

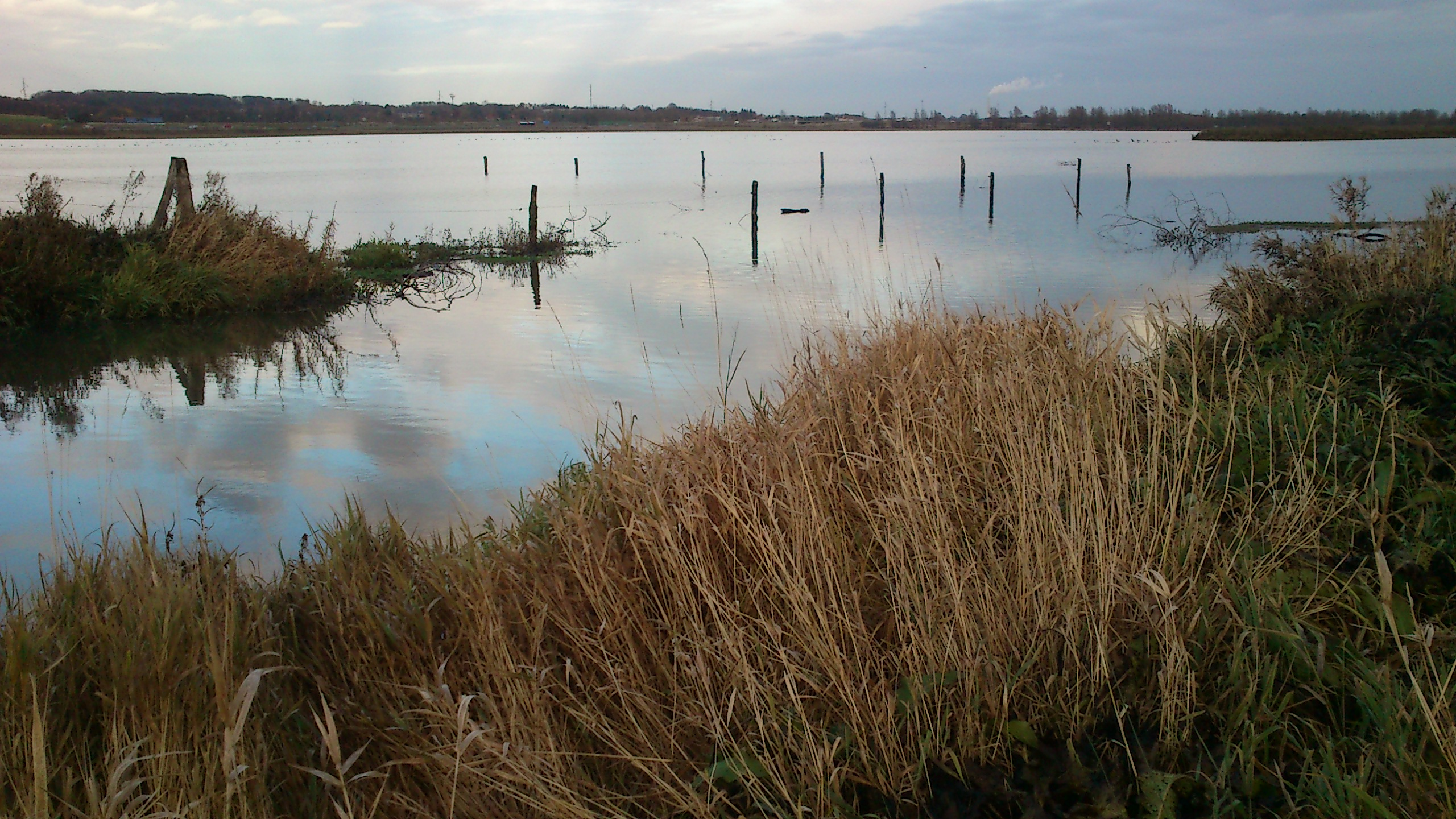
The stream of Egå enters the lake.

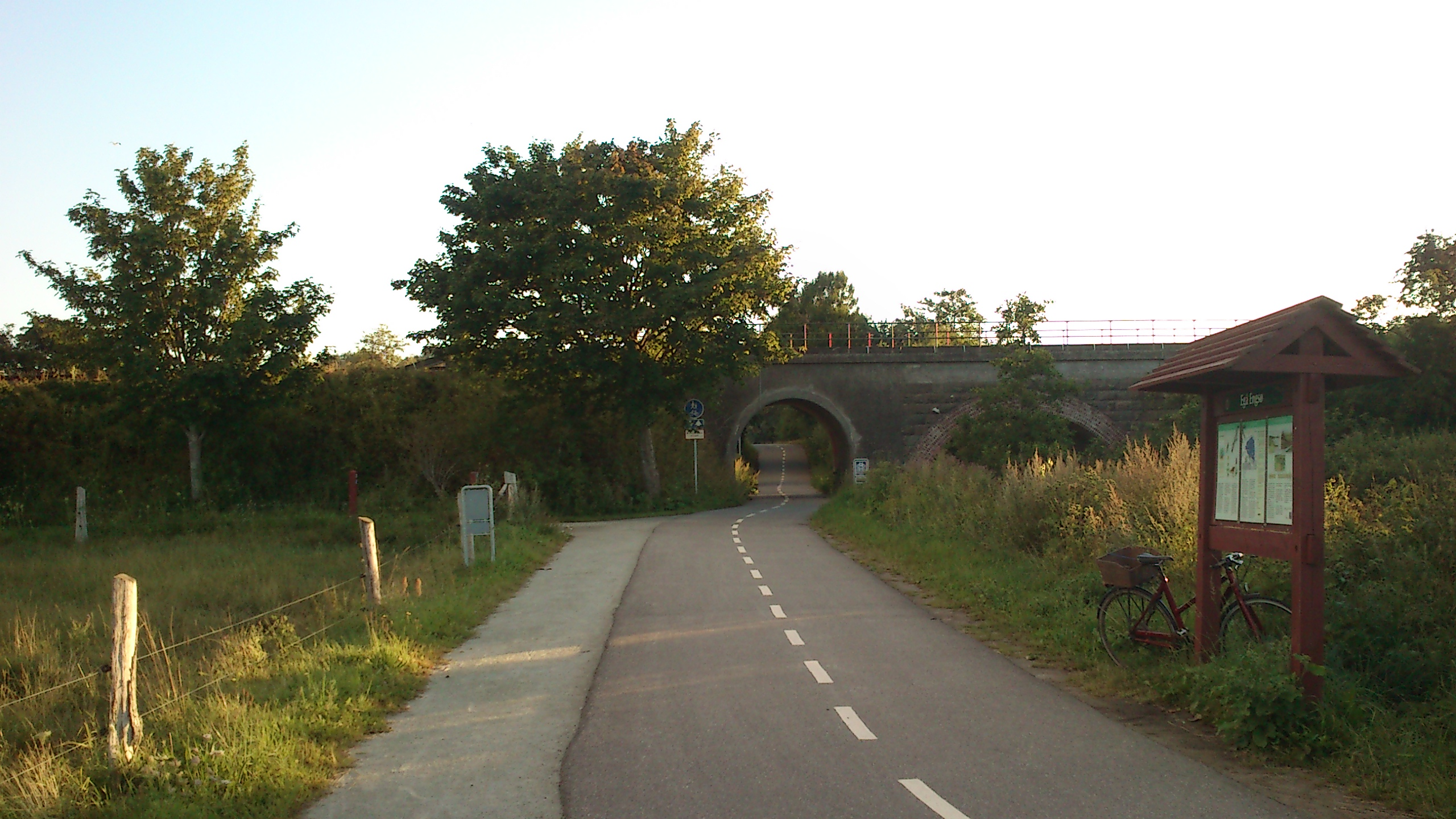
Asphalted pathway, tunnel and information boards.

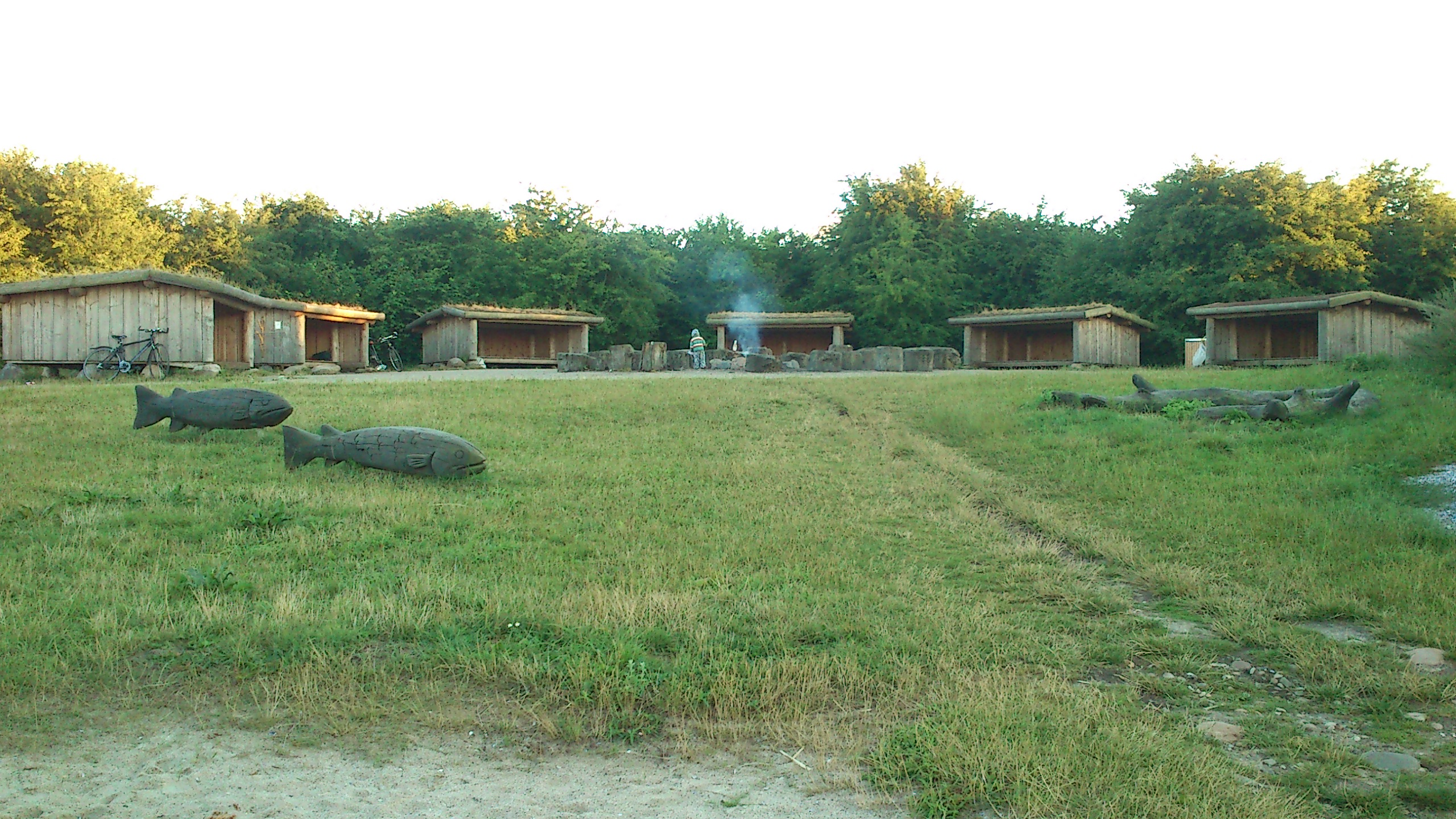
Activity- and learning-area.

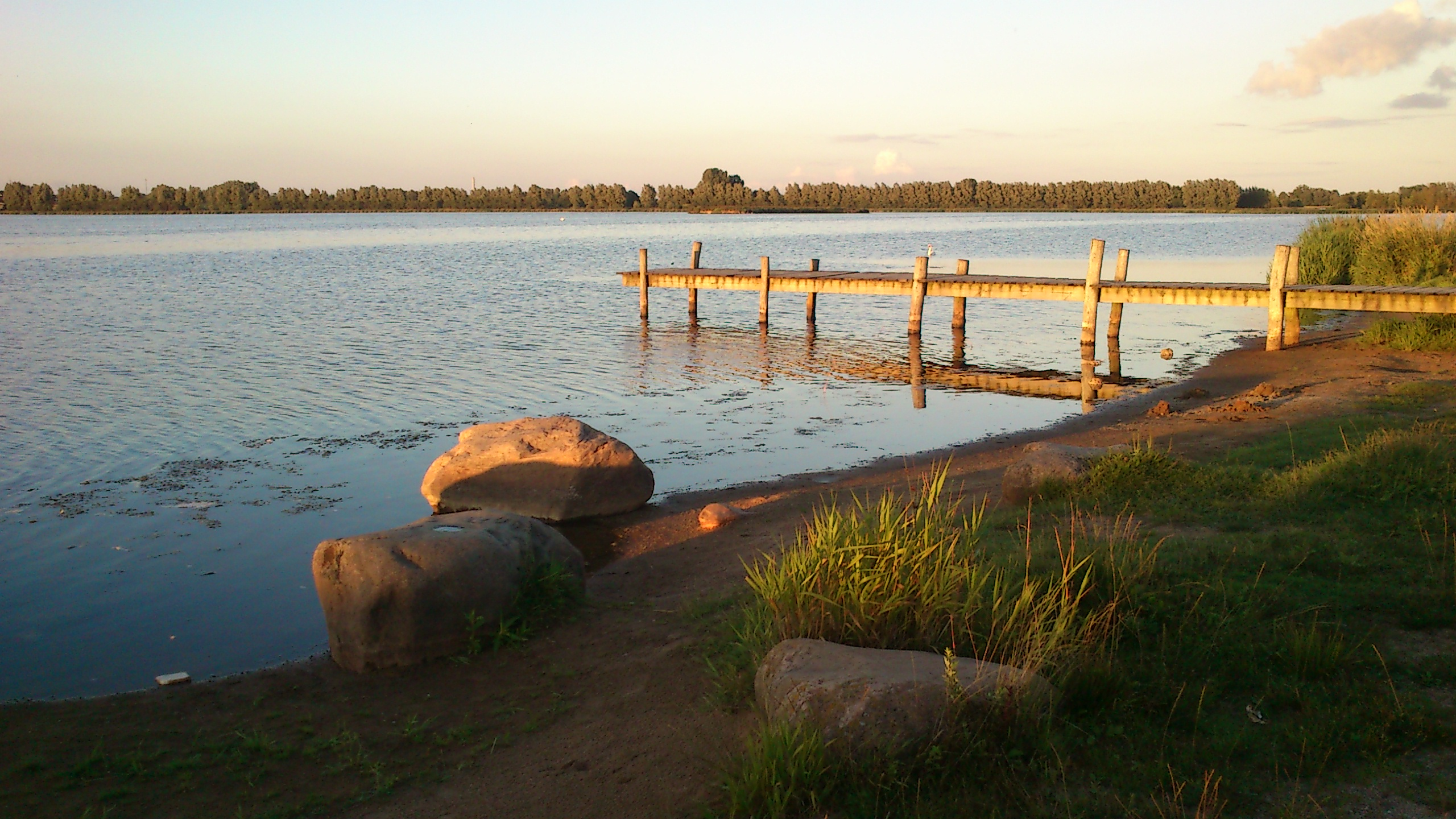
Sunset at the lake.

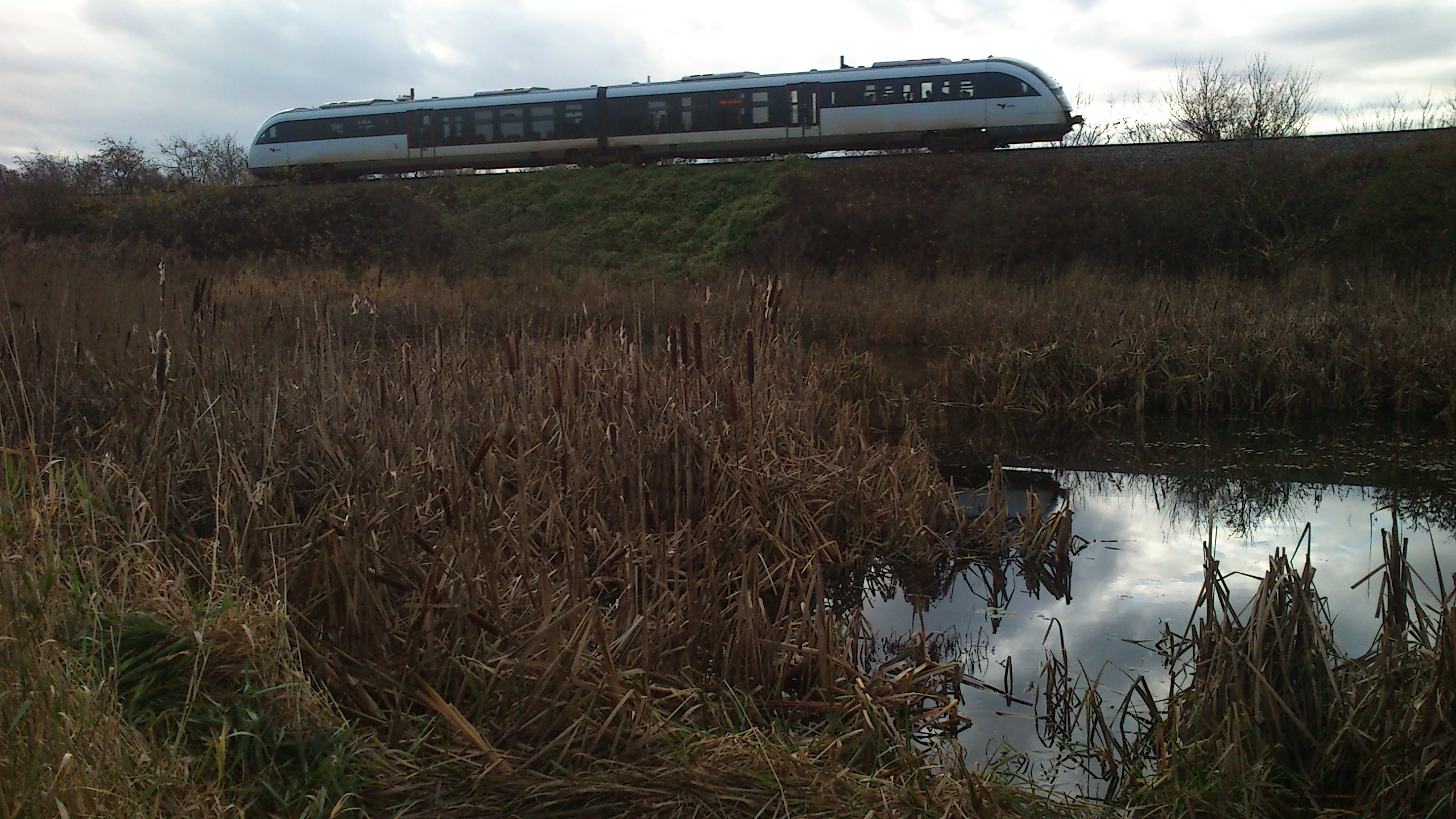
The Grenaa Line railway sweeps west around the meadows.

Nature

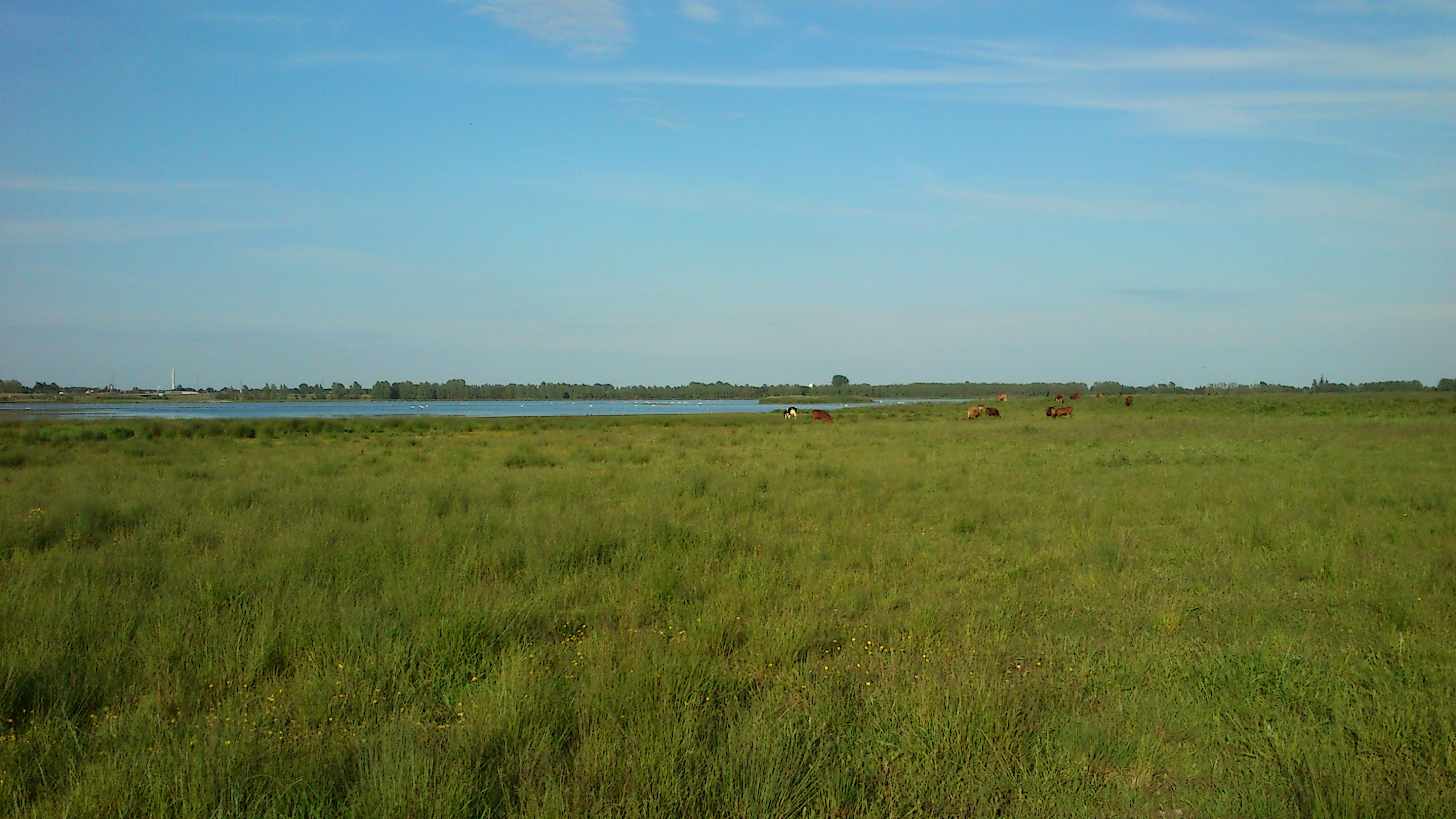
The grazed wet meadows are extensive.

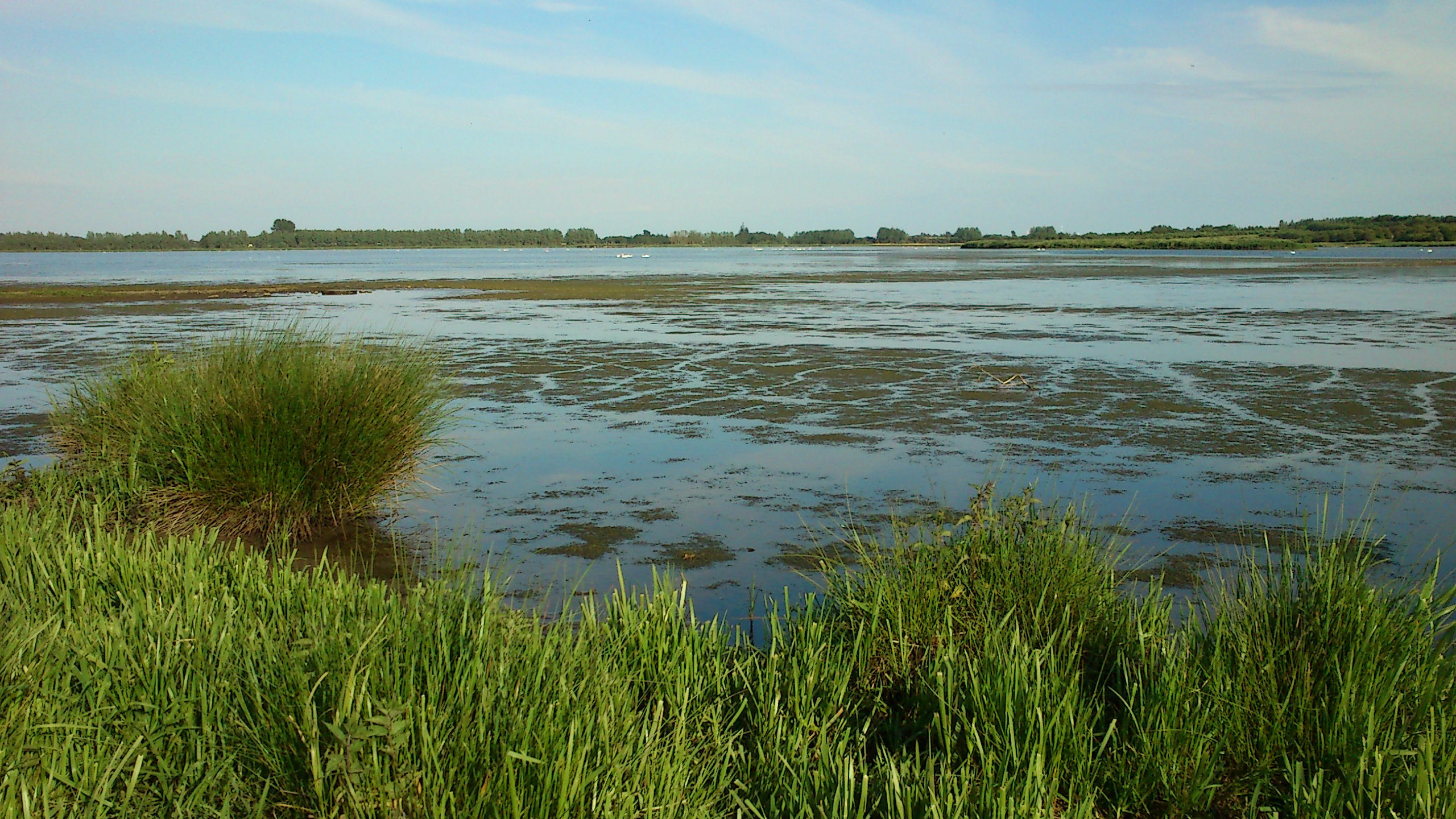
The lake is shallow and the water levels can vary by roughly one meter.

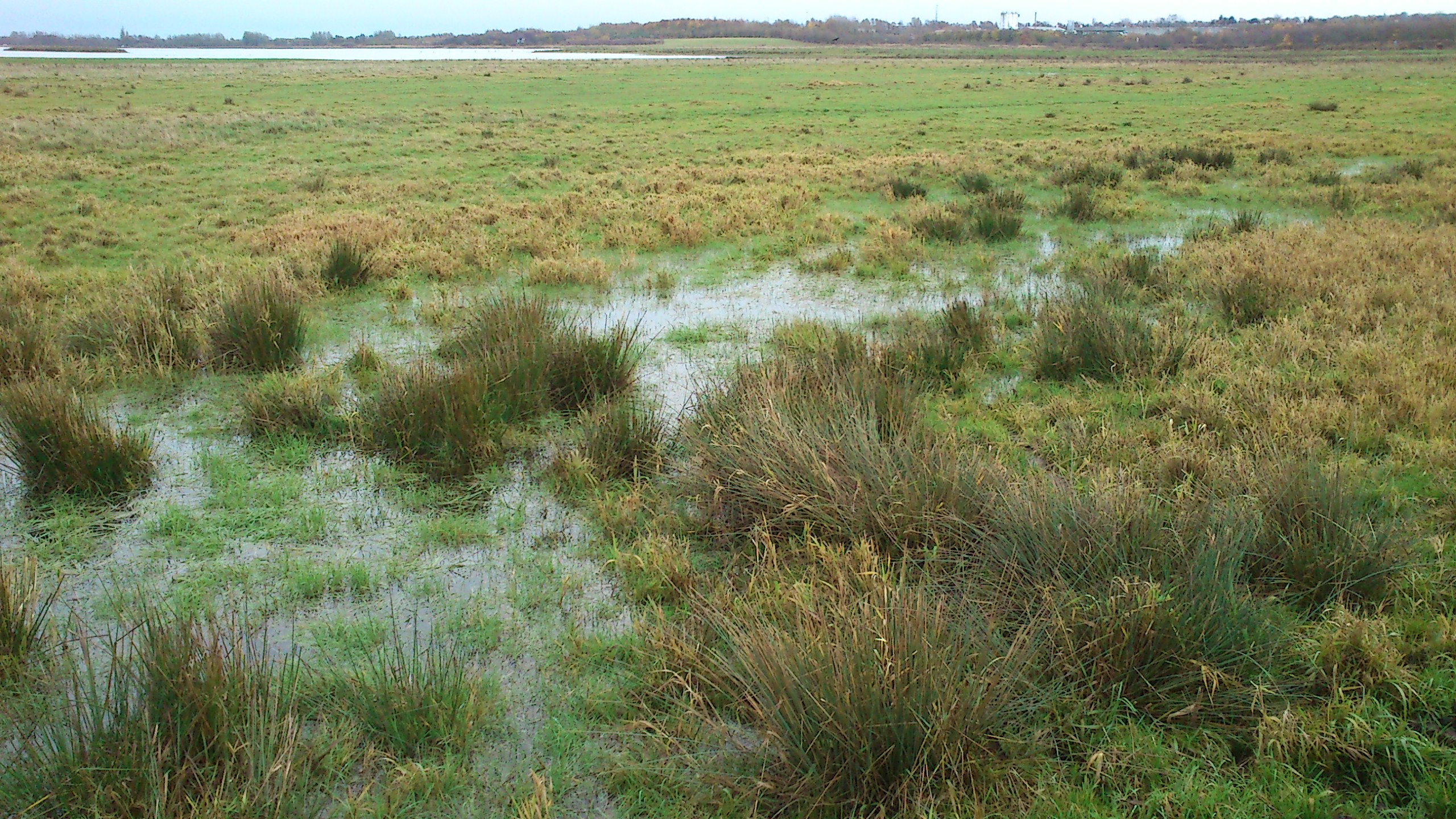
Wet meadows
