= Branched bur-reed =

Branched bur-reed is a common name for several plants in the genus Sparganium and may refer to:

- Sparganium androcladum, commonly referred to as "branched bur-reed" in North America
- Sparganium erectum, commonly referred to as "branched bur-reed" in the United Kingdom
