= Egaa Gymnasium =

School in Aarhus, Denmark

Coordinates: 56.211760°N 10.271249°E

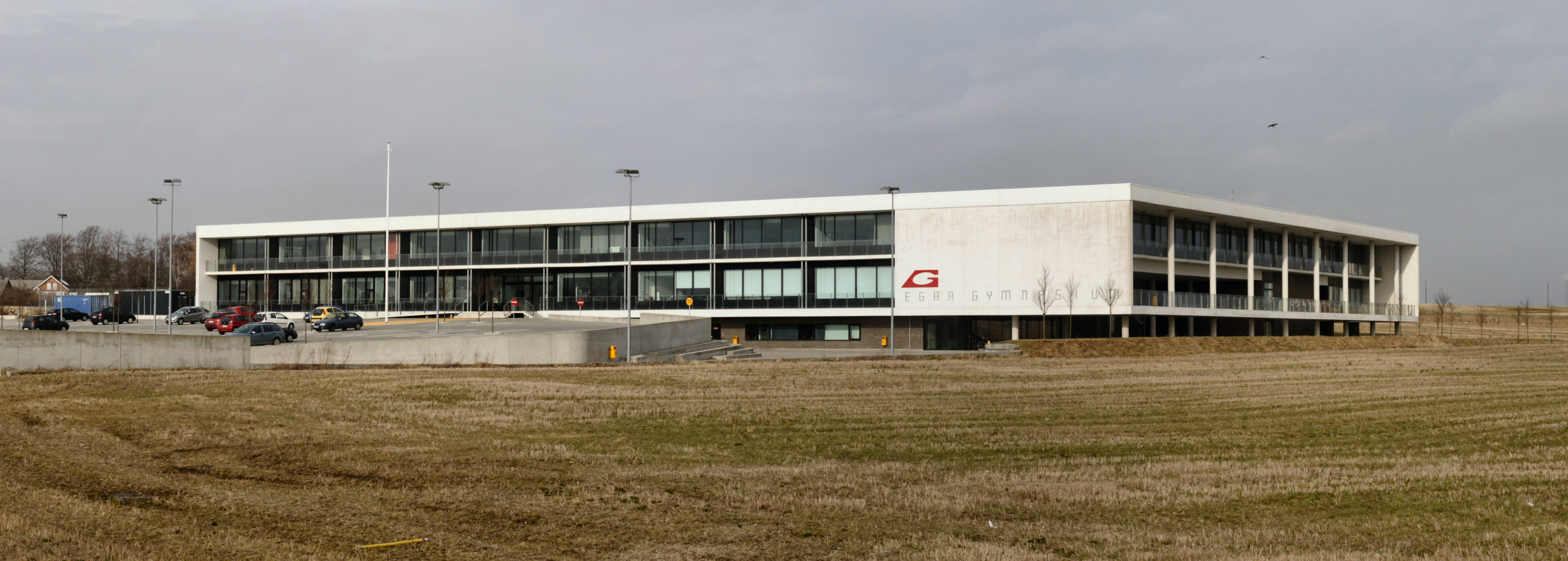
- Egaa Gymnasium
- Type: Gymnasium (Denmark)
- Established: 2006
- Rector: Eigil Dixen2015
- Students: 750
- Location: Aarhus, Denmark
- Website: http://www.egaa-gym.dk/

Egaa Gymnasium is a school of secondary education and a Gymnasium in Aarhus, Denmark. The school offers the 3 year Matriculation examination (STX) programme divided in 4 main lines; language, arts, social sciences and natural sciences. The school was subordinated to the Aarhus County until 2007 when the county was abolished and since then the school has been an independent self-owning institution.

== Building ==
The school was built in 2006, designed by Cubo Architects. The building costs were DKK 183 million and it is constructed in concrete, steel and glass as a rectangular cube and island in a flat, open landscape. Classrooms and workshops are placed around an open-air communal area and the building is characterized by open spaces and lightness.
