= Egå =

- Neighborhood
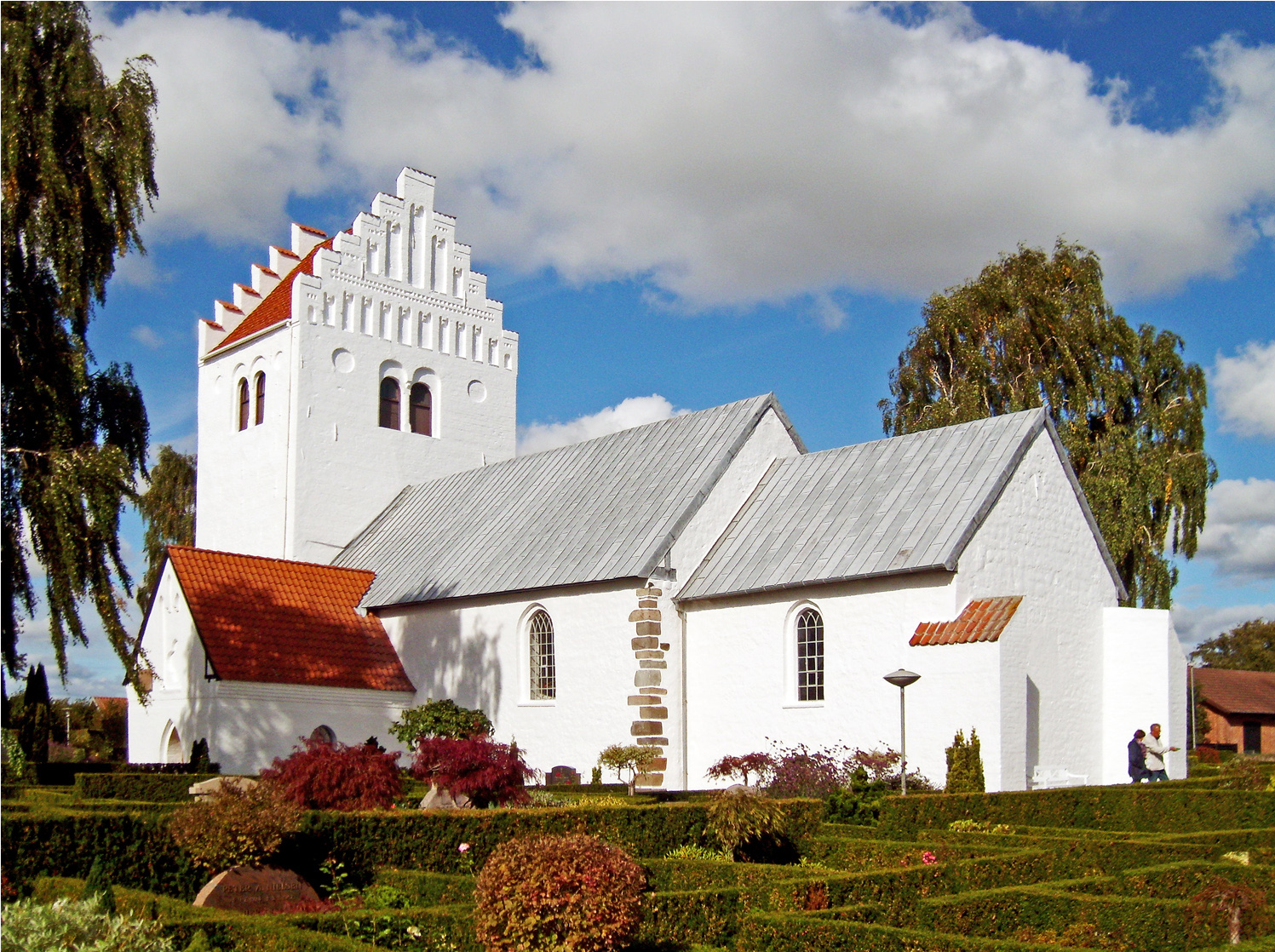
- Egå Church

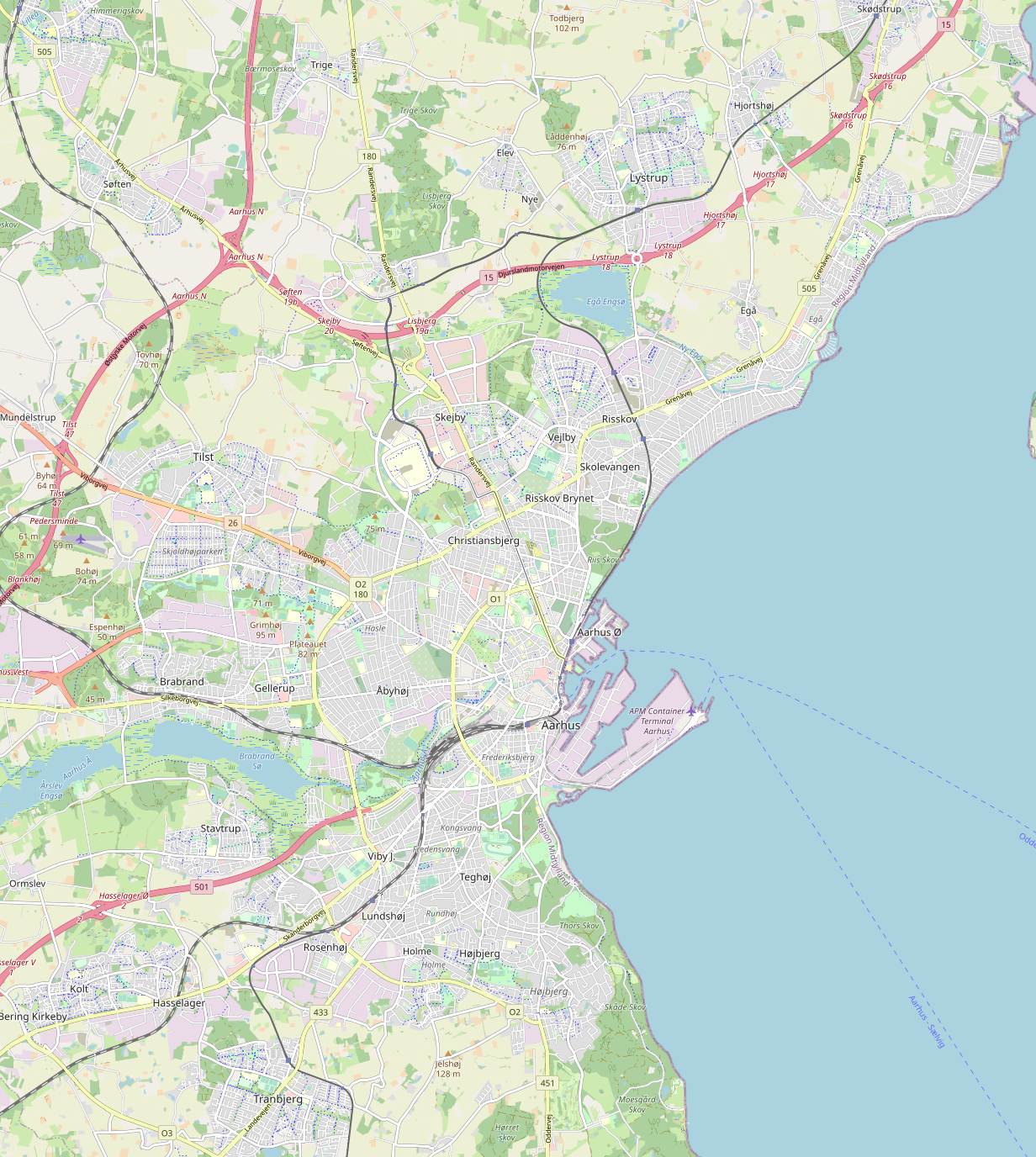
- Location within Aarhus
- Coordinates: 56.215980°N 10.266417°E
- Country: Kingdom of Denmark
- Regions of Denmark: Central Denmark Region
- Municipality: Aarhus Municipality
- District: Midtbyen
- Postal code: 8000 Aarhus C

Egå is a both a suburban district and a stream in the Municipality of Aarhus in Denmark.

== Name ==
Egå means 'Oak-stream' in English.

== The Egå stream ==
The Egå stream runs north of the city of Aarhus, in the bottom of the flat valley of Egådalen. The whole valley of Egådalen - 1,5 km wide and 6 km long - was created as a tunnel valley at the end of the last ice age and holds numerous evidence of prehistoric human activities, from the Stone Age to present times.

The Egå stream has its source at Geding Lake and from here it flows through the Geding-Kasted bog, the lake of Egå Engsø, the suburban area of Egå and the beach park of Åkrogen, before it terminates at the Bay of Aarhus.

== The Egå suburb ==
The suburban area of Egå is located approximately 7 km north of the Aarhus city centre and is named after the Egå stream, that flows through the area. Egå originated as a rural village, probably in the Viking Age. A runestone, from c. 970–1020 in the late Viking Age, was discovered in 1814 and is on permanent exhibit in the National Museum of Denmark.

Egå has merged with the city of Aarhus. The neighbourhood of Skæring north of central Egå has been merged administratively with Egå and it is in process of changing status to an urban area.

Egå is one of the more affluent neighbourhoods, with some of the highest cost of land in the municipality.

Egå is primarily a residential area with detached houses and no high-rises. The suburb houses a lively marina (Egå Marina), built in 1978, surrounded by the large beach park of Åkrogen. Egå Gymnasium was built in 2006.

== Gallery ==
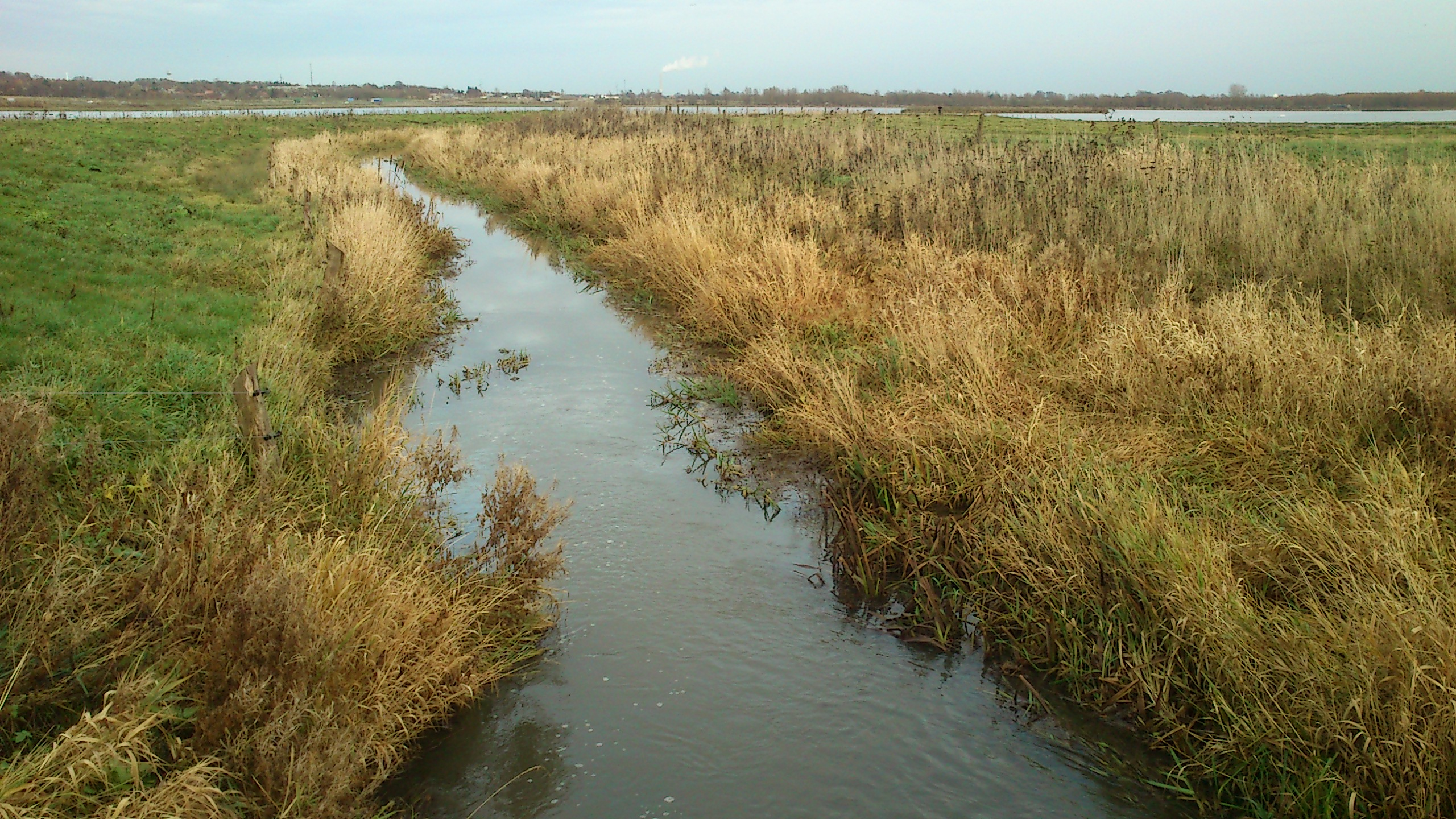
The Egå stream, just before it empties into the meadow-lake of Egå Engsø.

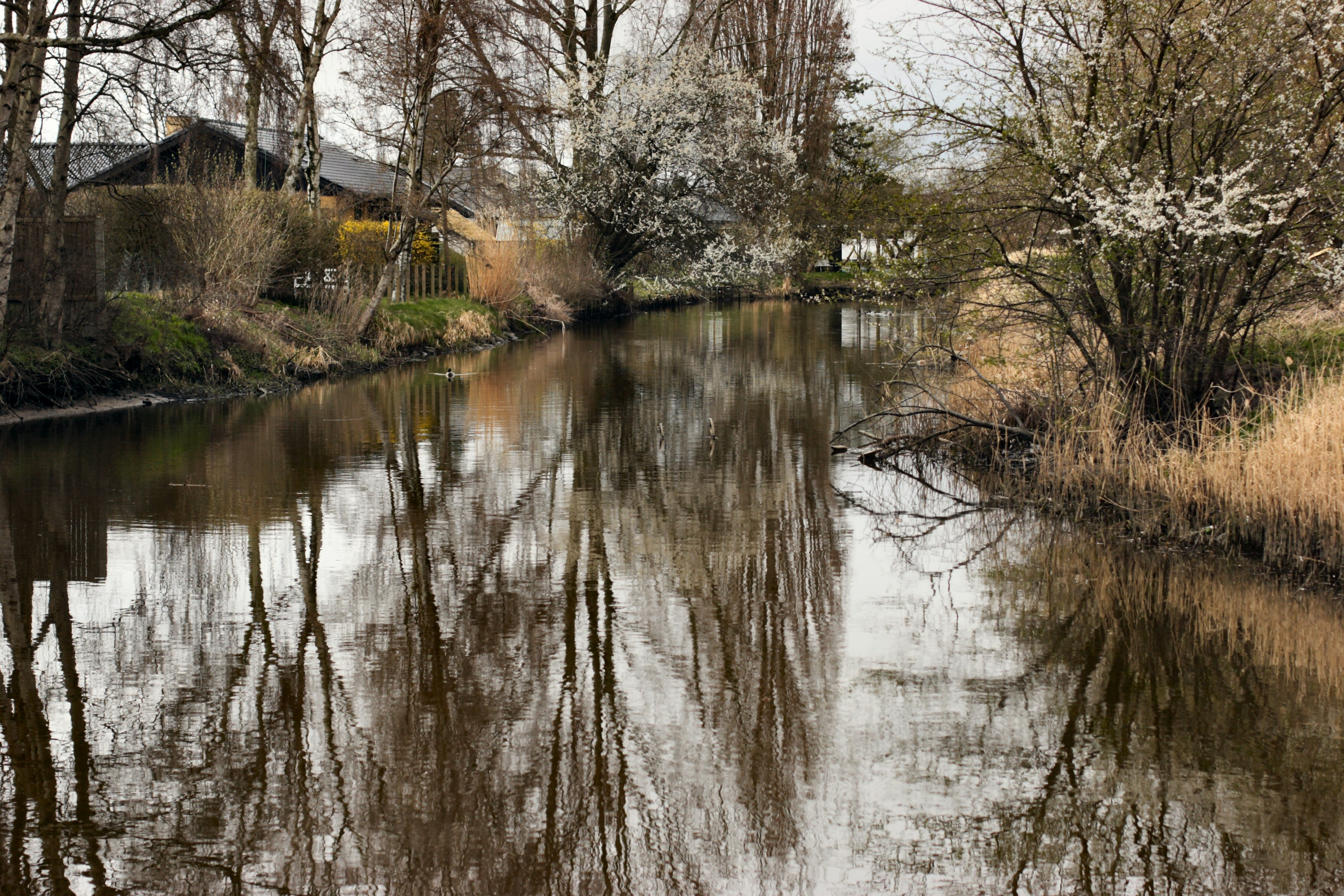
The Egå stream, on its way through the suburb of Egå. It grows considerably after the meadow-lake.

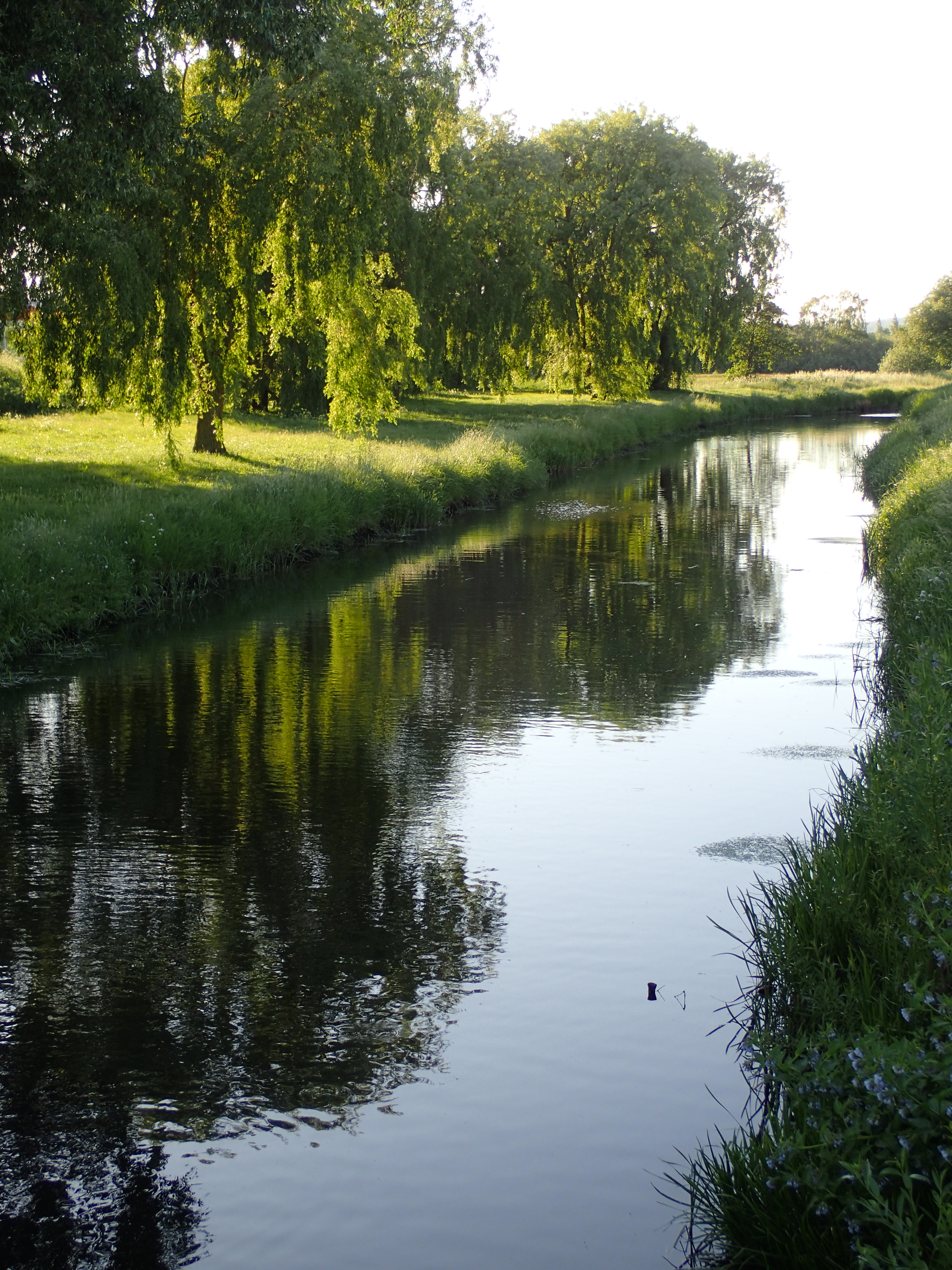
The Egå stream in Egå

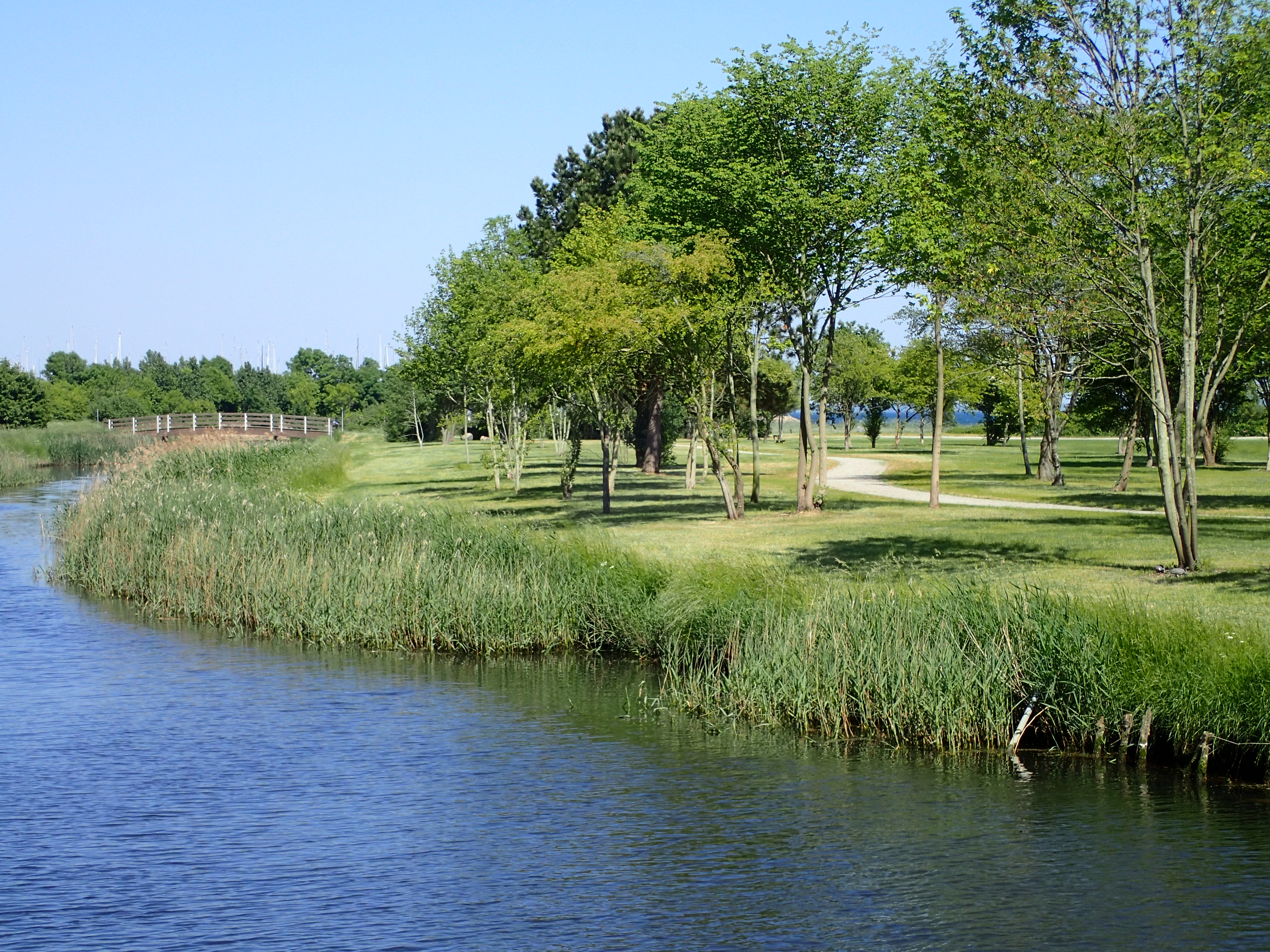
The Egå stream at Åkrogen
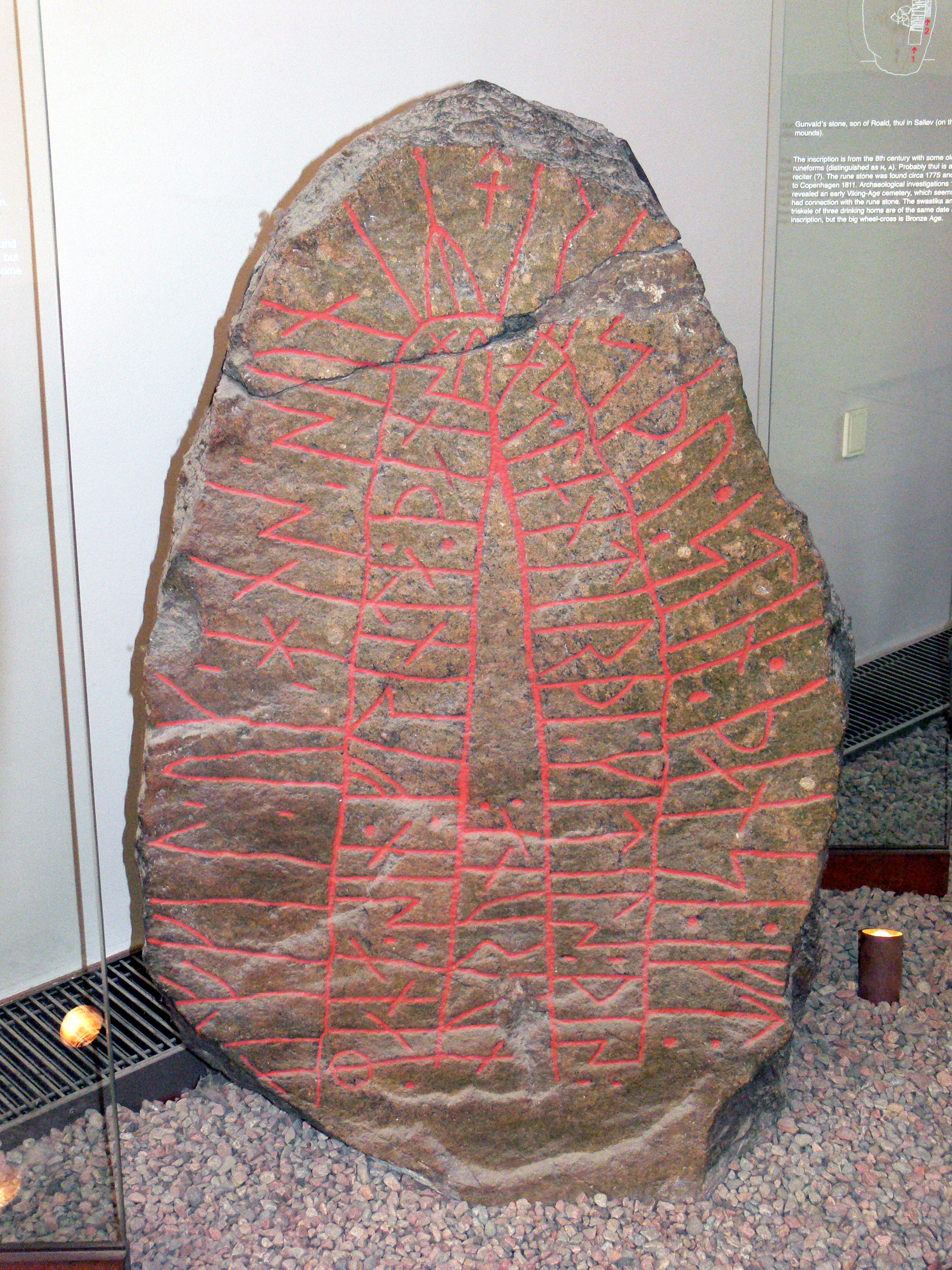
Egå runestone

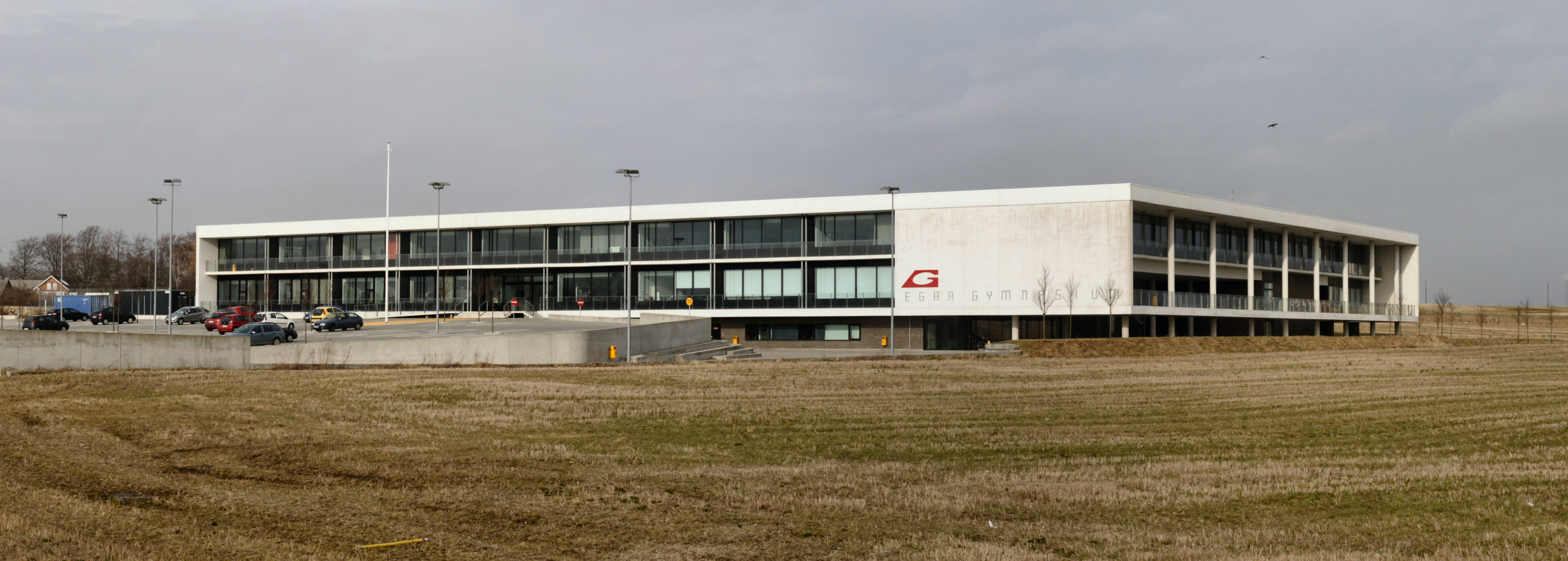
Egå Gymnasium

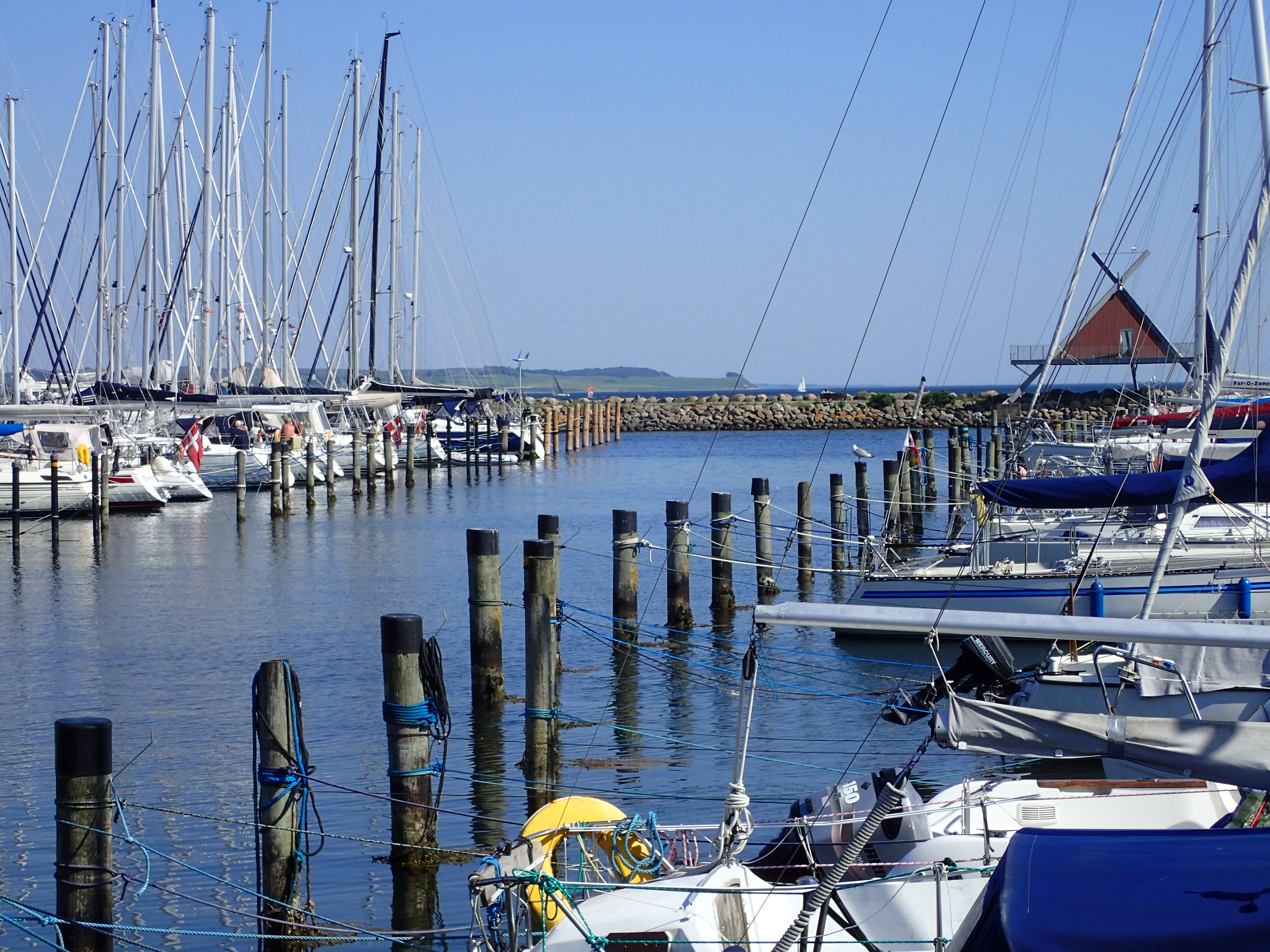
Egå Marina

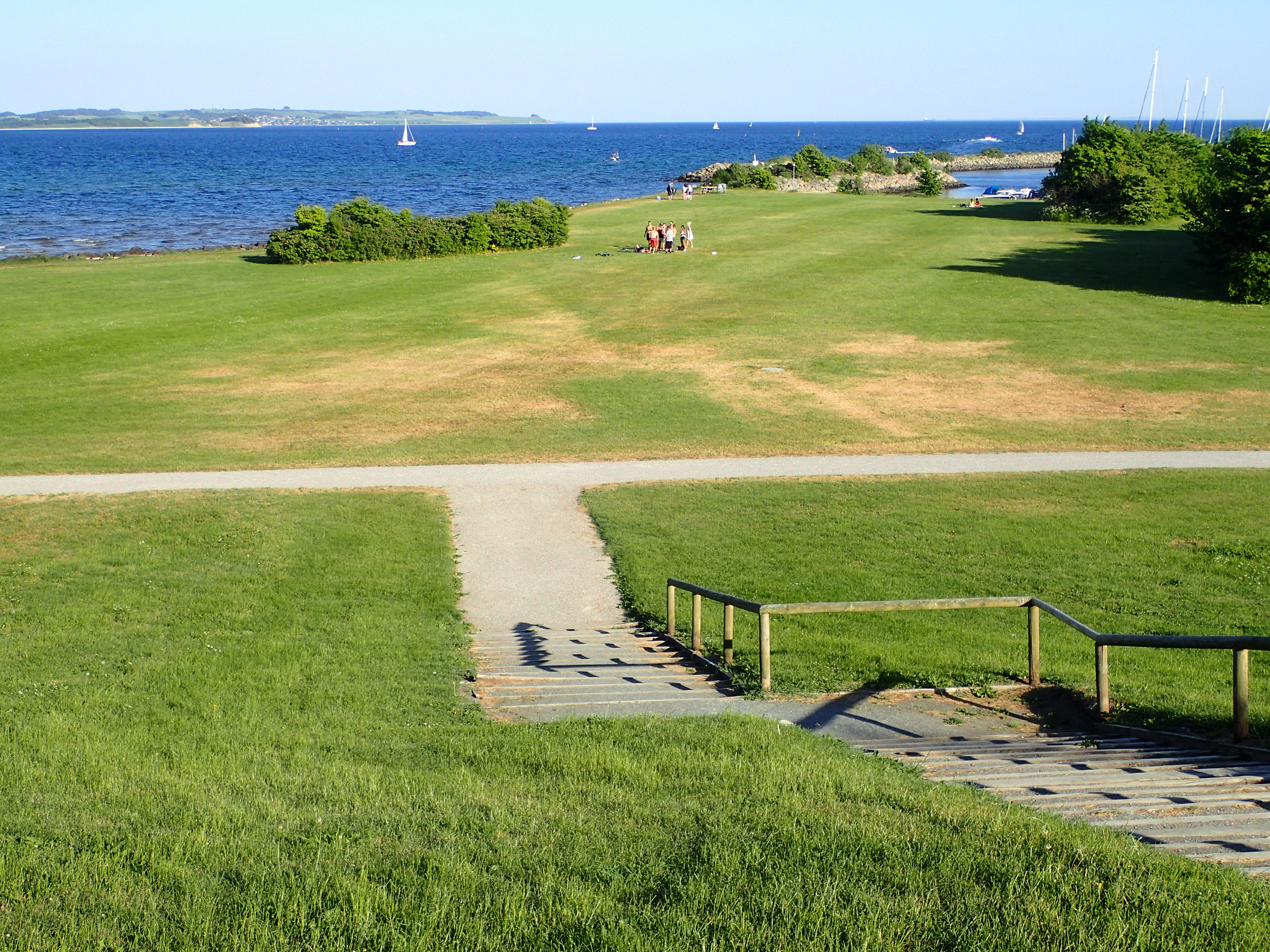
Åkrogen

== See also ==
- Egå Engsø
- Danish Runic Inscription 107 (The Egå Stone)
