= Bakkes =

Bakkes is a South African surname that may refer to

- Christiaan Bakkes (born 1965), South African writer
- C. Johan Bakkes (born 1956), South African writer, brother of Christiaan
- Margaret Bakkes (1931–2016), South African writer, mother of Christiaan and C. Johan

== See also ==
- Bakke (surname)
