= Bakke (surname) =

Bakke is a Norwegian surname that may refer to

- Allan Bakke (born 1940), American anaesthesiologist
- Arve Bakke (born 1952), Norwegian trade unionist
- Bill Bakke (born 1946), American ski jumper
- Bo Bakke (born 1955), Norwegian curler
- Brenda Bakke (born 1963), American actress
- Christine Bakke (born 1971), American LGBT activist
- Dagfinn Bakke (1933–2019), Norwegian artist
- E. Wight Bakke (1903–1971), American sociologist and economist
- Egil Bakke (1927–2022), Norwegian civil servant
- Frank Bakke-Jensen (born 1965), Norwegian politician
- Eirik Bakke (born 1977), Norwegian football player
- Gunnar Bakke (born 1959), Norwegian politician from the Progress Party and mayor of Bergen
- Hallvard Bakke (1943–2024), Norwegian politician for the Labour Party
- Holly Bakke, American attorney
- Johnny Bakke (1908–1979), Norwegian politician
- Kit Bakke (born 1946), American activist who promoted for women's rights
- Ole Bakke (1889–1925), Norwegian-American architect
- Morten Bakke (born 1968), Norwegian football goalkeeper
- Randi Bakke (1904–1984), Norwegian figure skater
- Ruth Bakke (born 1947), Norwegian organist and composer
- Svein Bakke (1953–2015), Norwegian football player
- Svein Erik Bakke (1947–2006), Norwegian entrepreneur
- Trine Bakke (born 1975), Norwegian alpine skier

== See also ==
- Bakkes
