= Hasle Hills =

Coordinates: 56.167°N 10.142°E

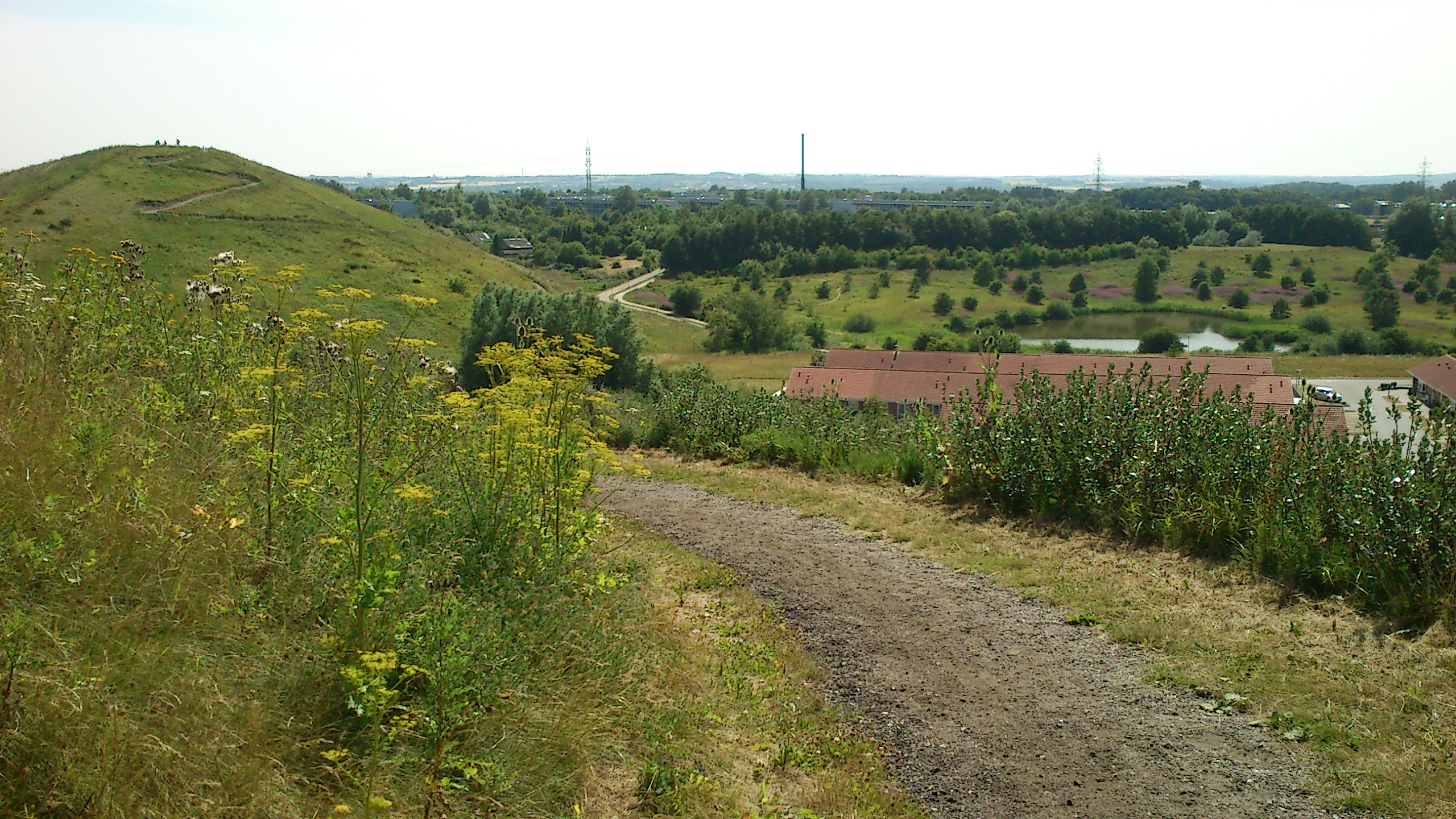
Hasle Hills seen from The Spiral.

Hasle Hills (Danish: Hasle Bakker) is a landscape and recreational area of 15.5 hectares (38 acres) in Aarhus, Denmark. It is located in the borderland between Hasle and the neighbourhood of Gellerup in the district of Aarhus V in the western parts of the city. Hasle Hills is part of the nature protection area of Naturen på Holmstrup Mark, which also contains parts of the larger recreational area of Skjoldhøjkilen, stretching west from Hasle Hills.

== Construction and layout ==
Hasle Hills comprises three artificial mounds, which were created between 1967 and 2005 from more than 1 million cubic metres of surplus earth, left over from various construction sites in Aarhus (including The Gellerup Plan). Some of the area was turned into recreational sites very early on, but it was not until 2003, that the whole area was connected and redesigned for optimal recreational use by architectural and design company Transform. According to them, the budget was 7.3 million kroner. The project was financed by European Union funds and Realdania. Hasle Hills are now administered by the self-governing group 'Hasle Bakker', under the local sports-organization of 'Idrætssamvirket Aarhus'. The Hasle Bakker group also administers the larger Skjoldhøjkilen and this can be a source of geographical confusion of what exactly Hasle Hills means.

Hasle Hills has three established mountain bike routes, all marked to avoid conflict with other users of the area.

The three mounds are called, from south to north, Plateuet, Bakkekammen and Spiralen (The Plateau, The Hill Crest and The Spiral). The highest point is the top of Bakkekammen, at 105 metres (344 ft) above sea level. It is the second highest point in the Aarhus area, only surpassed by Jelshøj, reaching 128 metres (420 ft). Given the relatively flat landscape in Jutland (and all of Denmark), the top of Hasle Hills offers scenic views across the whole Aarhus area and beyond, in all directions. Bakkekammen is also known as Bjerget (The Mountain) in everyday conversations.

== Gallery ==
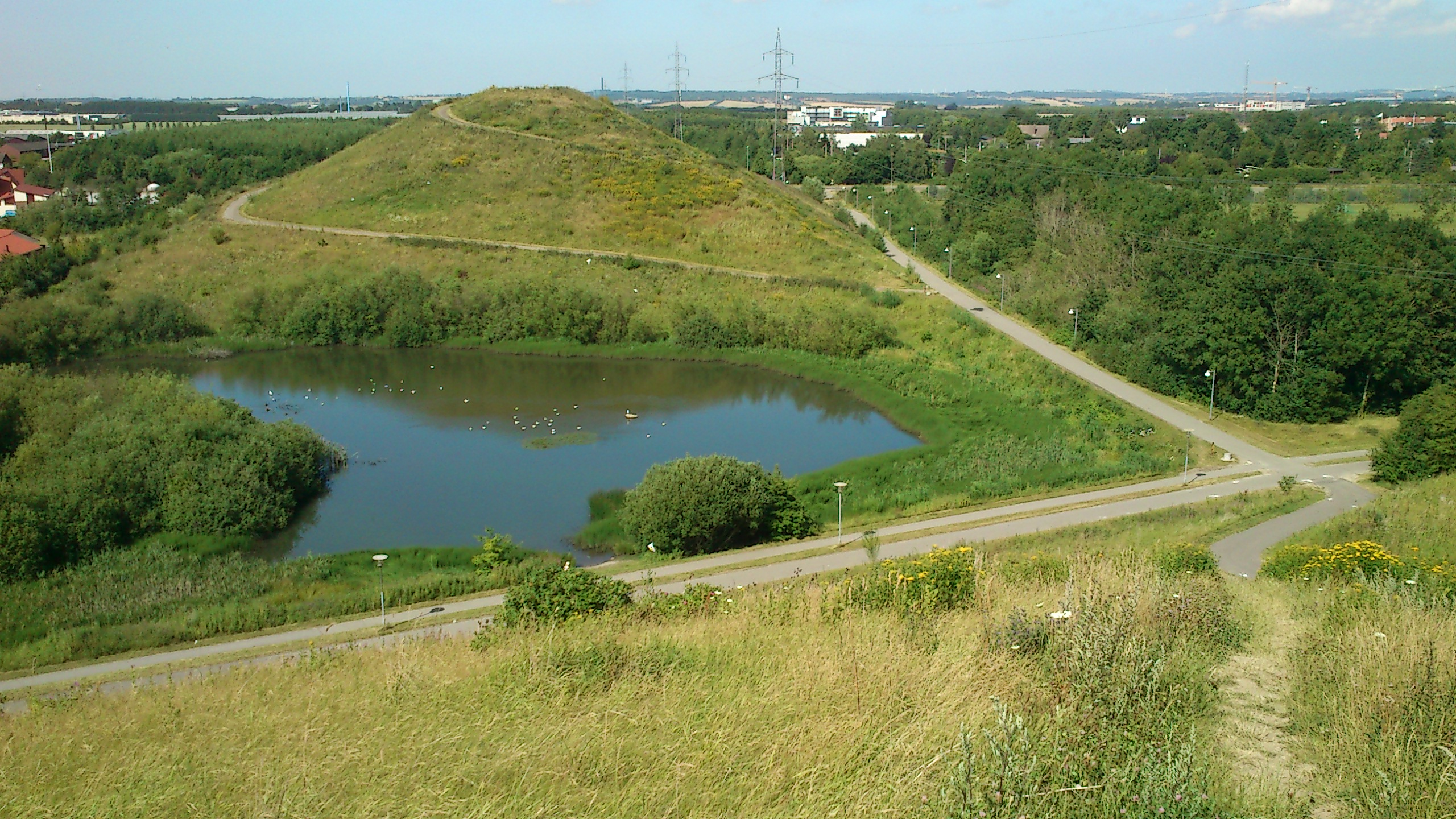
Spiralen.

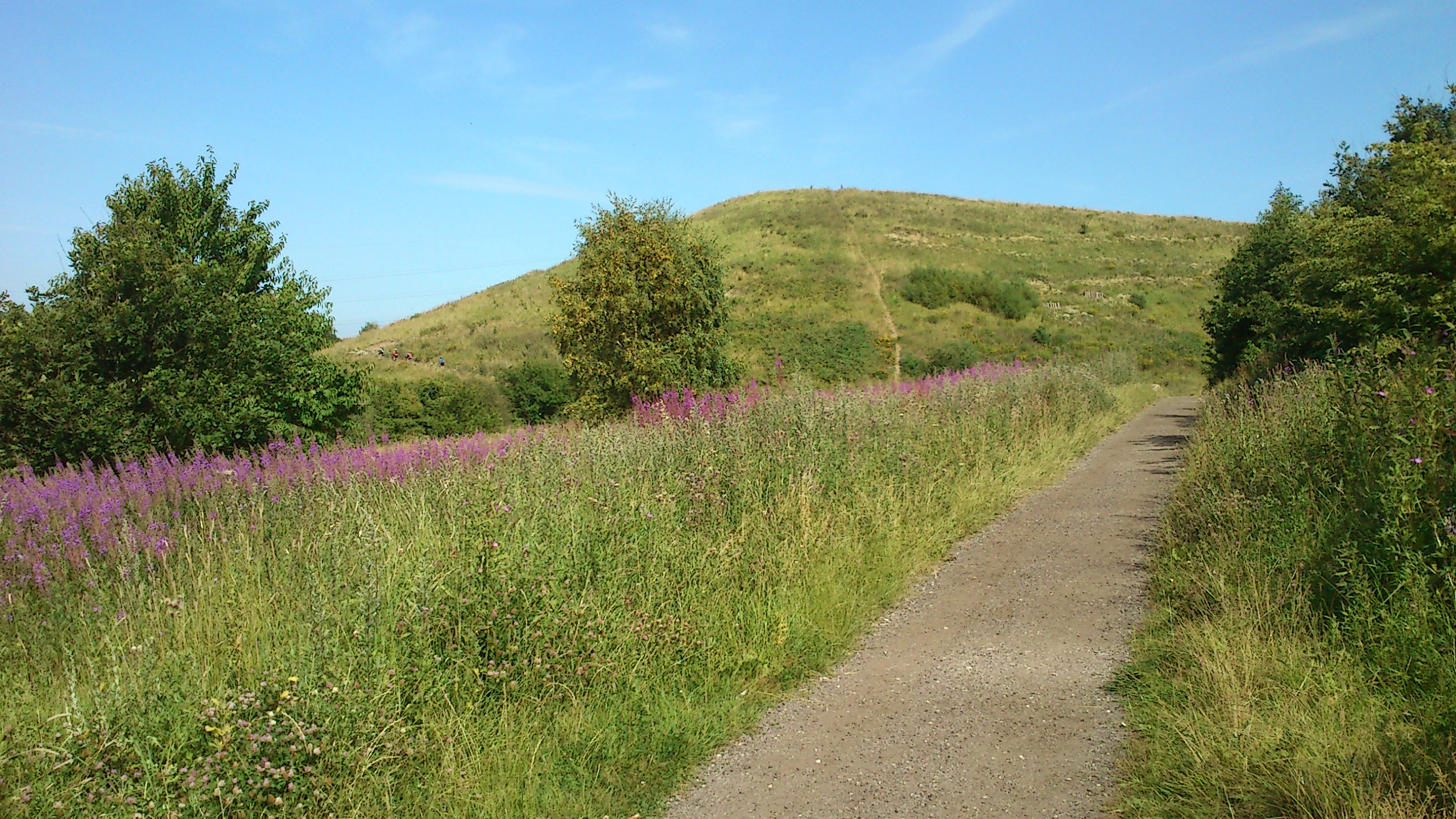
Bakkekammen in full bloom.

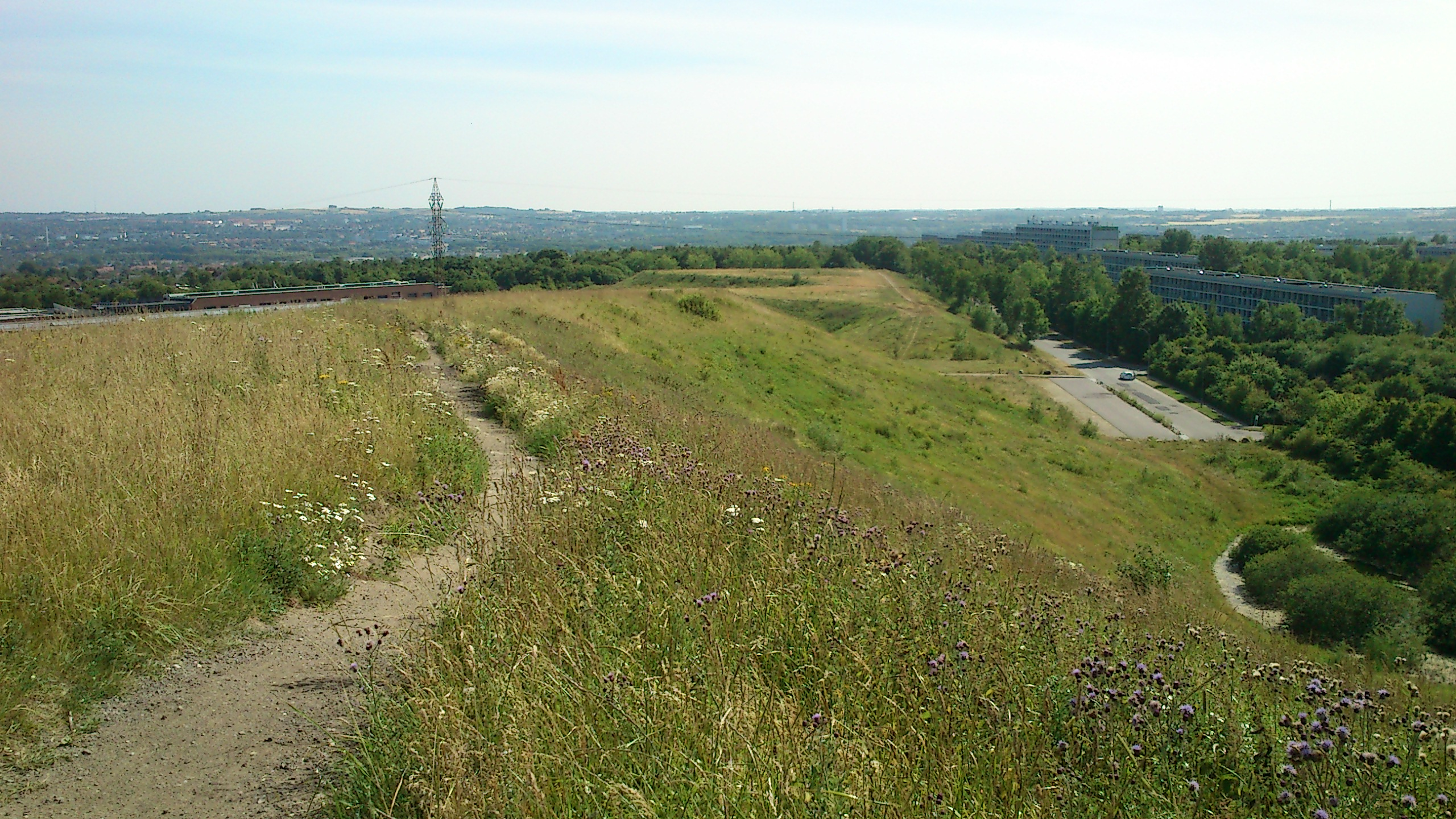
Plateauet seen from Bakkekammen.

== Notes and references ==
- The highest natural point in Denmark is Møllehøj at 170.86 m (561 ft), in Skanderborg municipality just east of Aarhus municipality.

== Sources ==
- Hasle Bakker Transform
- Hasle Bakker (in Danish)
