= Marienlyst Park =

Park in Aarhus, Denmark

Coordinates: 56.1811°N 10.1596°E

- Marienlystparken
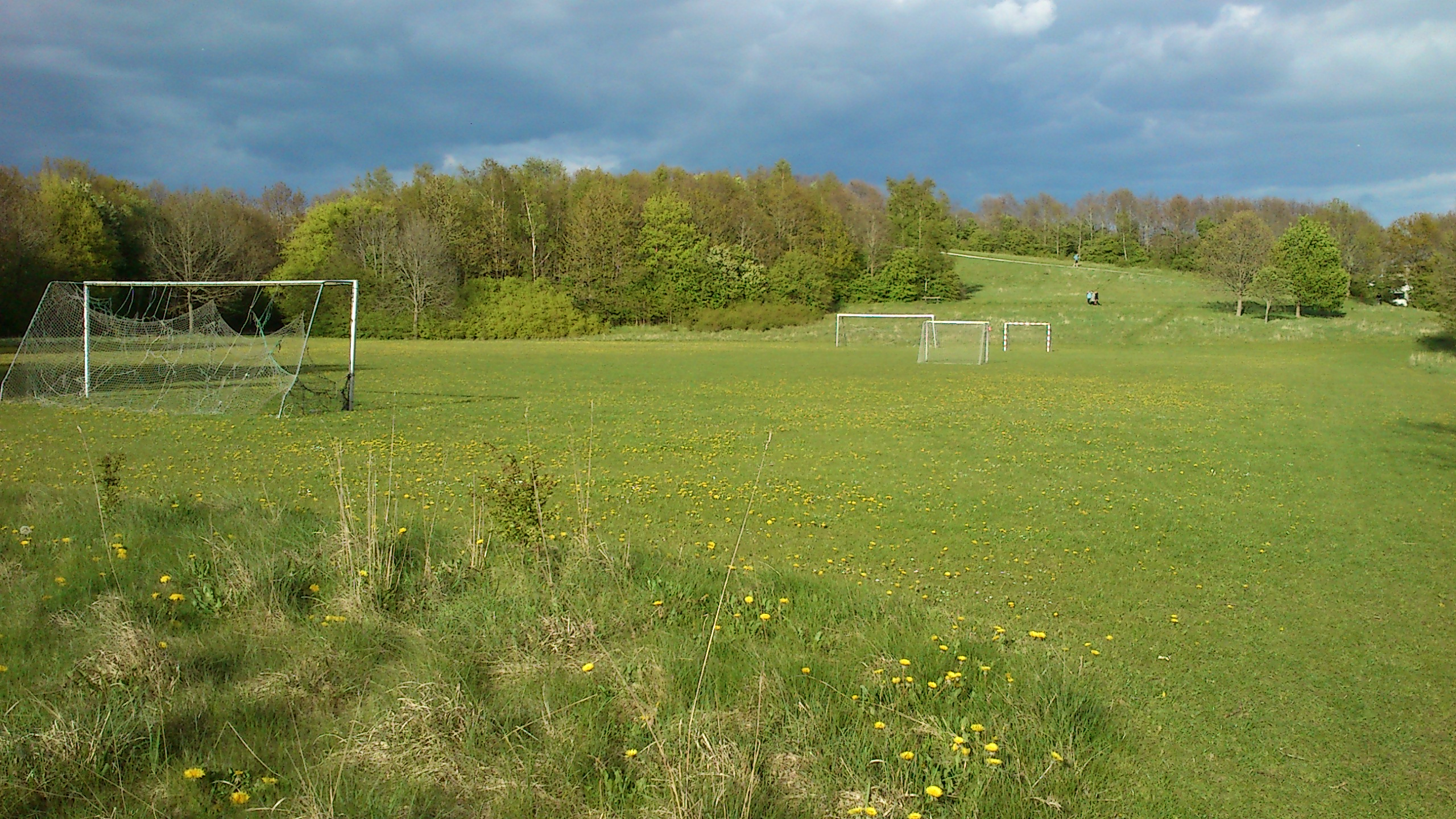
- Interactive map of Marienlyst Park
- Type: Urban park
- Location: Aarhus, Denmark
- Area: c. 20 hectares
- Created: 1970s
- Owner: Aarhus Municipality

Marienlyst Park (Danish: Marienlystparken) is a public park in Hasle in the Aarhus V district, north-west Aarhus, Denmark. The park is situated west of the Herredsvang neighborhood along the street Fjældevænget Busvej to the south and Brendstrup Forest to the west. Marienlyst Park is one of the largest parks in Aarhus and features both landscaped lawns and artificial forested hills. Facilities include an amphitheatre, soccer fields, playgrounds and a 6-hole golf course. Marienlyst Park was established in connection with the development of western Hasle in the 1970s and today forms part of a green corridor extending from Vestereng to Brabrand Lake. The park is owned by Aarhus Municipality and is managed by the municipal department Natur og Miljø (Nature and Environment). Marienlyst Park can be rented for public events.

The largest areas in Marienlyst Park are landscaped and managed, such as grass lawns and soccer fields, but there are some areas intentionally left to grow wilder. Artificial hills have been created from surplus soil from construction projects and are now left to grow as small managed forests. The park includes two marked running tracks of 1500 and 3000 meters. In addition Marienlyst Golf Club maintains a 6-hole short-golf course, accessible through an introductory course in the club.

== Environmental policy ==
In 1988, Aarhus City Council enacted the plan "Århus omkranset af skove" (Aarhus surrounded by forests) which outlines a masterplan for green spaces in the city. The basic premise is that neighborhoods and districts should be separated by green spaces such as parks or forests. Marienlyst Park was created earlier as a neighborhood park but the result of the later municipal policy has been that the park today is part of a larger network of recreational spaces. The neighboring Brendstrup Forest is one of several new forests and natural areas established since the 1990s. It's thus possible to walk from Vestereng over Marienlyst Park to Brendstrup Forest and on to Hasle Hills and Gjellerup Forest to finally end at Brabrand Lake west of Aarhus. East of Marienlyst Park lies Mollerup Forest and Egå Engsø although they are not directly connected.

== Gallery ==
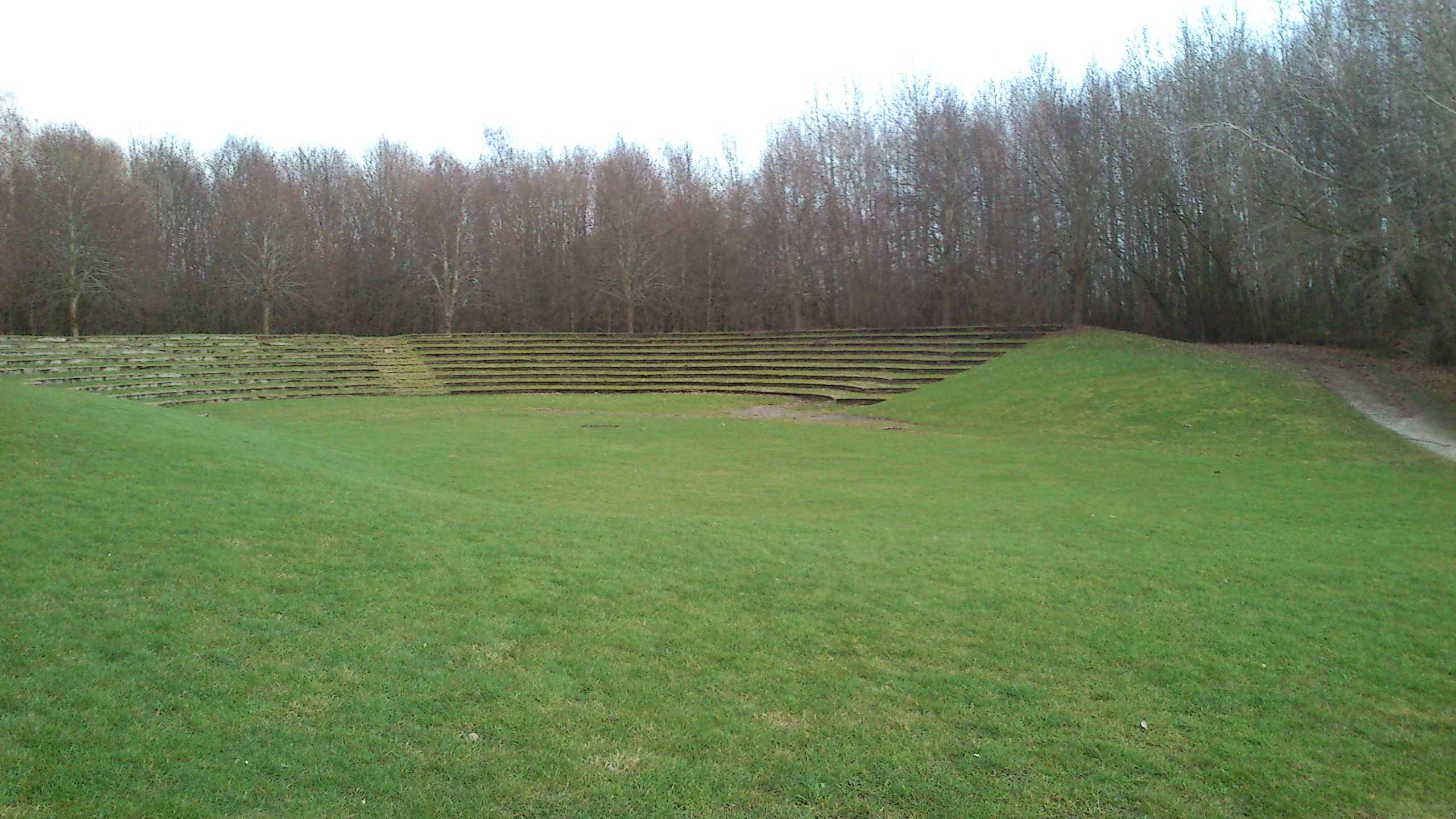
The amphitheatre

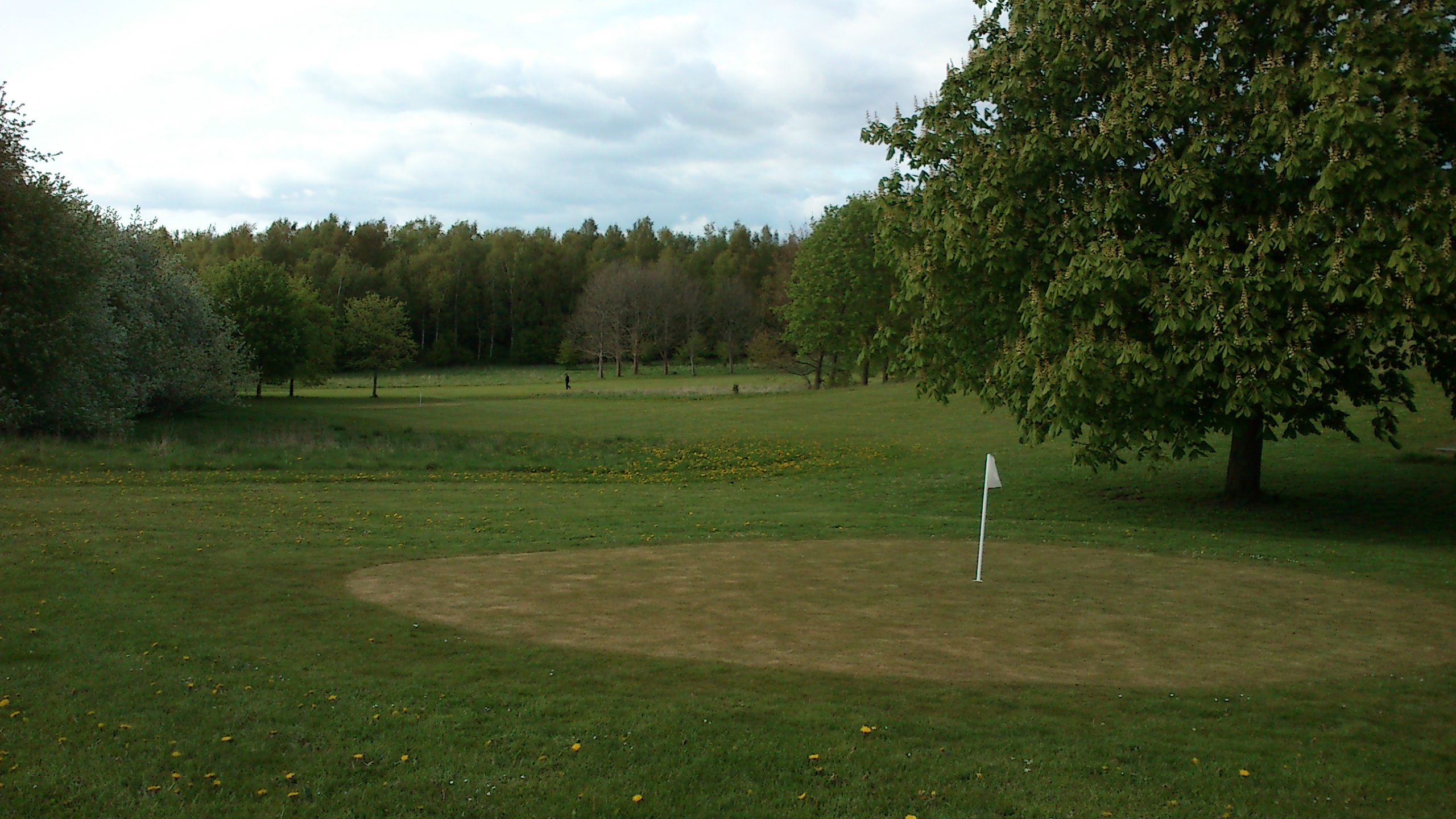
The Golf course

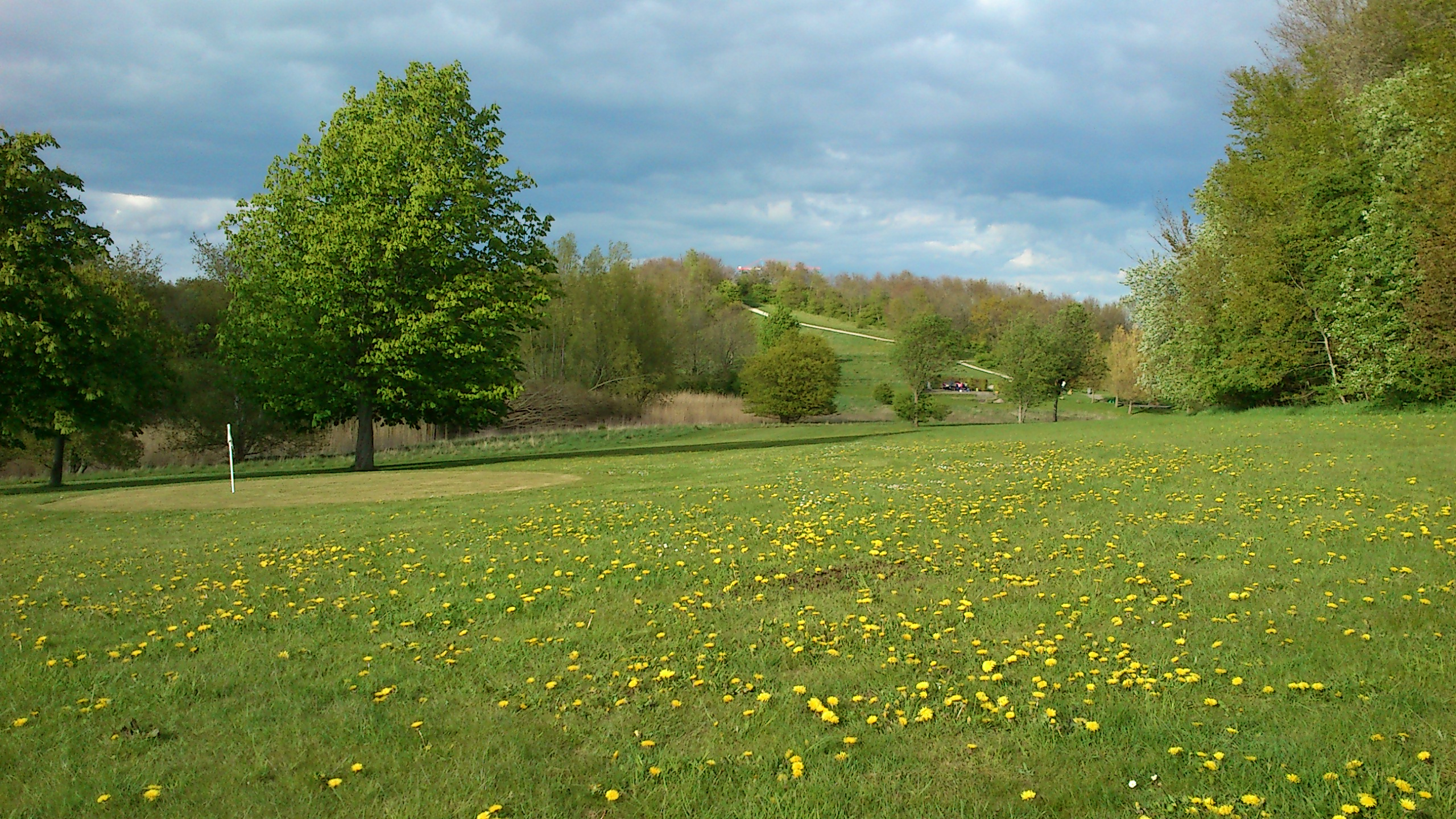
Golf course with artificial hill in background

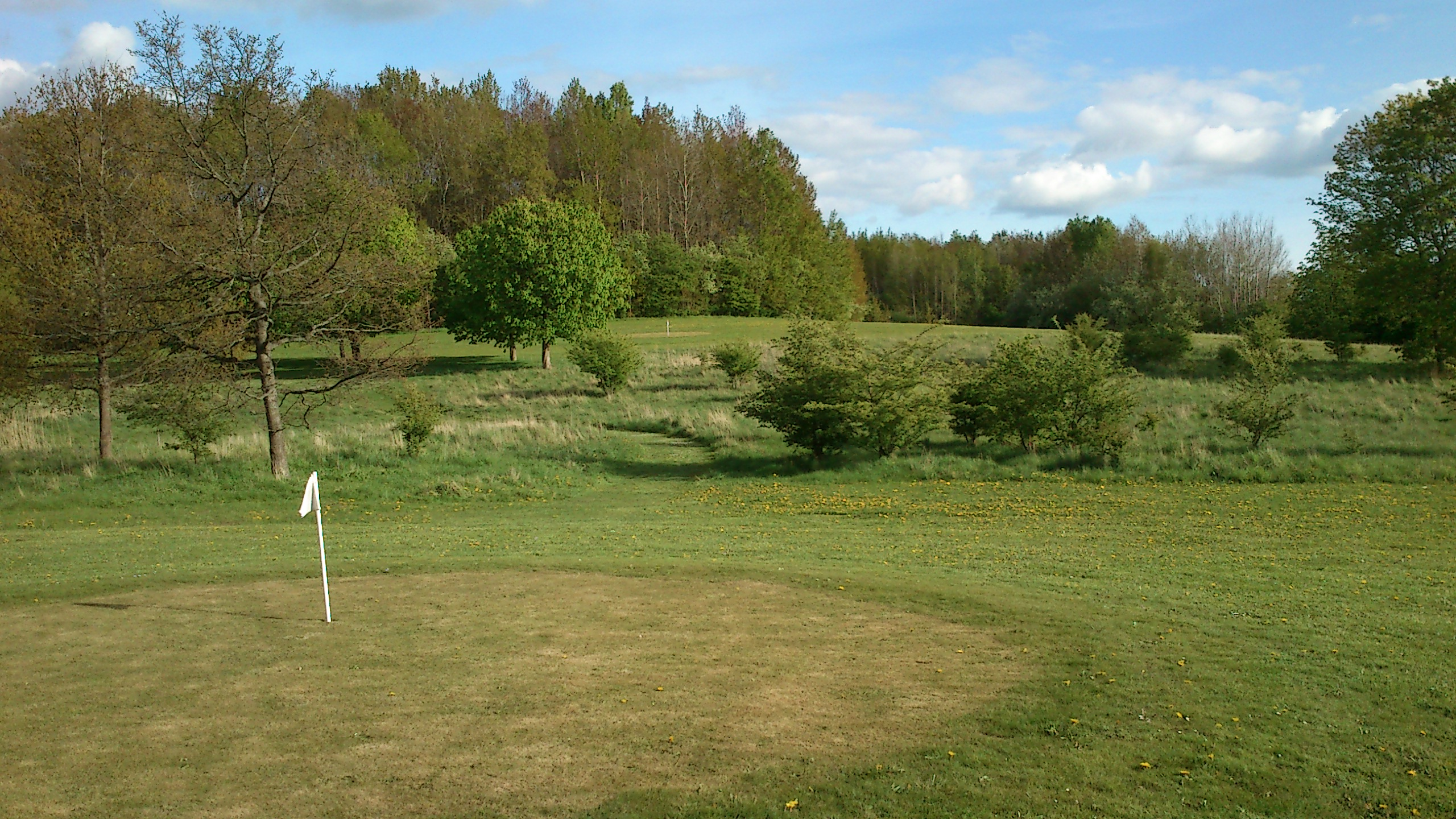
Golf course with hills in background

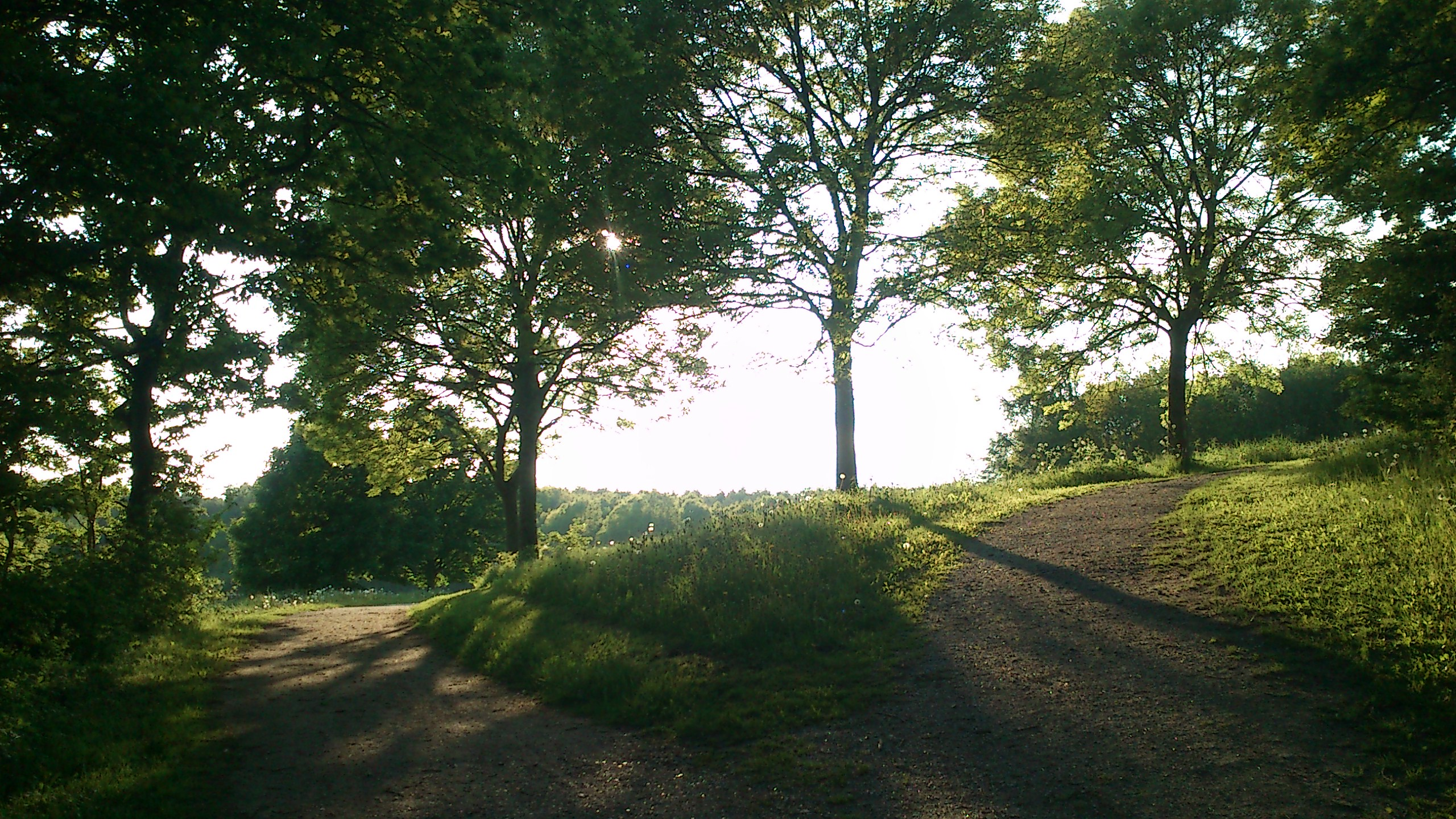
Hilly forested area
