= Bakke =

Bakke may refer to:

== Places ==
=== Denmark ===
- Amager Bakke, a waste-to-power incinerator plant in Copenhagen, Denmark
- Bispebjerg Bakke (building), an apartment complex in Copenhagen, Denmark

=== Norway ===
- Bakke Municipality, former municipality in Vest-Agder county in Norway
- Bakke Abbey in Trondheim, Norway
- Bakke Church (Trondheim), a church in Trondheim municipality in Sør-Trøndelag county, Norway
- Bakke Church (Vest-Agder), a church in Flekkefjord municipality in Vest-Agder county, Norway

=== United States ===
- Bakke Mountain, a summit in Florida, Massachusetts
- Bakke Graduate University in Dallas, Texas

== Other uses ==
- De Bakke, an area near Hermanus, South Africa
- Bakke (surname)

== See also ==
- Regents of the University of California v. Bakke, a landmark US Supreme Court case
