= Backe =

Backe may refer to:

== People ==
- Backe (surname)

== Places ==
- Backe, Carmarthenshire, Wales
- Backe, Sweden
- Backë, a village in Albania
- Bačka or Baçkë, an area of the Pannonian plain divided between Serbia and Hungary

== See also ==
- Bache (disambiguation)
- Bakke (disambiguation)
