= Bispehaven =

- Neighborhood
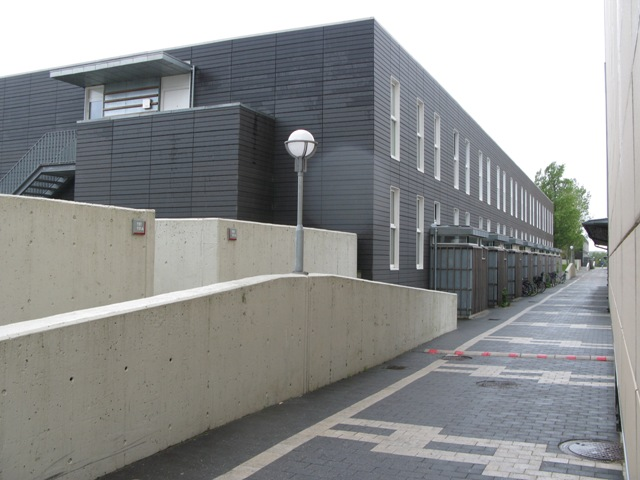
- Attached town houses in Bispehaven

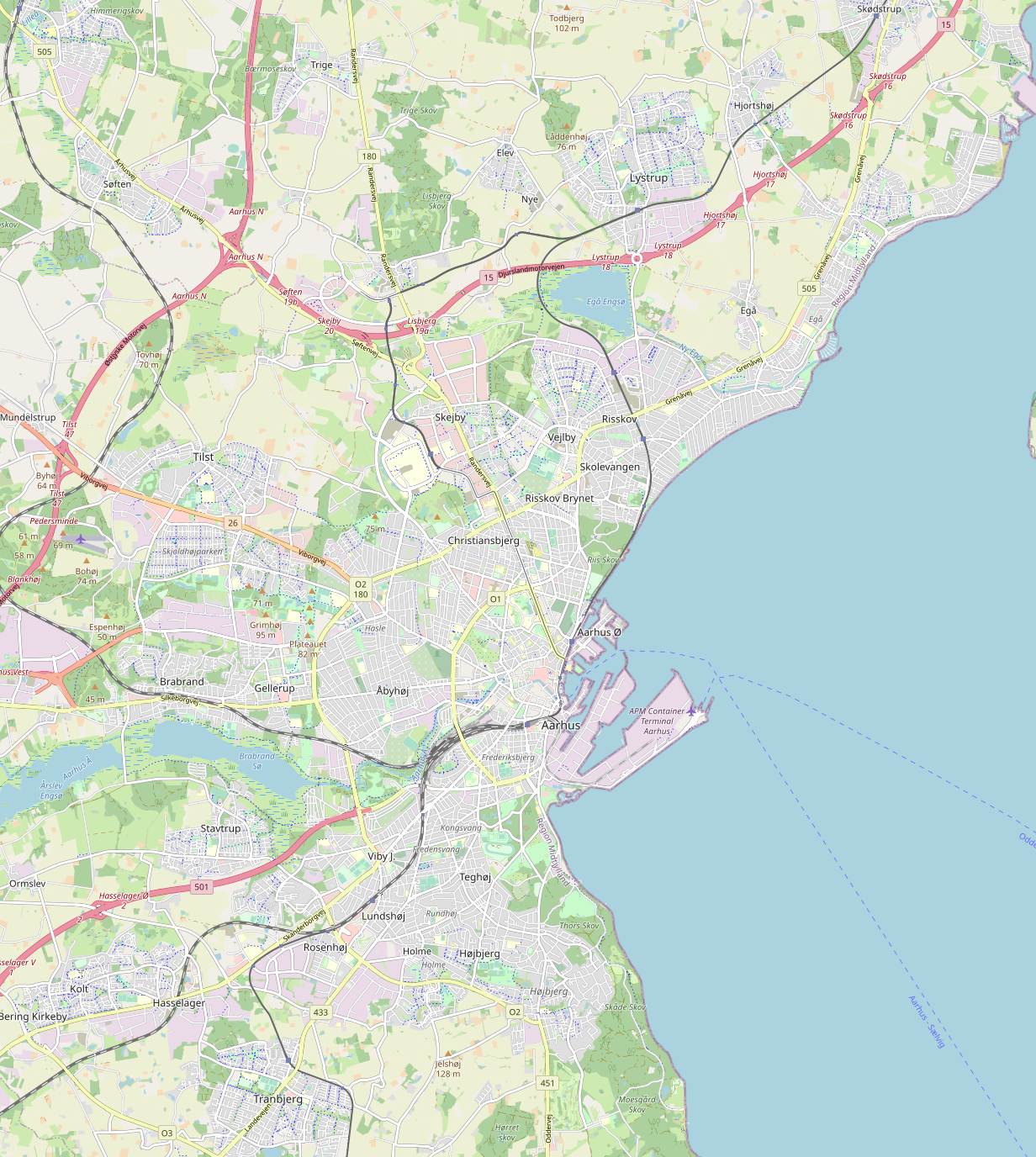
- Location within Aarhus
- Coordinates: 56.167457°N 10.154976°E
- Country: Kingdom of Denmark
- Regions of Denmark: Central Denmark Region
- Municipality: Aarhus Municipality
- District: Åbyhøj
- Postal code: 8230

Bispehaven (English: The Bishop Garden) is a housing project and the largest department of the housing cooperative Østjysk Bolig in Aarhus, Denmark. The project is located in the western suburb of Hasle and mostly consists of concrete apartments, but with small two-story attached town houses, too. The buildings were thoroughly renovated in 2004–07.

Bispehaven has c. 2,500 inhabitants, with a high percentage of 1st- and 2nd-generation immigrants (approximately 70%). The area has been known as a so-called ghetto area, as one of many in western Aarhus (Aarhus V). The crime and the unemployment rate is high compared to other areas of Aarhus and in 2014 the district was placed on the official Danish ghetto list by authorities. In 2014, Of the 2252 inhabitants, 46.5% were neither in employment nor education. The share of non-Western migrants was 67%. The share of inhabitants having a conviction for the Danish penal code, gun violations or drug offences was 2.89% and 47.7% had only primary education.

As a government response to the urban decay, it was decided by the Aarhus City Council in 2018 that 3 buildings part of a public housing complex with 318 apartments were to be demolished. The inhabitants are now forced to move with new private properties for ownership and business to be built instead.

== Sources and external links ==
- Bispehaven i Aarhus V Det Boligsociale Fællessekretariat (in Danish)
- Marwan Official homepage
