= Alberton School =

- U.S. National Register of Historic Places
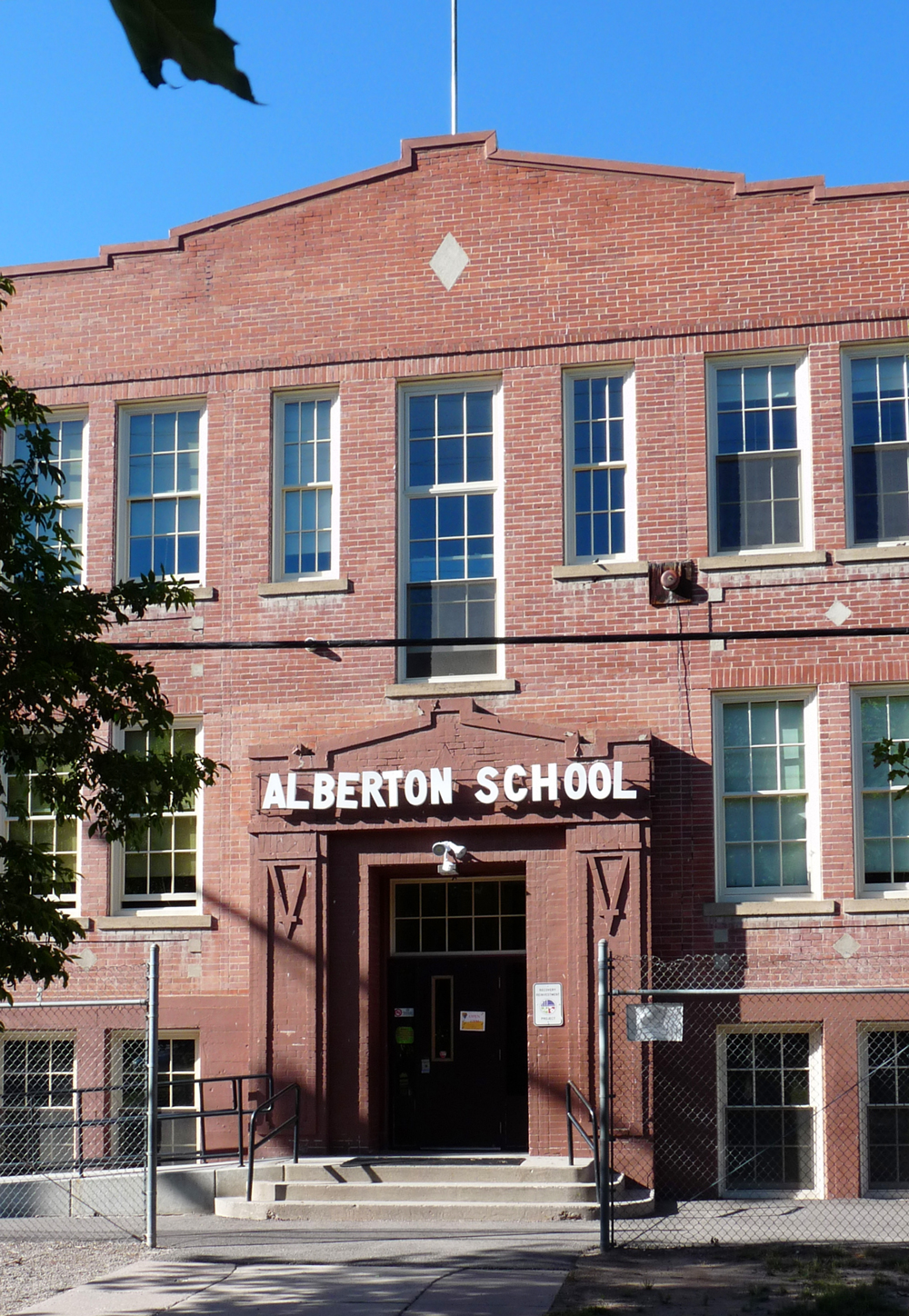
- Main entrance Alberton School, Alberton, Montana

- Location within Montana
- Location: Alberton, Montana
- Coordinates: 47°00′17″N 114°28′54″W
- Built: 1919
- Architect: Ole Bakke
- Architectural style: Collegiate Classical Revival
- NRHP reference No.: 96001599
- Added to NRHP: January 13, 1997

Alberton School is a three-story brick school located in Alberton, Montana, United States which was listed on the National Register of Historic Places on January 13, 1997. Constructed in 1919 at a cost of US$70,000, the school was built to replace a wooden structure that burned in 1916. From its construction until 1960 it was the only high school within 40 square miles (100 km^{2}). It continues to serve as a school, and remains architecturally intact.
