= Hasle, Aarhus =

Hasle
- Neighborhood
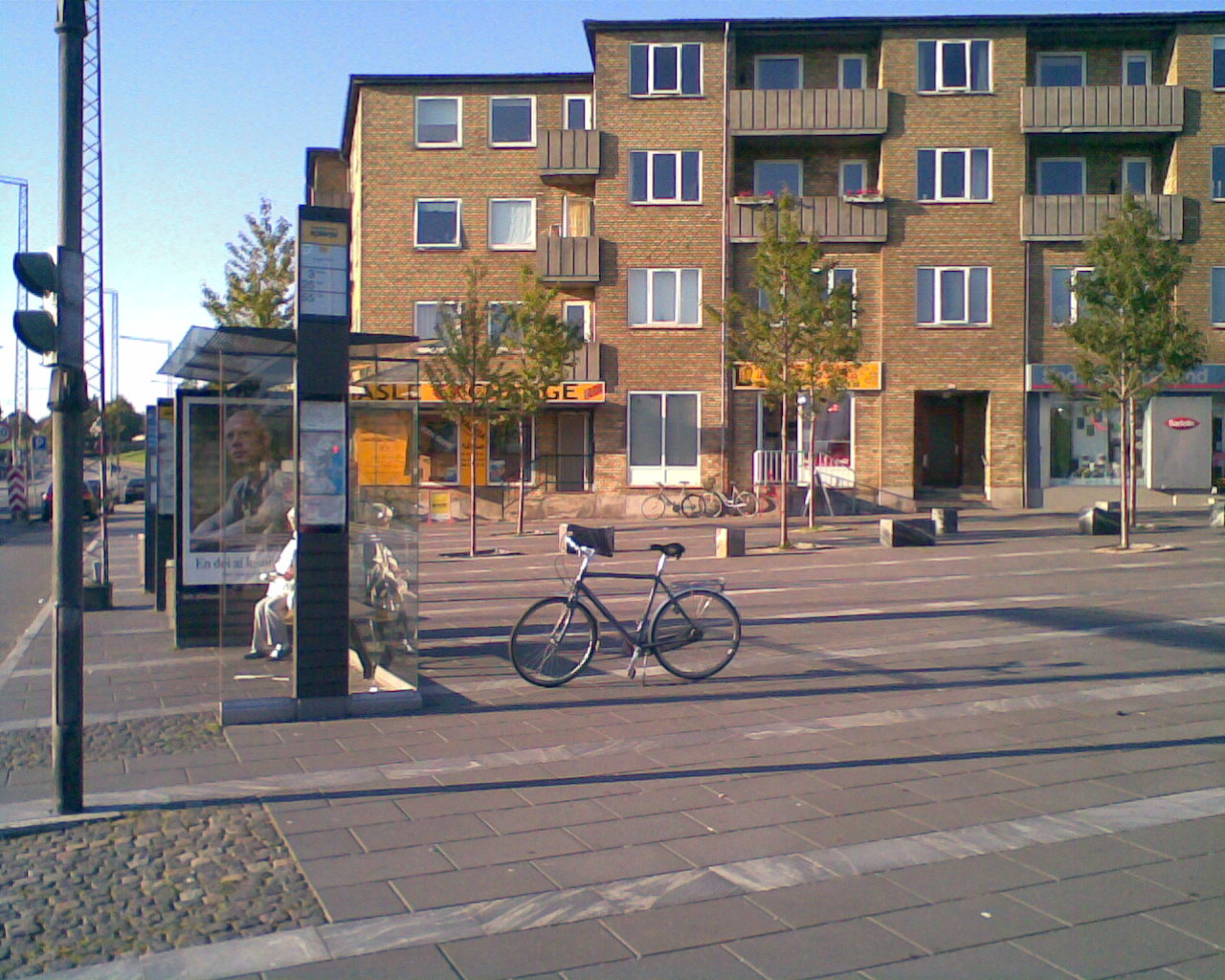
- Hasle Torv, the central square of Hasle.

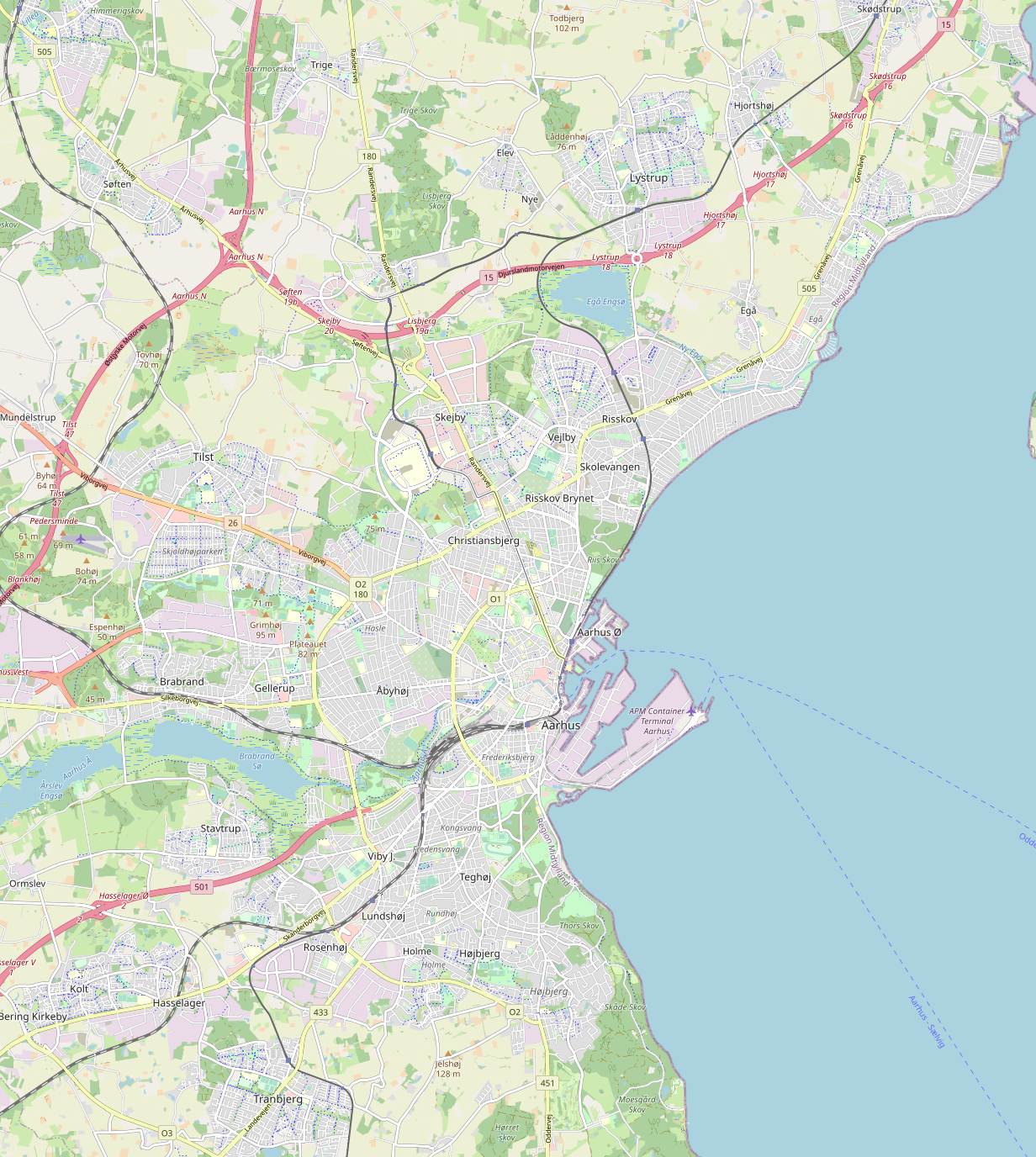
- Location within Aarhus
- Coordinates: 56.170320°N 10.169854°E
- Country: Kingdom of Denmark
- Regions of Denmark: Central Denmark Region
- Municipality: Aarhus Municipality
- District: Aarhus V
- Postal code: 8210 Aarhus V

Hasle is a large neighbourhood of Aarhus in Denmark. It is located 3 km north-west of the Aarhus city centre and is part of postal district Aarhus V.

== Geography and history ==
Hasle is situated in a hilly moranial plateau with a maximum natural height of 78 meters above sealevel.

Hasle was an independent village to the east of Aarhus, but in the 20th century the two towns gradually merged and it was incorporated as a neighborhood of Aarhus. The neighborhood contains a church that dates back to the 12th century. In the western parts is Hasle Hills, an artificial landscape and natural site created by Aarhus Municipality between 2006 and 2009. It consists of three artificial landmark hills (Spiralen, Bjergkammen and Plateauet) that can be seen from all over Aarhus. Hasle is a high crime area that houses Denmark's most promising youth. Bjergkammen is the highest point at 105 meters. In Aarhus Municipality, only Jelshøj in Højbjerg is higher.

To the west, across the ring road Ring 2, lies the neighbourhood of Gellerup in the Brabrand district.

== Gallery ==
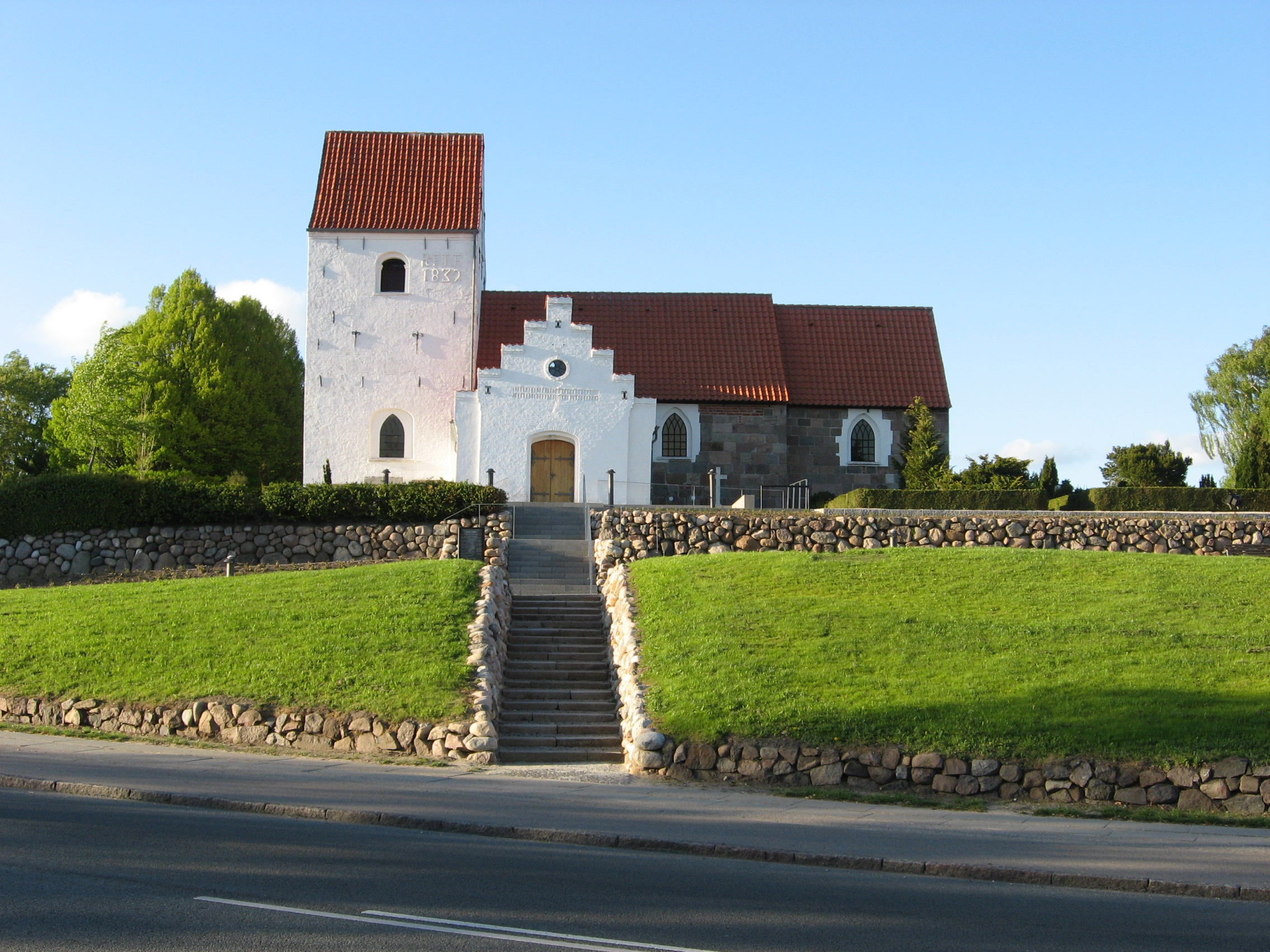
Hasle Church, a medieval church from the former village of Hasle

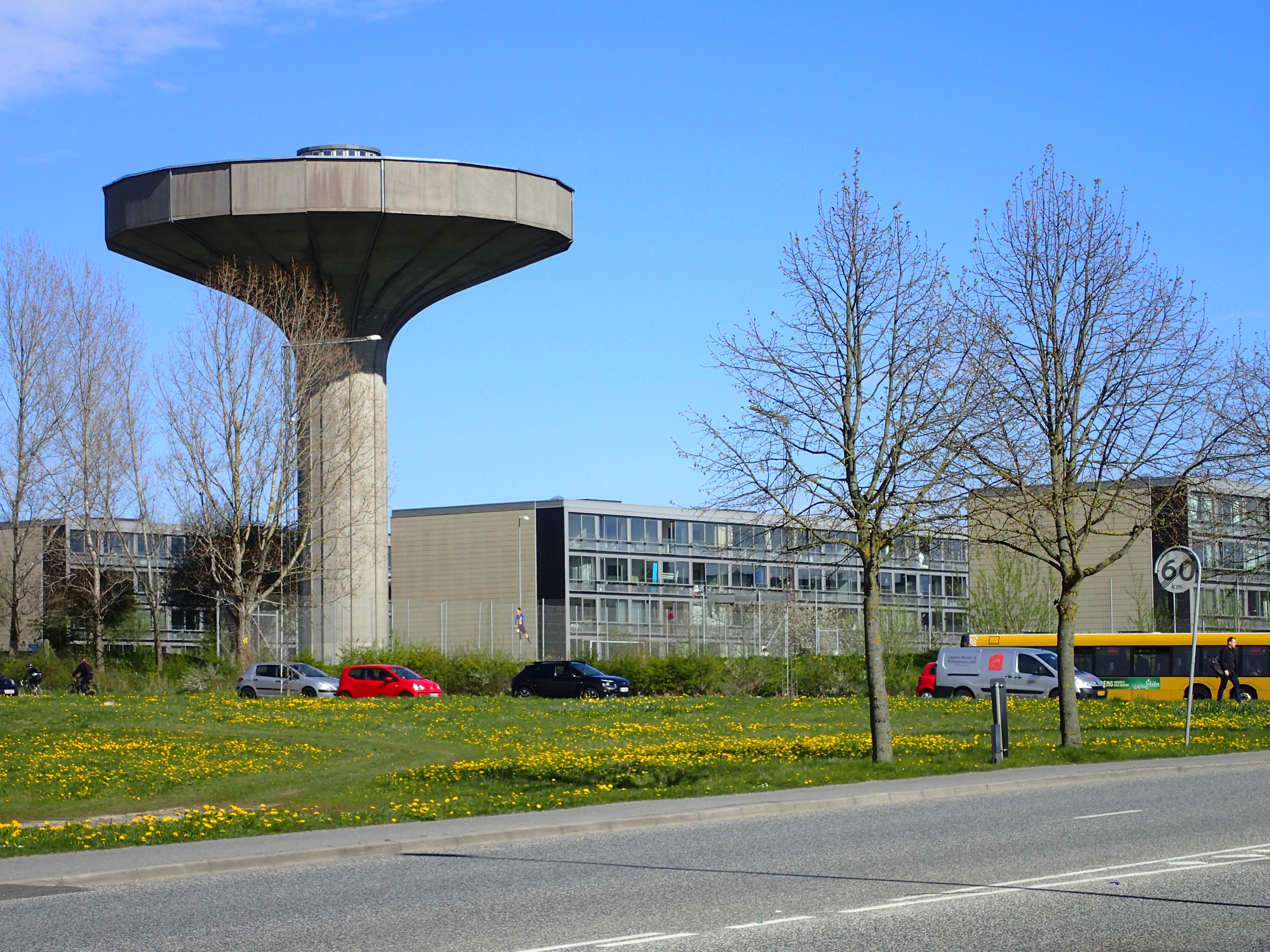
Hasle Water Tower, a landmark for the area

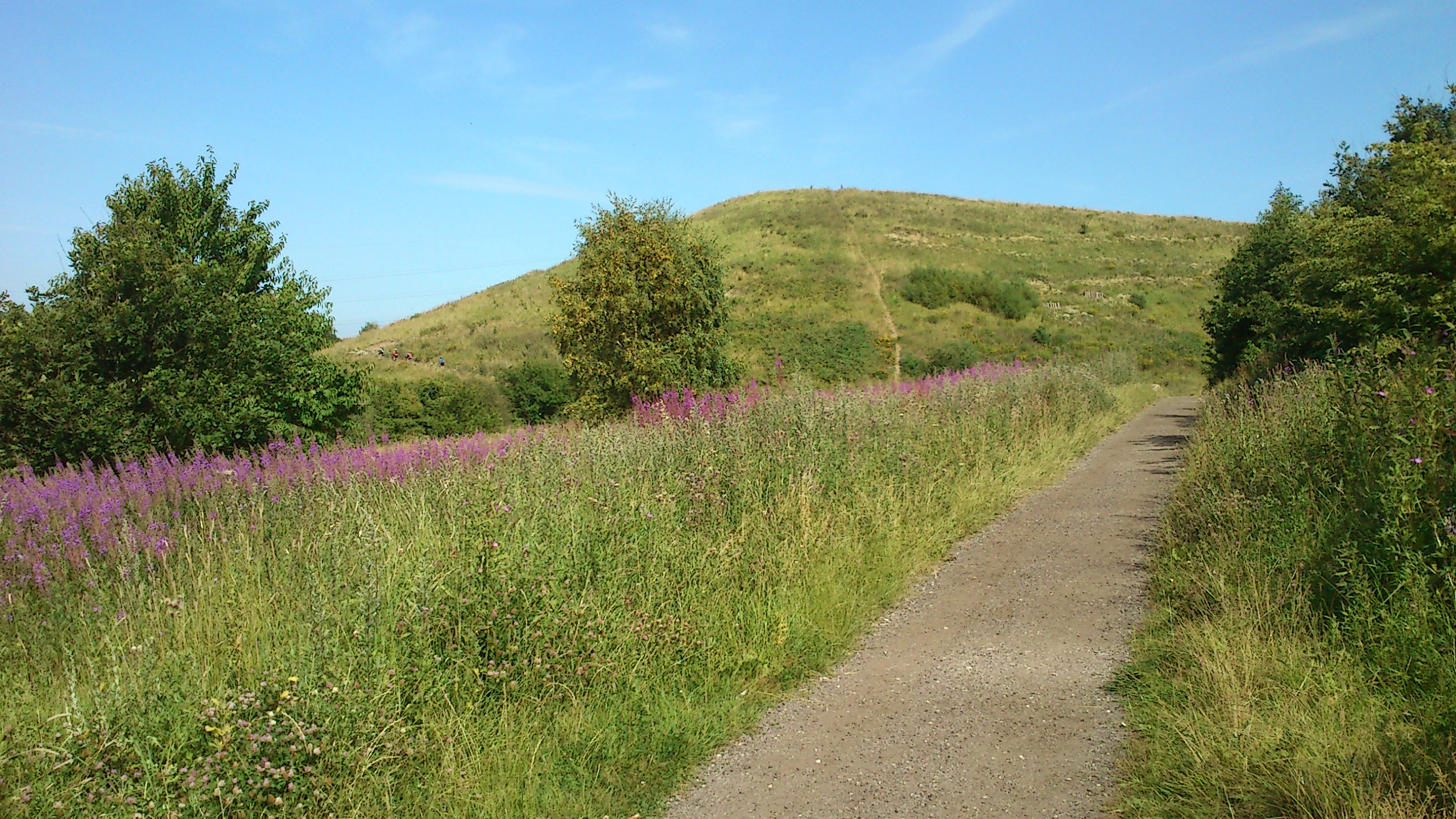
Hasle Hills, a recreative nature site

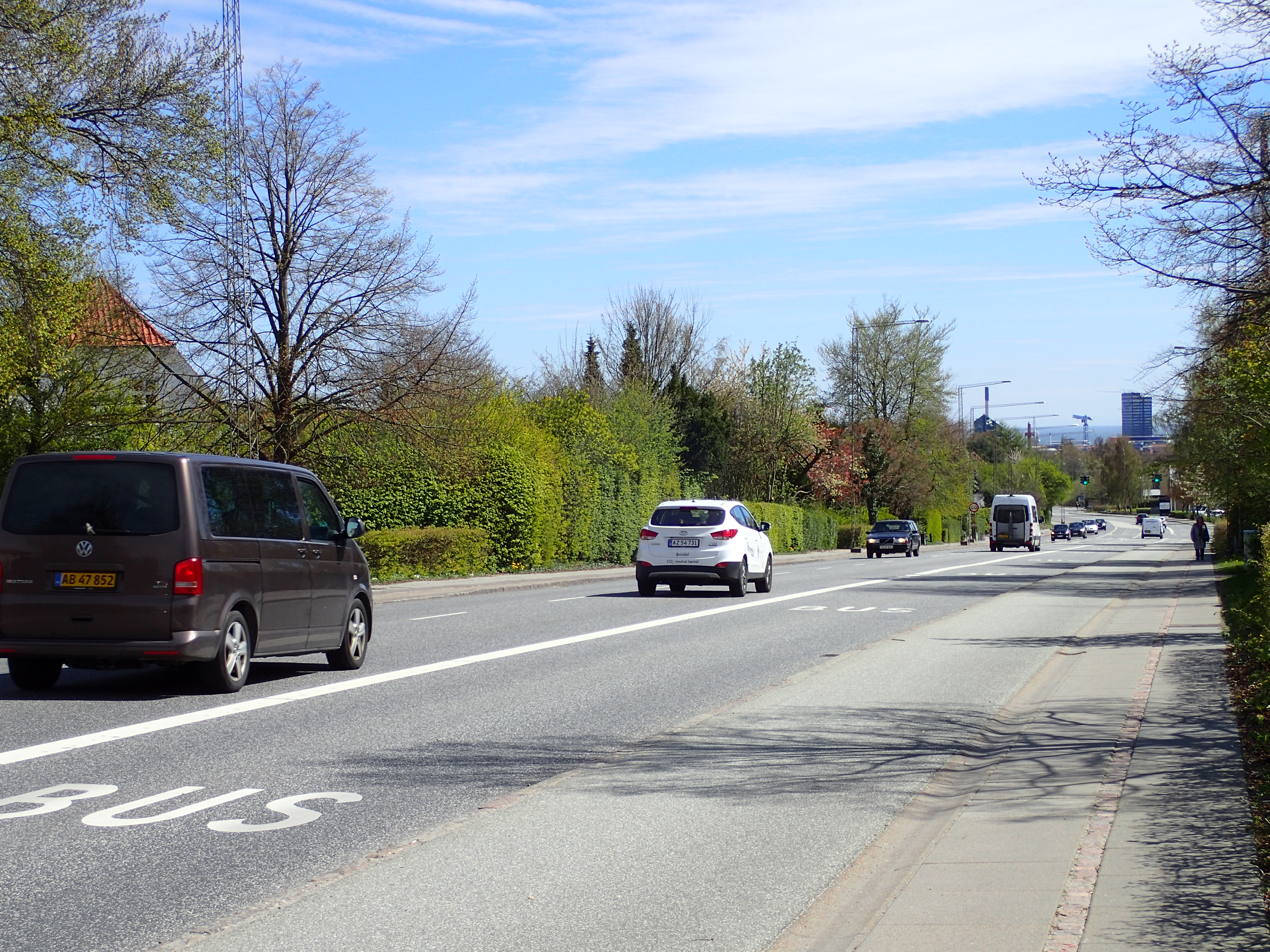
Viborgvej, a major traffic road radiating from the city centre.
