= Ole Bakke =

Norwegian-American architect

- Born: 1889; Norway
- Died: 1925 (aged 35–36); Missoula, Montana
- Occupation: Architect

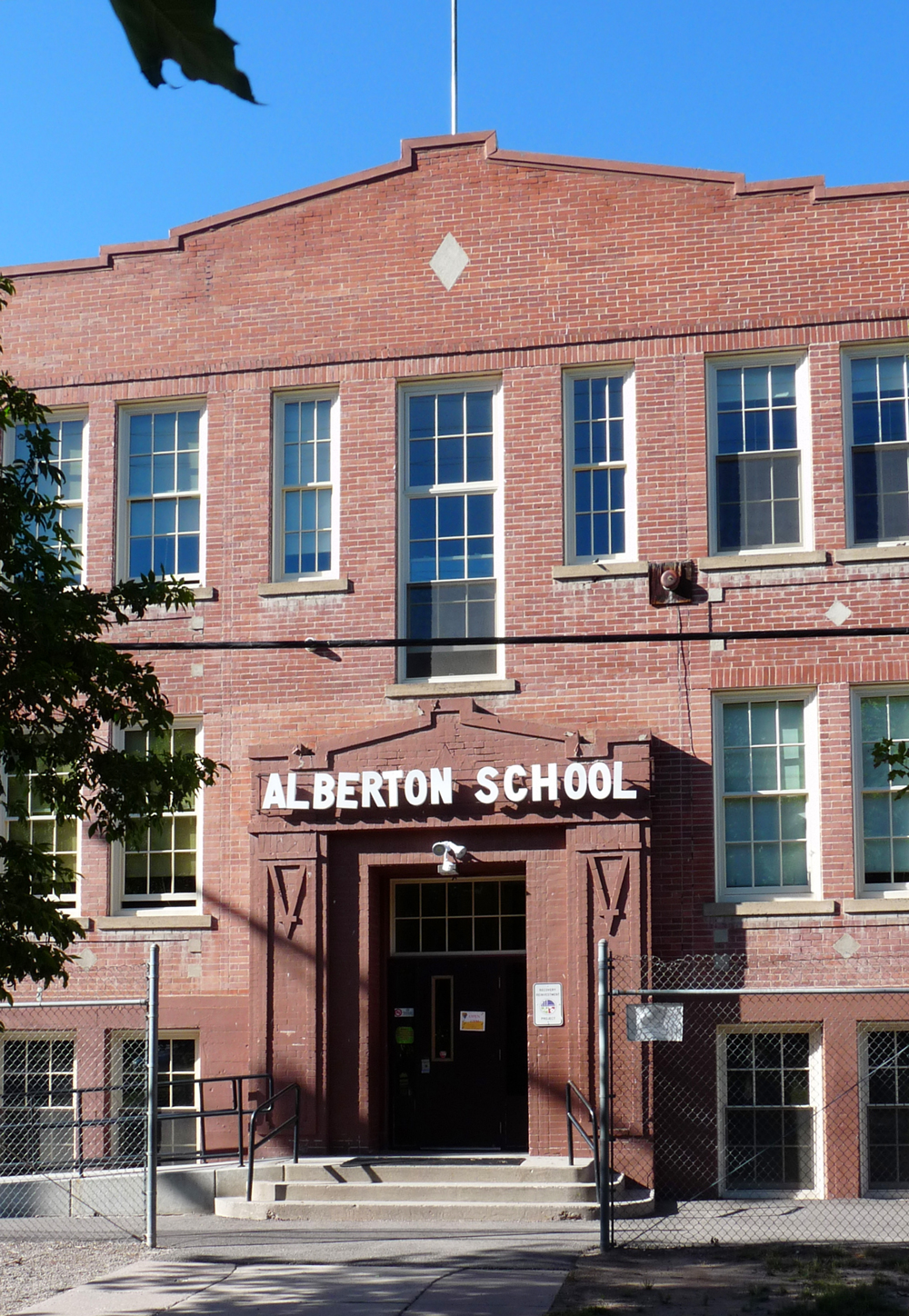
Alberton School, Alberton, 1918.

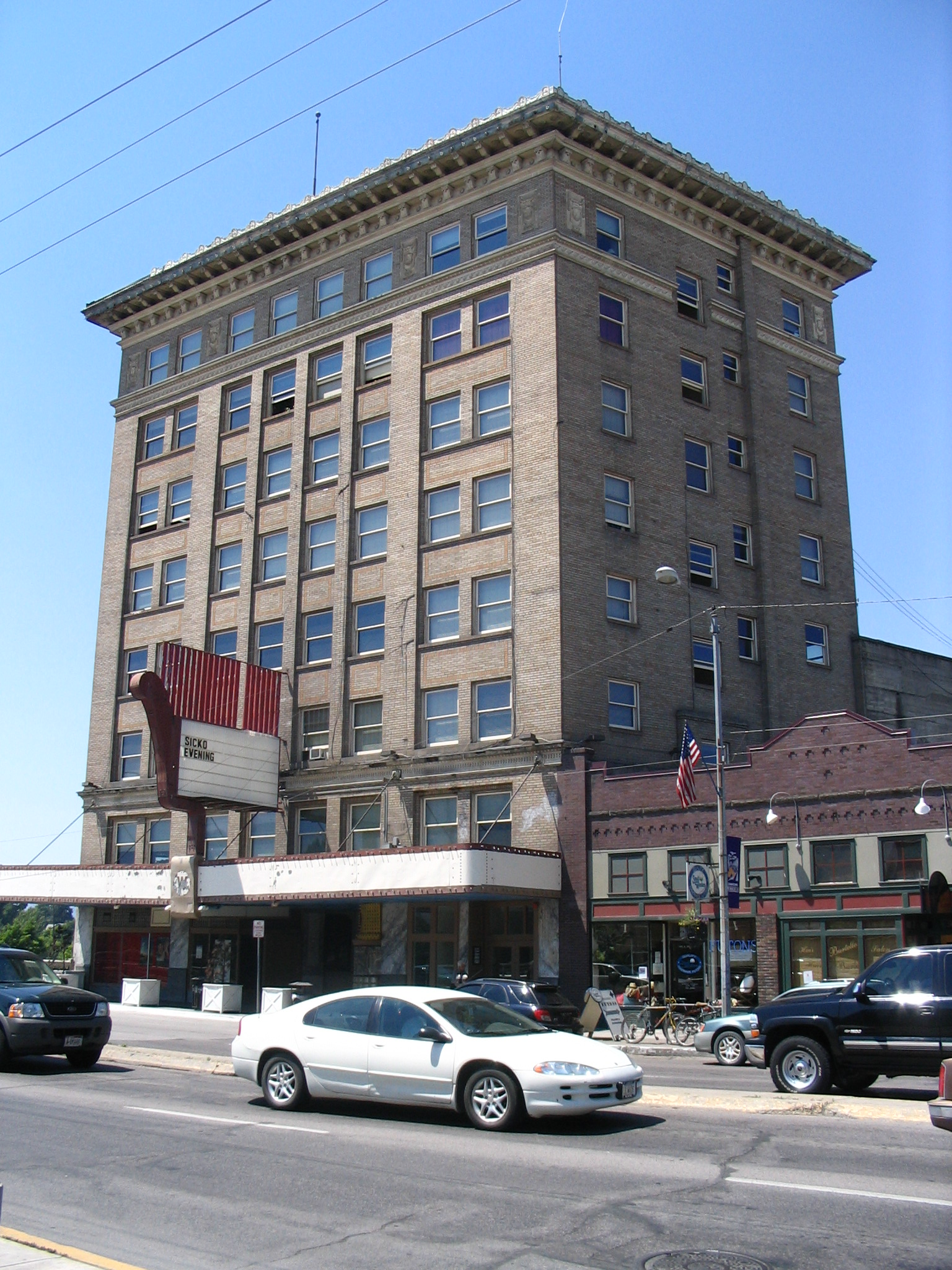
Smead-Simons Building, Missoula, 1920.

Ole Bakke (1889–1925) was a Norwegian-American architect who practiced in Missoula, a city in western Montana.

Bakke, a native of Norway, arrived in Missoula in 1900. As a teenager, he worked as a draftsman for A. J. Gibson, the region's leading architect. Upon Gibson's retirement in 1913, Bakke succeeded him in the business. However, Gibson continued to practice in a consulting position, and is thus credited with the design of the First Presbyterian Church, where he was an active member. Bakke practiced until his departure for Norway circa 1922. His office was succeeded by H. E. Kirkemo, who had joined Bakke as a draftsman in 1920. Bakke returned to Missoula in 1924, and died there in 1925.

In his time, Bakke was outside the American architectural mainstream. Many of his major works were designed in the Arts and Crafts style, embraced in England, but largely ignored in the United States. He designed a number of schools in this manner, including the Lincoln School in Missoula and the Alberton School in Alberton. He also embraced the Mission Revival, which appears in the school at Dixon (published in 1921) and the Franklin School in Missoula.

Before World War I, his few works in the mainstream were built primarily in cases where Bakke was under Gibson's influence, such as his addition to the Carnegie Public Library and the flanking wings of the Missoula County High School, both originally designed by Gibson. After the war, he turned away from his more innovative work, and to the standard revival styles of the day, resulting in the Classically-derived (though still within the Chicago School) Smead-Simons Building and the Italian Renaissance Revival Forestry Building at the University.

== Architectural works ==
- 1913 - Carnegie Public Library (Addition), 335 N Pattee St, Missoula, Montana
- 1913 - First Presbyterian Church, 235 S 5th St W, Missoula, Montana
  - Architect of record for A. J. Gibson
- 1914 - Lincoln School, 1209 Lolo St, Missoula, Montana
- 1914 - Agricultural (Commercial) Building, Missoula County Fairgrounds, Missoula, Montana
- 1916 - Franklin School, 1901 S 10th St W, Missoula, Montana
- 1917 - Missoula County High School (Addition), 900 S Higgins Ave, Missoula, Montana
- 1918 - Alberton School, 306 Railroad Ave, Alberton, Montana
- 1919 - Browning School, 112 1st Ave SE, Browning, Montana
- 1919 - Dixon School, 411 B St, Dixon, Montana
- 1920 - Missoula County High School (Addition), 900 S Higgins Ave, Missoula, Montana
- 1920 - Smead-Simons Building, 104 S Higgins Ave, Missoula, Montana
- 1921 - Forestry Building, University of Montana, Missoula, Montana
- 1921 - University Congregational Church, 405 University Ave, Missoula, Montana
- 1922 - Heating Plant, University of Montana, Missoula, Montana
  - In association with Clarence J. Forbis
