= Johnny Bakke =

Norwegian politician

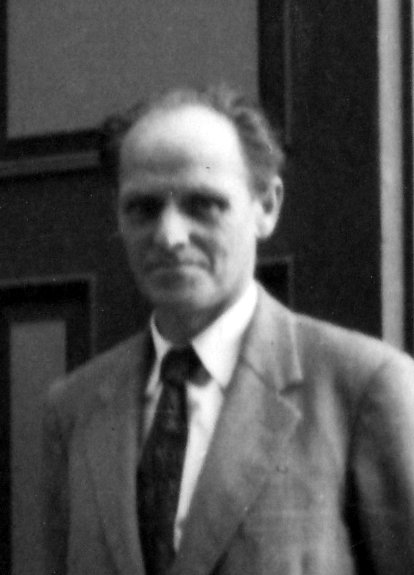
Johnny Bakke, ca 1955

Johnny Bakke (13 November 1908 – 2 November 1979) was a Norwegian politician for the Liberal Party.

He served as a deputy representative to the Norwegian Parliament from Sogn og Fjordane during the terms 1954–1957, 1958–1961, 1961–1965 and 1965–1969. He met in Storting for a total of 18 days.
