= Bispebjerg Bakke (building) =

Coordinates: 55°42′46″N 12°32′43″E

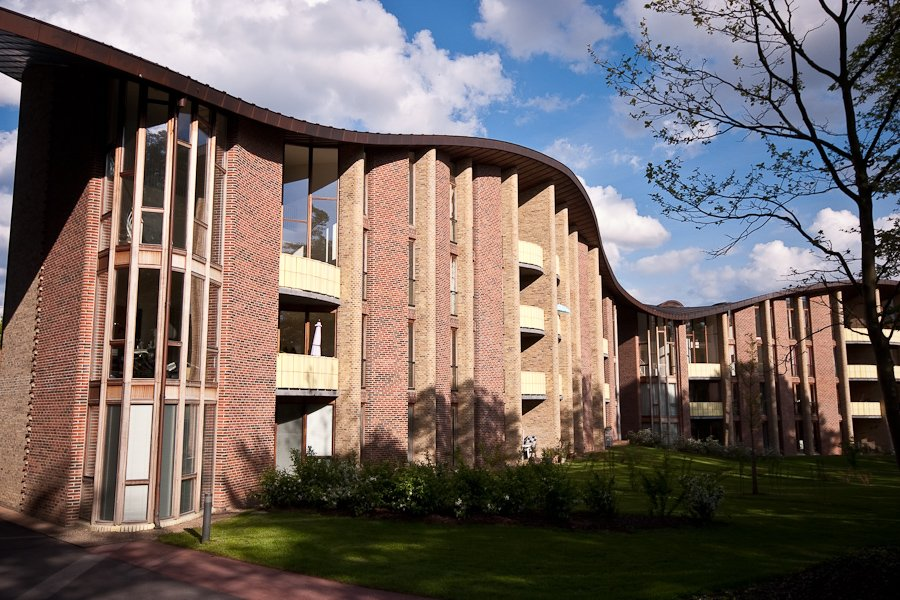
- Bispebjerg Bakke from the side
- Interactive map of the Bispebjerg Bakke area

General information
- Type: residential
- Architectural style: Modern
- Location: Bispebjerg
- Construction started: 2004
- Completed: 2006; 20 years ago
- Owner: Boligforeningen i København coop; administration by Almenbo coop

Technical details
- Structural system: Masonry
- Floor count: 3–9
- Floor area: 14,900 square metres (160,000 sq ft)

Design and construction
- Architects: Bjørn Nørgaard; Boldsen & Holm
- Structural engineer: Carl Bro

Bispebjerg Bakke is an apartment complex in the Bispebjerg district of Copenhagen, Denmark. It was designed by leading Danish sculptor Bjørn Nørgaard.

== History ==
The idea of building Bispebjerg Bakke was conceived in 1997 by Klaus Bonde Larsen, chairman of the Copenhagen Association of Crafts, and Professor at the Royal Danish Academy of Fine Arts and sculptor Bjørn Nørgaard. Both sat on the Committee for the Protection of Traditional Craftsmanship (Udvalget til sikring af traditionelle håndværk), which had been appointed by the Minister of Culture and the Minister of the Environment. The idea was to demonstrate that good buildings, in terms of design, craftsmanship and materials, can compete with today’s industrialized construction industry.

The small architectural practice Boldsen & Holm, with which Nørgaard had previously collaborated on the Copenhagen waterfront, was brought in as architects. The first models were executed in clay and Nørgaard has mentioned music as a source of inspiration for the design. Due to the unusual collaboration between artist and architect, the Realdania foundation decided to support the project.

The initial ambition to prove that it was possible to construct high quality buildings with traditional craftsmen instead of contracting firms and industrial building methods had to be moderated along the way. In the end. NCC was hired and concrete sections had to be introduced.

Construction started in August 2004 and the building was completed in 2006.

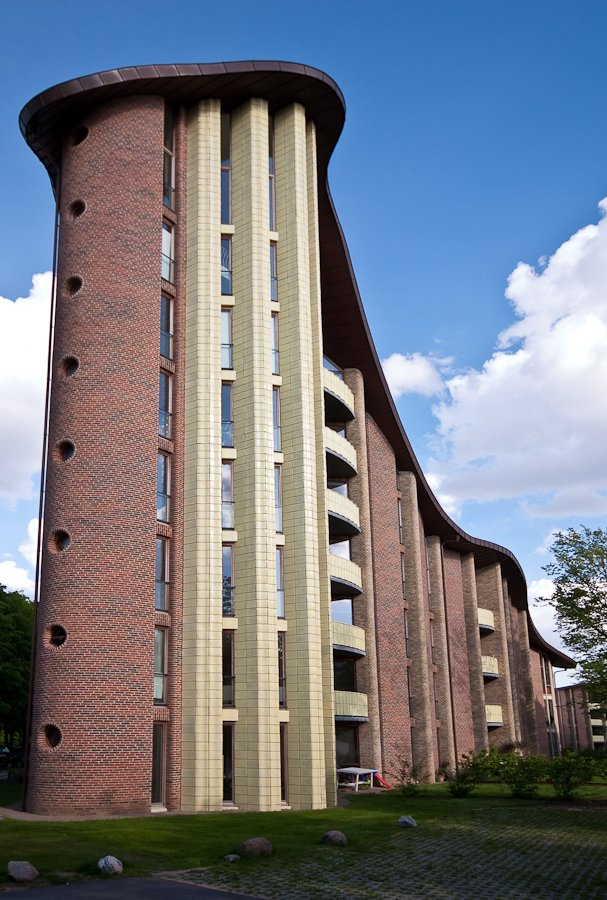
Bispebjerg Bakke

== Architecture ==
Bjørn Nørgaard was inspired by music when he made the first model of the complex which he moulded in clay. It consists of two buildings that wind like a serpent down the sloping site. The buildings are generally three to four storeys high, in places rising to eight storeys. The complex contains a total of 135 apartments.

In accord with the ethos of the project, it is generally executed in high quality materials. It is built with full-brick walls in a combination of red and yellow coal-burned bricks, a reference to the traditional apartment blocks in the Nørrebro working-class neighbourhood where red was used on the street and yellow on the courtyard side of the houses. The building has detailing in red and yellow glazed Chinese tiles on balconies and in the entrance halls leading to the staircases. Windows are made of wood and aluminium, roofs are capped with a combination of zinc or copper.

== Living at Bispebjerg Bakke ==
Bispebjerg Bakke contains only rental apartments. Although the apartments were originally envisioned as likely to attract "Grey Gold", i.e. well-off older tenants, a large percentage of the tenants are families with young children, some of whom have built walls and made other minor temporary adjustments to their open-plan apartments in order to make them suitable for family living. The complex also includes two purpose-built playgrounds.

== See also ==
- Architecture of Denmark
