= Realdania =

Danish association

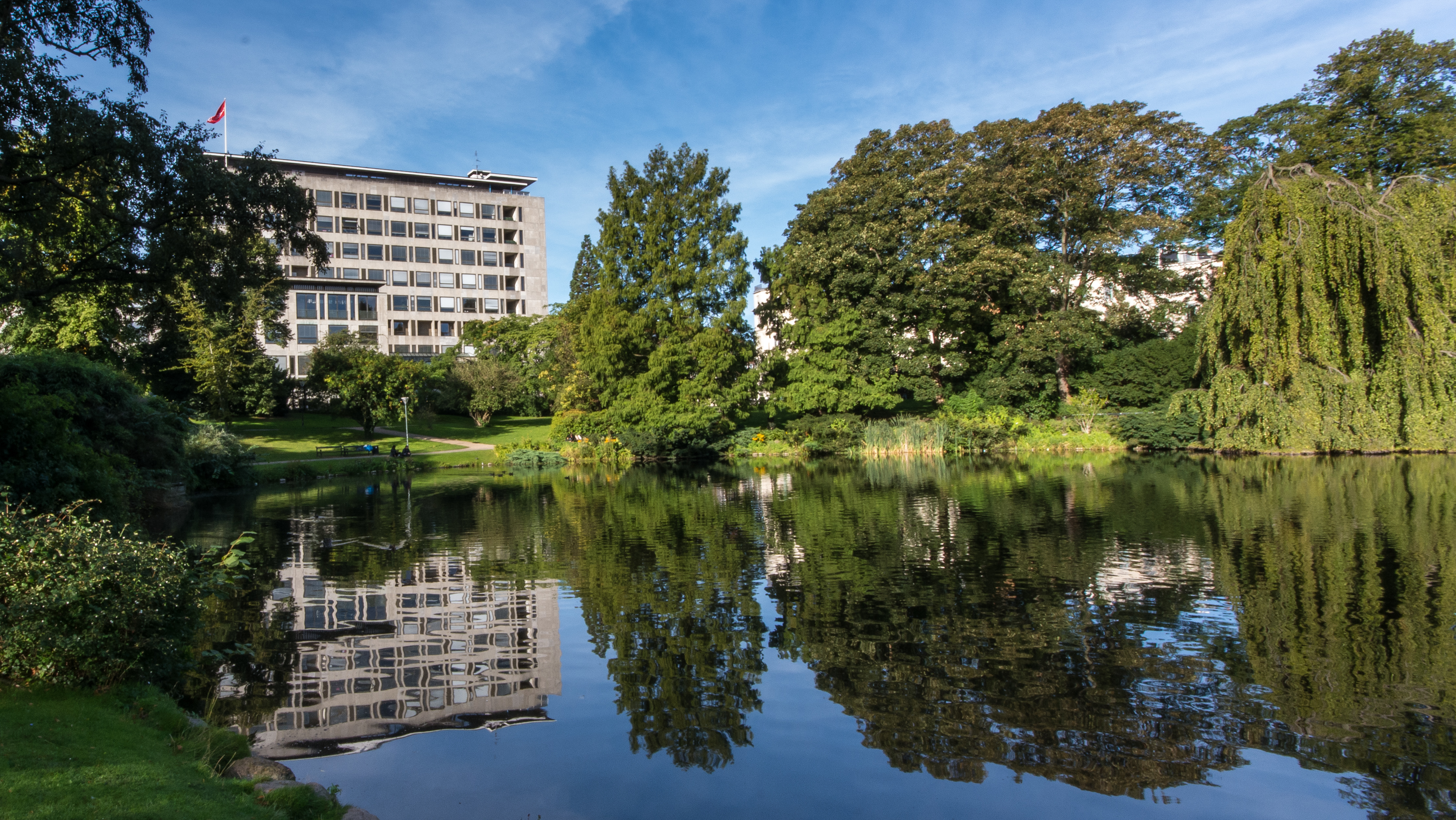
- Formation: 2000
- Headquarters: Copenhagen, Denmark
- Location: Denmark
- CEO: Jesper Nygård
- Website: https://www.realdania.org/

Realdania is a private association in Denmark which supports projects in architecture and planning. It was established in 2000 following the sale of Realkredit Danmark to Danske Bank, when a fund of approximately 20 billion kroner (EUR 2.7 billion) was put aside for "philanthropic" purposes. Realkredit Danmark was owned and controlled by its members (mortgage lenders), and this set-up was kept in Realdania.

== Structure ==
Realdania is often erroneously called a private charitable foundation, but Realdania's legal structure is that of an association operating as a business and not a foundation. Only owners of real estate in Denmark can become members of Realdania and participate in electing members of the board. Realdania has several subsidiaries. Realdania's closed structure has provoked criticism, and the association's funds has been called "stray billions" since they are controlled by a small network of people.

== Stated purposes ==
Its activity is concentrated on supporting projects in architecture and the built environment and is focused on three areas: cities, buildings and architectural heritage. The statutes of Realdania state that the association's purpose is to:

1. Support non-profit and charitable purposes, primarily in the field of the built environment, and primarily in Denmark,
2. Run an investment company,
3. Acquire shares in companies that are engaged in activities pertaining to the built environment,
4. Provide services related to the built environment, and
5. Acquire and construct real property in order to preserve the built heritage and develop Danish building practice.

It can be seen that investment activities predominate other ones, so that the avowed "philanthropic" or "charitable" nature of Realdania does not particularly stand out. At the end of 2011 Realdania's endowment stood at EUR 2.1 billion.

== Projects ==
Projects supported by Realdania include Bispebjerg Bakke, ARoS Aarhus Kunstmuseum in Aarhus and the Brewery Site in Copenhagen, commissioned from Dutch architect Rem Koolhaas. This last real estate development, the so-called "Blox" building including the Danish Architecture Centre, was inaugurated in 2018. Designed on the assumption that "the city has become too calm and beautified," it has been criticized as a "gloomy glass monolith."

The organization is a member of Philea - Philanthropy Europe Association

== See also ==
- Architecture of Denmark
- List of wealthiest charitable foundations
