= Kit Bakke =

Civil rights activist, author and former militant

Christopher Lynn "Kit" Bakke (born December 23, 1946) is an American activist and author. In the 1960s, she fought for women's rights and civil rights in addition to protesting the Vietnam War. In college, she helped to establish a new chapter of the Students for a Democratic Society (SDS). Later, she became a member of the Weathermen, also called the Weather Underground, a militant leftist group.

== Early life ==
Christopher Lynn Bakke, otherwise known as "Kit" Bakke, was born in 1946. She grew up in a rural area near Seattle, Washington, with liberal parents and two younger brothers in a household that valued success in school above all else. Her father, Jack Bakke, was a physician with a passion for human biology, anatomy and the practice of medicine. Her mother, an active member of the League of Women Voters, championed various causes including voter education and keeping water supplies clean. All of her grandparents were college graduates.

== Students for a Democratic Society ==
After graduating from high school, Bakke went on to Bryn Mawr College in Pennsylvania. While there, she helped to establish a new Students for a Democratic Society (SDS) chapter at her college. As a member of SDS, she was involved with issues including civil rights, women's liberation, and anti-war demonstrations. Bakke and Kathy Boudin, along with other members of the SDS participated in various protests, including a 24-day protest against the Vietnam War, during which she refused to eat or drink. Bakke also helped end the dress requirement that women were required to wear skirts in class, and helped to unionize the "live in maids".

In her last undergraduate year, she shifted her focus to issues in the inner city rather than problems within the college. In the summer of 1969 at the SDS Convention in Chicago, SDS came apart. Bakke became part of a group that broke away from the SDS which was labeled the "Action Faction" or the "Weatherman". They believed that in order for a revolution to occur, they had to take militant action to provoke it.

Bakke graduated in 1968, with an undergraduate degree in political science. She then got a job as a journalist for a Seattle suburban newspaper with the intent of gaining a better understanding by getting an inside view of the "nominating conventions". When reporting on demonstrations, she took pictures, interviewed participants, and wrote articles.

== Cuba ==
Bakke went to Havana, Cuba, for eight days in July 1969 to meet with the members of the Democratic Republic of Vietnam and Provisional Revolutionary Government to discuss the opposition movements going on in the United States. While accounts of the number of SDS participants vary, according to the FBI summary, 13 people, including Bernardine Dohrn, a key figure in the Weatherman, went on the trip to Cuba.

Only a few months after returning from Cuba, in October 1969, she participated in the Chicago riot termed the "Days of Rage" and was arrested. Bakke was also jailed in Cook County for three days after "some particularly aggressive street fighting".

== Life underground ==
Bakke lived in political collectives in Oakland, Cleveland, New Mexico and the Westside of Chicago. While in Chicago, Bakke helped to print the Weatherman's publication, the New Left Notes. She says that in the communes she lived with "no more than ten or eleven..." of her fellow Weathermen. While she was in the Weather Underground the FBI amassed a file of over 400 pages on Kit Bakke, and classified her as a "'Priority I Security Index Subject.'"

In the early 1970s, Kit was pregnant with her first child, Maya, while she participated in an anti Vietnam War demonstration which got out of hand. While fleeing from the police and trying to avoid the tear gas, police batons, and barrels of firearms, Kit decided to leave the Weather Underground.

== Later life ==
Bakke has earned two bachelor's degrees and two master's degrees: two in nursing, one in political science, and one in public health.

She moved to Seattle with her young daughter, Maya, to be close to family. She married in 1982. For thirteen years, Bakke worked as an oncology nurse at Children's Regional Hospital in Seattle. In the 2000s, she was involved with charities that tackle local issues, such as drug abuse and homelessness.

Bakke remained underground for two years, and in that time cut off all contact with her parents. She has expressed guilt about the effect of her actions on her parents, but according to Flanigan, "Bakke says she doesn't have any regrets. ‘Of course we made mistakes, but everyone makes mistakes... I believe in putting yourself out there for the things you care about. If you don't do that, you're going to live a diminished life.'" In another interview, Bakke describes the Students for a Democratic Society as being arrogant bullies.

Bakke has raised two daughters and lives in Seattle with her husband. She has written three books: Miss Alcott's Email, Dancing On the Edge, and Protest on Trial: The Seattle 7 Conspiracy.
