= C. Johan Bakkes =

South African writer

Casparus Johan "C. Johan" Bakkes (born 21 October 1956, Stellenbosch) is a noted South African writer. He is the son of Cas and Margaret Bakkes and the brother of Christiaan Bakkes, Marius, and Matilde Bakkes.

He is married to artist Nanna Vorster-Bakkes. Aqualified Chartered Accountant (SA), he is also a full-time professor at the University of the Western Cape in Cape Town, where he lectures Management Accounting.

== Works ==
His published works consist of essays, most dealing with his travel experiences.

- Moer toe die vreemde in (2001)
- Nou's ons in ons donner (2006)
- To Hell and Gone (2008) (an English translation of the essays contained in the two books above)
- Nørrevøk (2008)
- samoe(r)sa reis (2010)
- Oepse Daisy (2011)
- Openbaring (2016)
