= Christiaan Bakkes =

South African writer

Christiaan Mathys Bakkes (born 3 August 1965, in Vredenburg, South Africa) is a South African writer. He is the son of Cas and Margaret Bakkes and the brother of Marius, Matilde and Casparus. He is married to Marcia Ann Fargnoli, an environmental lawyer.

He received a National Diploma in Nature Conservation and led an anti-poaching unit as part of his military service. For a time, he worked as a game ranger in the Kruger National Park, where during the early 1990s he was required to be involved in elephant culling, a practice to which he developed ethical objections. In 1994 he suffered a serious injury inside the park in a crocodile attack. Hereafter he commenced a new career in the Damaraland desert, where he acted as guide and conservation official for Wilderness Safaris.

He and his wife Marcia founded a Wildlife Crime Project at the Legal Assistance Centre in Namibia where they focused on wildlife crime advocacy and environmental education. They moved back to South Africa in 2018 where he trained safari guides and ran environmental education projects. He currently participates in local conservation efforts and continues to write articles and books.

== Titles of published works ==
- 1998- Die Lang Pad van Stoffel Mathysen. -Novel. Selected as setworks for Afrikaans first language, Grade 10 Gauteng.
- 2000- Stoffel in die Wilderness. -Short Stories.
- 2002- Skuilplek. – Novel.
- 2004- Stoffel by die Afdraai Pad. -Short Stories. Shortlisted for the M Net Prize for short stories – 2005.
- 2007- Stoffel se Veldnotas. -Short Stories.
- 2008- In Bushveld and Desert.A Ranger's Life. -Short Stories. Selection translated into English.
- 2010- Stoffel in Afrika. -Short Stories.
- 2012- Bushveld, Desert and Dogs. -Short Stories. Selection translated into English.
- 2012- Stoffel op Safari. -Short Stories.
- 2014- Krokodil aan my Skouer. -Novel.
- 2016- Beste Stories. -Short Stories. Previously Published.
- 2018- Plunderwoestyn. -Novel.
- 2026- Soetdoring in die Ruigtes. -Historical Novel.
