= Margaret Bakkes =

South African writer

- Born: 14 December 1931; South Africa
- Died: 29 June 2016 (aged 84)
- Occupation: Writer

Margaret Bakkes (14 December 1931 – 29 June 2016) was a South African writer.

She was married to historian Cas Bakkes, and was the mother of four children: C. Johan Bakkes, Marius, Matilde, and Christiaan Bakkes, two of whom—Johannes and Christiaan—also became writers.

== Early life ==
Margaret Magdel Bakkes was born on 14 December 1931 on a farm in the Sterkstroom district of the Stormberg region in what is now the Eastern Cape province of South Africa. She was the eldest child of Hendrik Aucamp and Mathilda de Villiers; her mother worked as a music teacher.

From an early age, Bakkes developed a strong attachment to reading, aided by the local town library in Sterkstroom. Her early reading included the English novel Wuthering Heights as well as early Afrikaans authors, and she reportedly expressed a wish from girlhood to one day produce a book of her own in Afrikaans. After completing her secondary school, Bakkes relocated to Pretoria, where she spent a year working at the Translation Bureau (Vertaalburo) before commencing her tertiary studies. She enrolled at the University of Pretoria, where she earned a Bachelor of Arts degree with majors in Afrikaans, English, and History.

== Career ==
Following her graduation, she taught for two years at Hoërskool Clapham in Pretoria.It was during this period that she married Casper Bakkes, a military historian who later became Director of the Institute for Historical Research at the Human Sciences Research Council in Pretoria.

Bakkes published her first short story in a magazine in 1954, marking the beginning of a literary career that would span over sixty years. In the 1960s, the publisher Leon Rousseau approached her with an offer of a book contract, and her debut collection of short stories appeared in 1966 under the imprint of Human & Rousseau — a publishing house with which she would maintain a long association. She gradually established herself as a writer of short fiction whose work was widely set as prescribed reading in South African schools and frequently included in anthologies of Afrikaans literature.

Alongside her short stories, Bakkes also made her mark as a novelist, particularly through her historical fiction. Notable among these longer works are Elegie vir 'n onbekende, Susanna die geliefde, and Kroniek van die sewe blou waens, the last of which draws on the history of the Voortrekker leader Gert Maritz. A contemporary review quoted in Die Burger (19 July 1984) praised the writer for engaging the reader with narrative skill, drawing characters with both precision and empathy in her work. Bakkes died on 29 June 2016 at the age of 84.

== Works ==
- Die Reise Van Olga Dolsjikowa En Ander Omswerwinge
- Kroniek Van Die Sewe Blou Waens: Die Kort Lewe Van Gert Maritz
- Littekens: Stories En Memories
- Susanna Die Geliefde
- Waar Jou Skat Is
- Baksel in Die Môre
- Ontheemdes
- Benedicta
