= Aarhus V =

Coordinates: 56°10′18″N 10°09′47″E

- Postal district
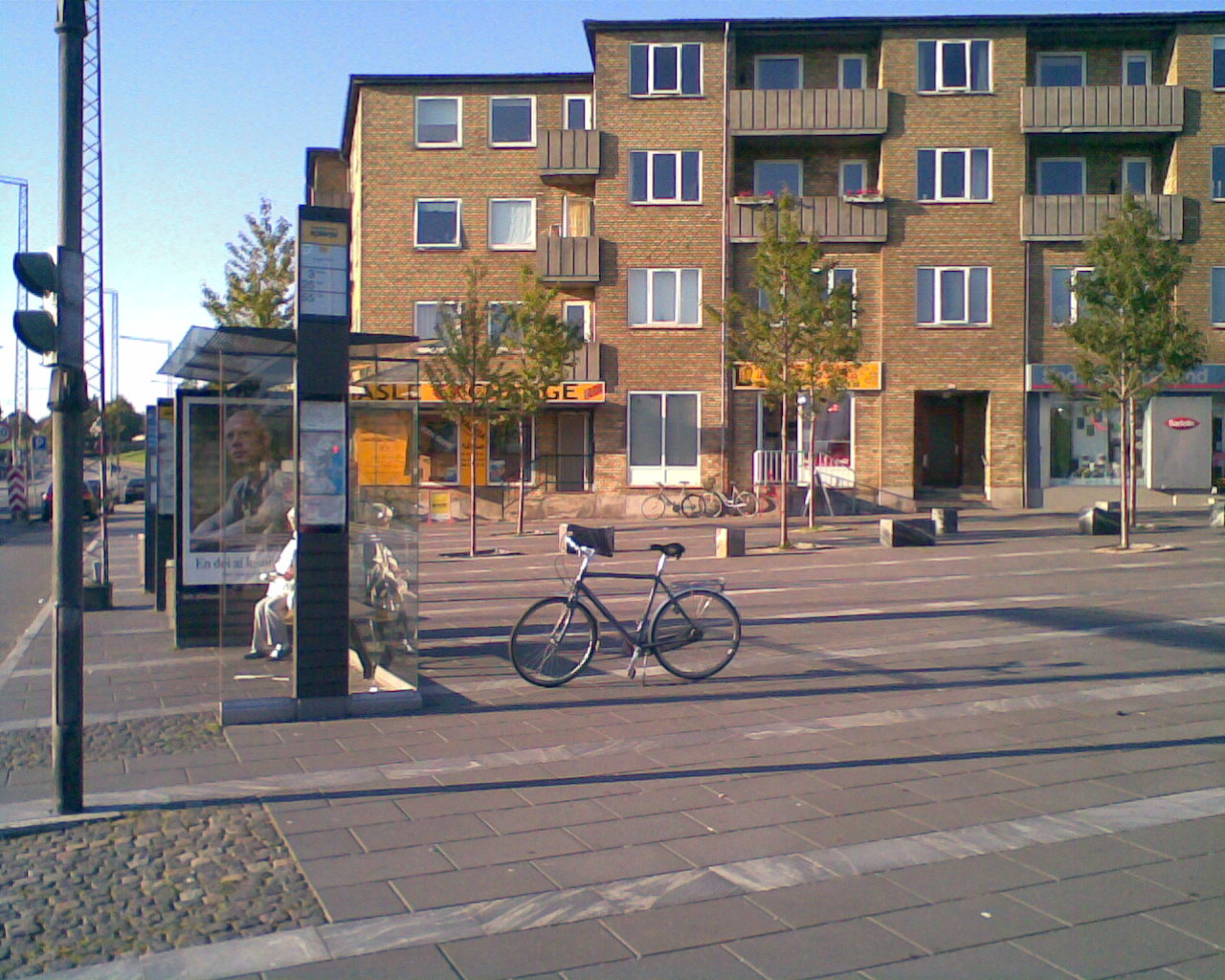
- The square of Hasle Torv.
- Interactive map of Aarhus V
- City: Aarhus
- Demonym(s): Aarhusianer (English: Aarhusian)
- Postal code: 8210

Aarhus Vest (lit.: Aarhus West) or Aarhus V, is a postal district in the city of Aarhus, consisting of Hasle, Herredsvang, Møllevangen and Frydenlund.

== Quarters and neighborhoods ==
=== Møllevangen ===
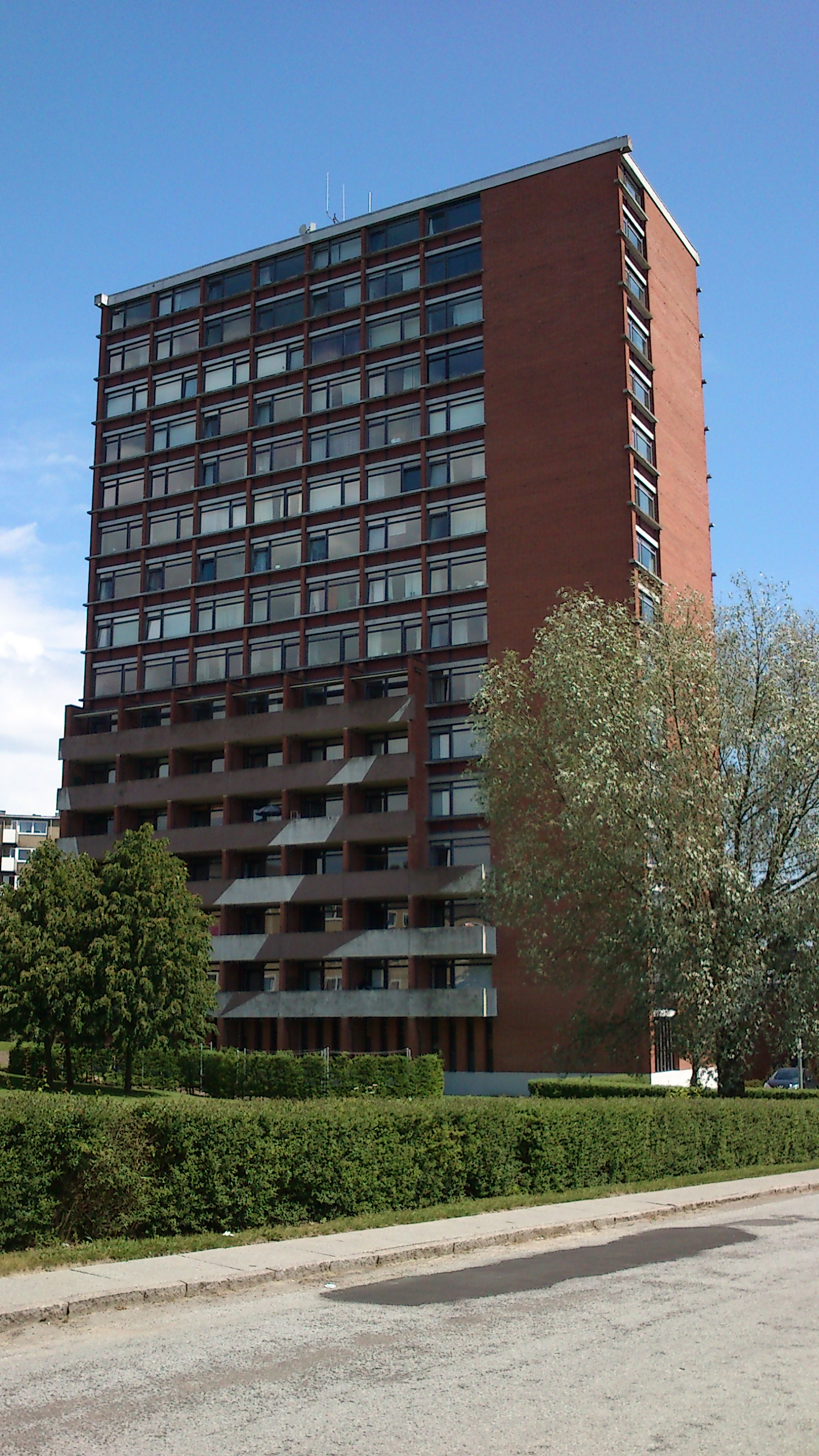
The skyline of Møllevangen is dominated by Højhus Charlottehøj - one of the only brick-constructed highrises in Denmark.

Built primarily in the 1940s, Møllevangen has many four-storey apartment blocks in red or yellow brick, but also larger detached house areas and several townhouses. The area is situated close to Aarhus Botanical Gardens and the shopping mall of Storcenter Nord. Møllevangen has two churches, a school and a nursing and retirement center.

==== Charlottehøj ====
The skyline of Møllevangen, is dominated by one of the only brick-constructed highrises in the country; a 16-story red apartment block in the neighbourhood of Charlottehøj. In the northwest, lies the residential area of Finnebyen; a well defined neighbourhood of 122 colourful wooden houses from Finland, established in 1947-48 to address the increased housing needs after World War II. Finnebyen will perhaps be granted a local conservation status in the near future. In the west, there are large playing fields for association football and athletics and beyond that, a large association of allotments.

==== Fuglebakken ====
This is a detached housing area from the 1920s, south of Charlottehøj. In the east there are two dormitories, one of which is dedicated to descendants of members of the Danish resistance movement during the German occupation. There is a public memorial grove for Danish Nazi Concentration Camp prisoners in association with the dormitory grounds here. Business Academy Aarhus is situated on the outskirts of the neighbourhood, at the heavily trafficked meeting point of Viborg Vej and the Ring 1 ring road.

=== Frydenlund ===
Frydenlund is a residential area southwest of Møllevangen, mainly consisting of the characteristic high rise concrete apartments from the 1960s and 70s, constructed of large, prefabricated concrete slabs. Approximately 2,500 people live in Frydenlund and they represent a diverse social and ethnic background. 58% are ethnic Danes and 42% are immigrants or descendants of immigrants. There is a large youth and child center (an adventure playground), with playgrounds, animal farms, facilities for sports, etc.

=== Herredsvang ===
This neighbourhood is located northwest of Møllevangen and consists mainly of apartment blocks in various designs, but with a diverse mix of townhouses, detached houses and a dormitory as well. Around 5,000 citizens are living here, with 50% of foreign heritage. There is a church in Herredsvang and easy access to several recreational nature sites such as Marienlyst Park, Brendstrup Skov and Vestereng. There are many community activities in Herredsvang, with institutions such as a culture house and several youth and child centres, including a small farm with livestock and forest kindergartens.

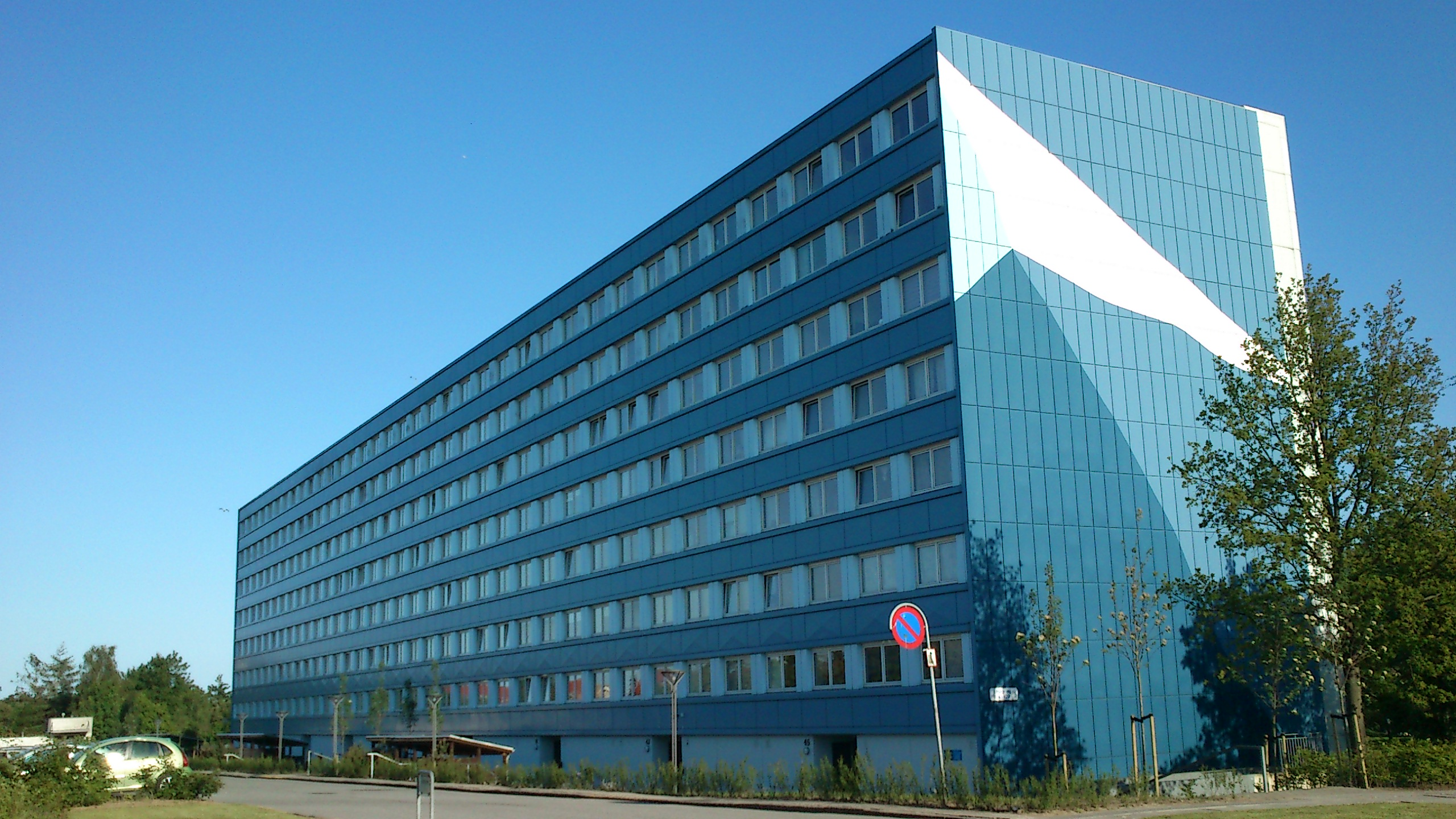
One of the apartment blocks in Frydenlund.

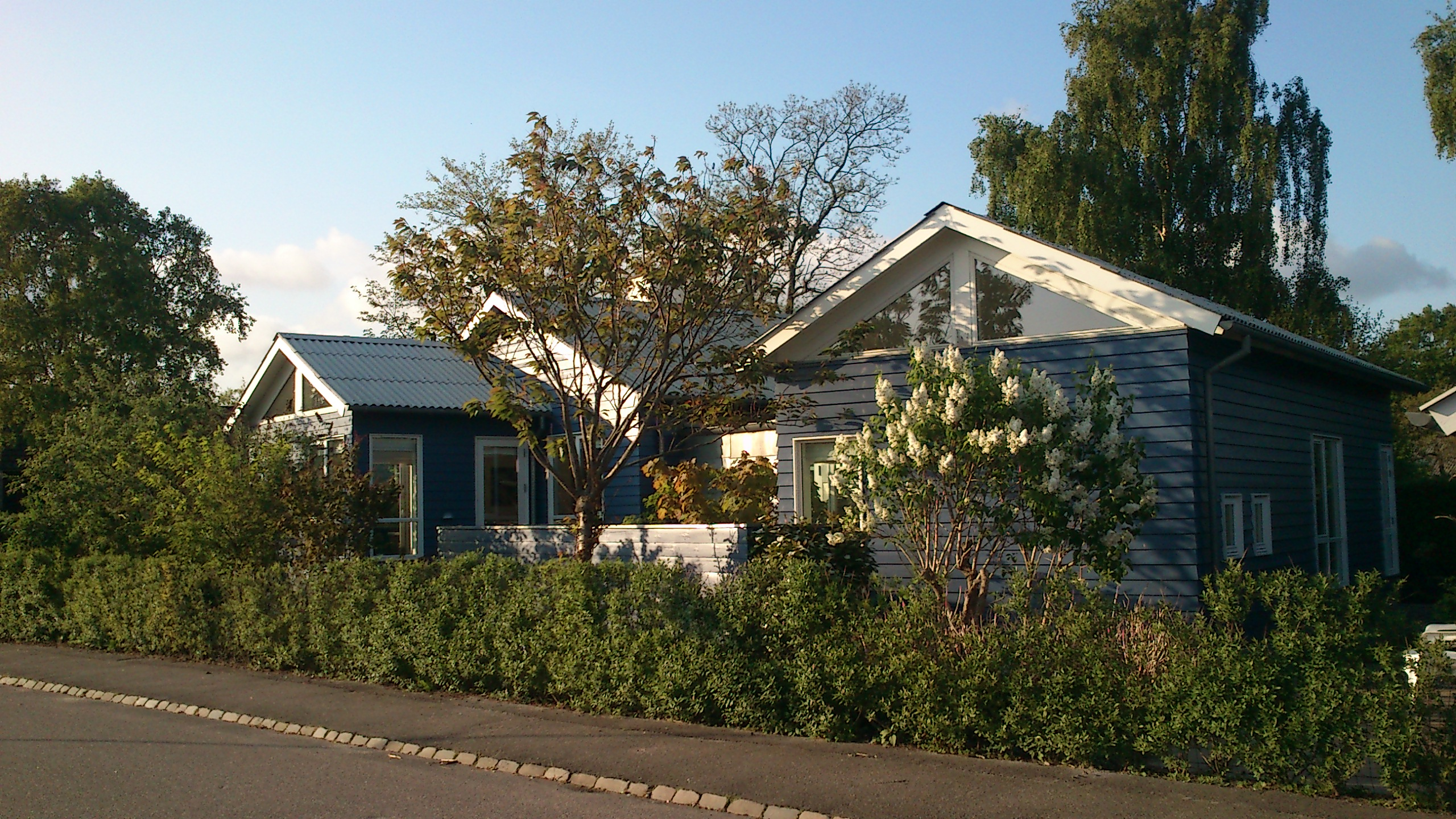
Finnebyen in Møllevangen, comprise many colourful wooden houses.

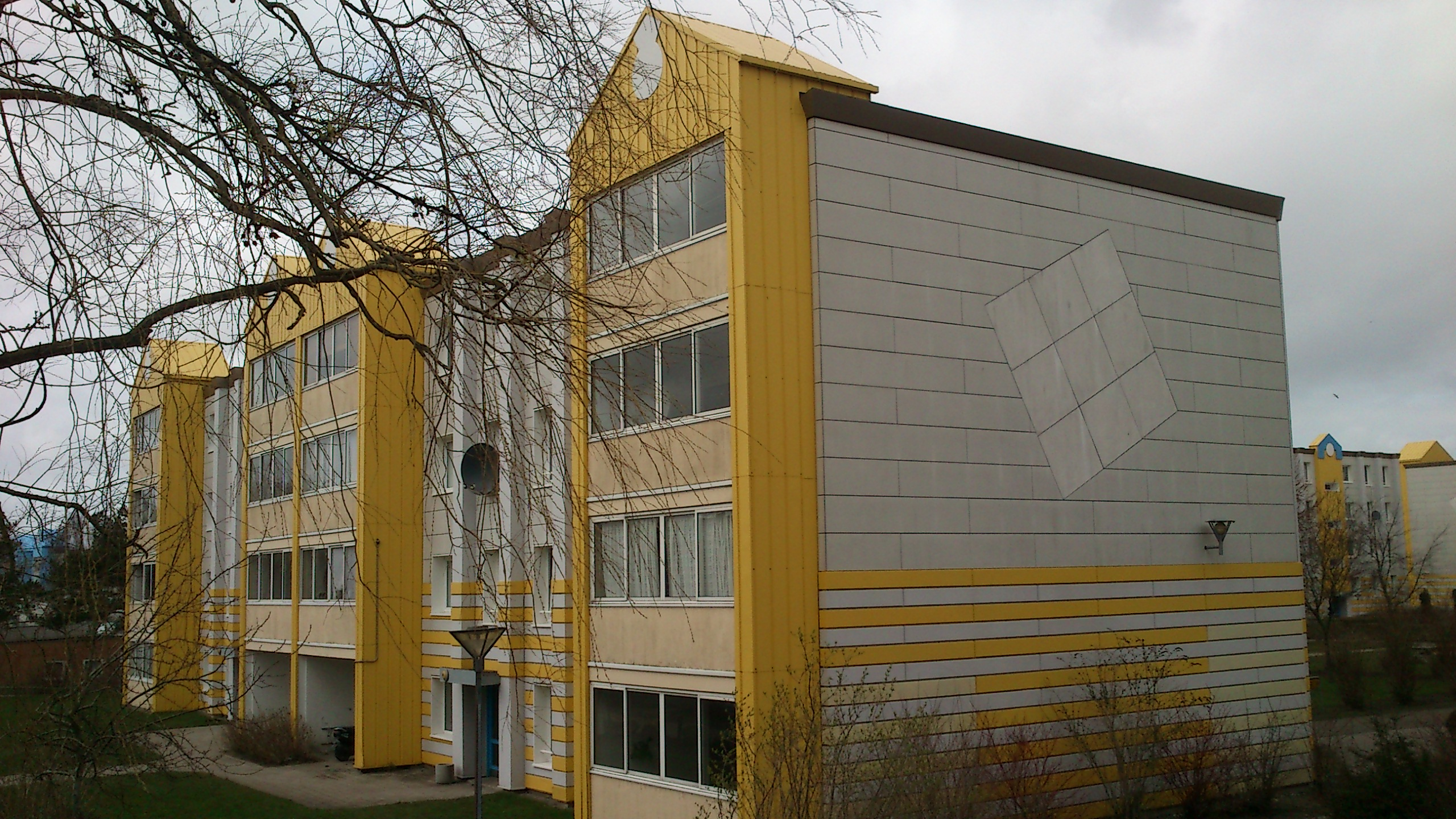
From Rydevænget in Herredsvang. The strong colours are visible from afar, across the skyline of Aarhus V.

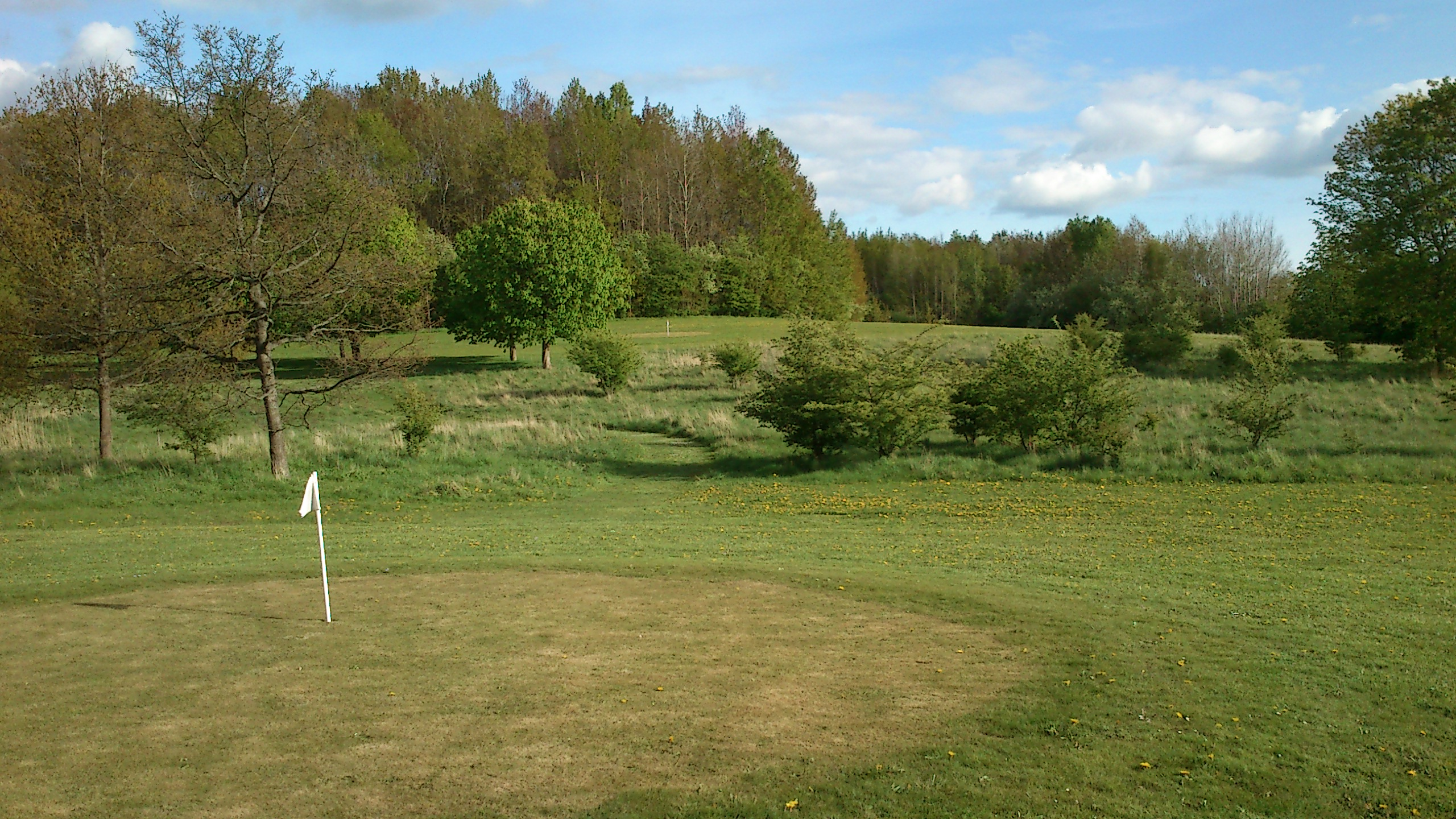
Marienlystparken is one of the biggest parks in Aarhus and is offering many recreational activities in both summer and winter.

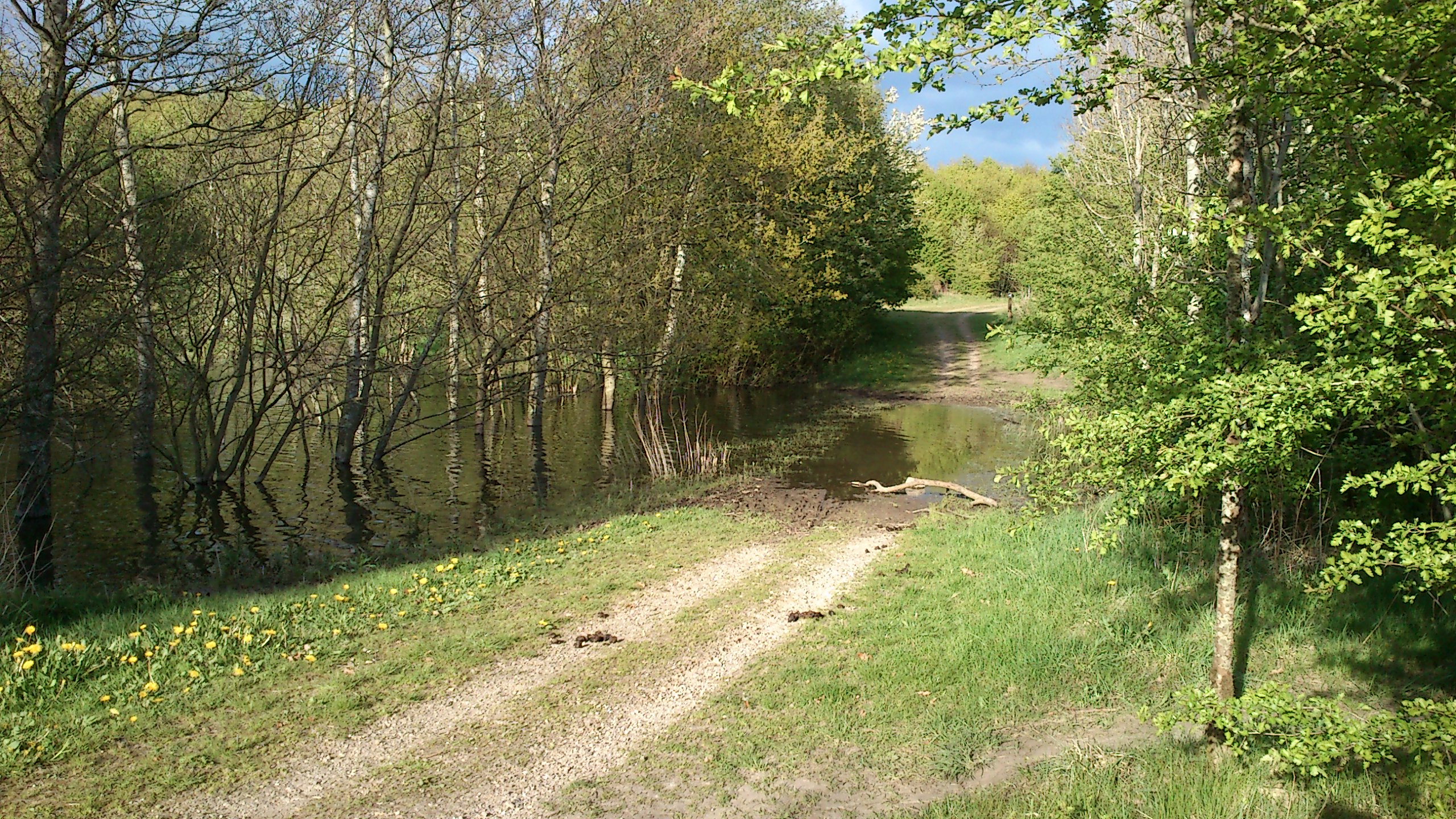
From Brendstrup Skov beyond Marienlystparken.

=== Hasle ===
Hasle, with its 21,700 inhabitants, is by far the biggest part of Aarhus V and is divided into Hasle Vest and Gamle Hasle (Old Hasle).

Hasle Vest is located west of the main road Viborgvej and was developed from 1954 and built in the 1960s. The area consists primarily of suburban houses and Marienlyst Park. In the middle of the area and in the northern parts, high rise concrete apartments characterise several public housing programs and projects, many of which are homes to immigrants. The public housing area of Bispehaven, is designated as an immigrant "ghetto" in Aarhus V; approx. 70% of the inhabitants are immigrants. Hasle ends east of the ring road Ring 2, as there was uncertainty about where the planned Jutland-Interstate E45 was to be located, when the area was in the planning phase.

Gamle Hasle (Old Hasle) extends east and south, with detached houses and some apartments. The center of the area is Hasle Torv, a square at the very busy junction of Viborgvej and Ryhavevej.

== Music and culture ==
The hip hop culture has been strongly represented in Aarhus V, in particular in the 2000s, when the milieu here gave rise to the so-called Aarhus-V style. The most famous rappers in or from the district includes L.O.C. (Liam O'Connor,), Johnson and U$O, creators of the group B.A.N.G.E.R.S, the Pimp-A-Lot crew and the two rappers Kajser A and Ham Den Lange comprising the Haven Morgan group. Break dance and hip hop schools are numerous in Aarhus V, including Rap Akademiet (the Rap Academy).

== See also ==
Other postal districts in Aarhus includes:

- Aarhus C
- Aarhus N
- Viby J
- Højbjerg
- Brabrand

== Sources ==
- Map of Århus V from www.krak.dk
- Århus V: Danish
- Herredsvang: Danish
- Hasle: Danish
- Hasle: Danish
- https://web.archive.org/web/20080404002410/http://www.llgruppen.dk/side4464.html
