= Aarhus School of Marine and Technical Engineering =

- Aarhus Maskinmesterskole
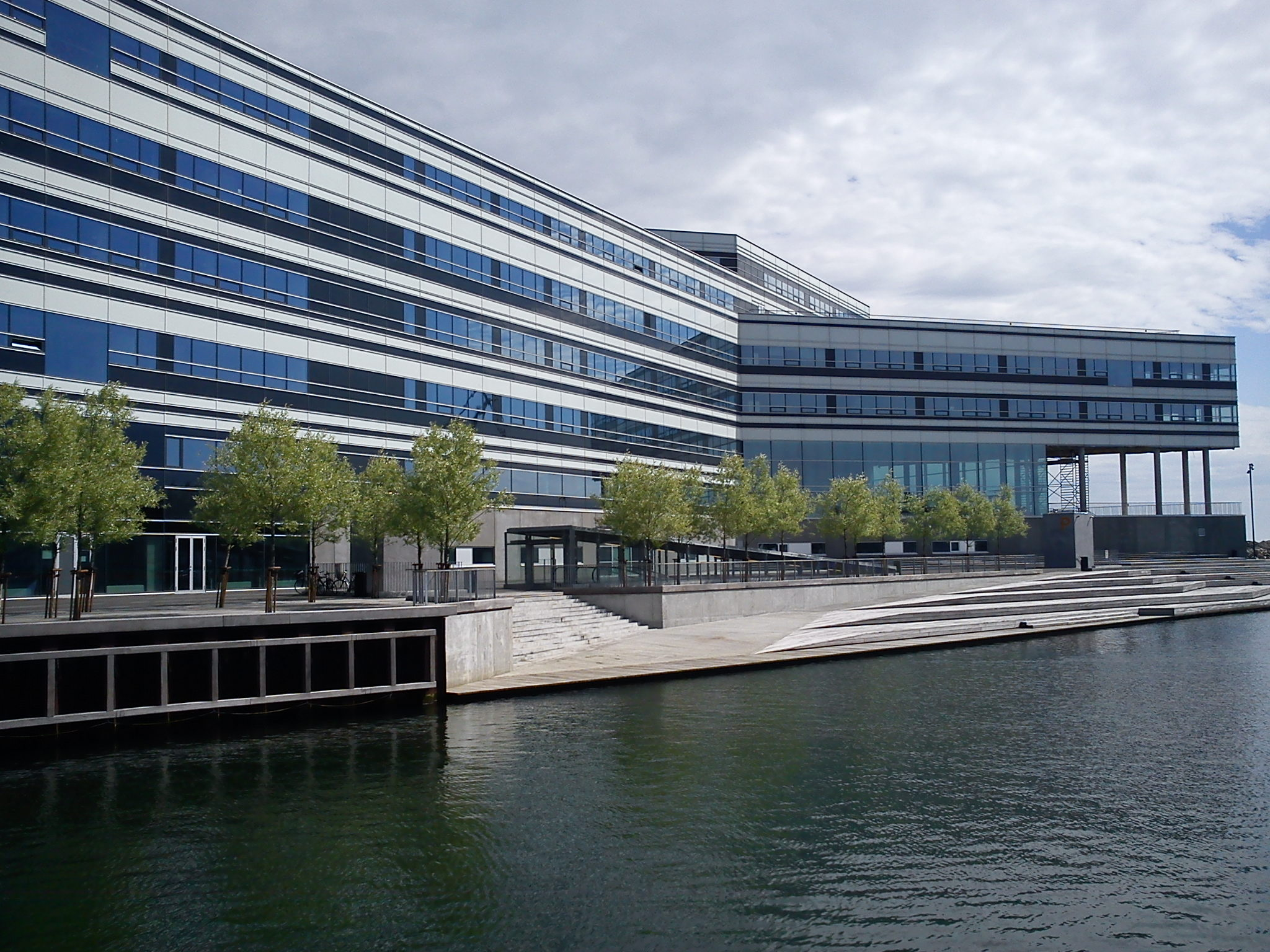
- Navitas in Aarhus
- Type: Marine and Technical Engineering
- Established: 1896; 129 years ago
- Rector: Anders Hanberg Sørensen (2015)
- Students: App. 1000
- Location: Aarhus, Denmark; 56.158694°N 10.215436°E
- Campus: Navitas
- Affiliations: AU Engineering, INCUBA Science Park, Business Academy Aarhus
- Website: http://www.aams.dk/en/

Aarhus School of Marine and Technical Engineering (Danish: Aarhus Maskinmesterskole or AAMS) is a school of higher education in Aarhus, Denmark. The school is a self owning institution and offers bachelor's degree in marine and technical engineering - with electives such as marine engineering and automation, energy and technology.

In the summer of 2014, the school took residence in the new Navitas building at Aarhus Docklands and initiated a cooperative programme with Business Academy Aarhus, offering Academy Profession Degrees in Automotive Technology (Danish: autoteknolog) and Automation Engineering (Danish: automationsteknolog). The Navitas building also includes a department of INCUBA Science Park and AU Engineering.

Aarhus School of Marine and Technical Engineering is subordinated the Danish Ministry of Science, Technology and Innovation. In 1968 it became a self-owning institution with an independent board of directors which includes representatives of the student body and faculty and it is now the largest school of marine and technical engineering in Denmark, with app. 1.000 students as of 2016.

== Programmes ==
The Marine Engineering programme focus on practical and theoretical skills necessary to comply with international qualification standards for crews on ships operating internationally. The Energy Programme is taught in English with participation of Danish and English students. The automation programme focus on automation technology and machine technique. The Project Management programme teaches the role of a project manager and project management tools useful for Technical Engineering projects.

Aarhus School of Marine and Technical Engineering also offer a one term elective course taught in English for both Danish and international students. The course is called Energy – Technology and Management. In this course, Danish and international students work and study together on subjects related to both conventional and “green” energy supply. The course is 30 ECTS. The course consists of two parts, each part is 15 ECTS and can be taken separately. The course is offered every semester – spring and autumn.
