= Navitas Park =

Navitas
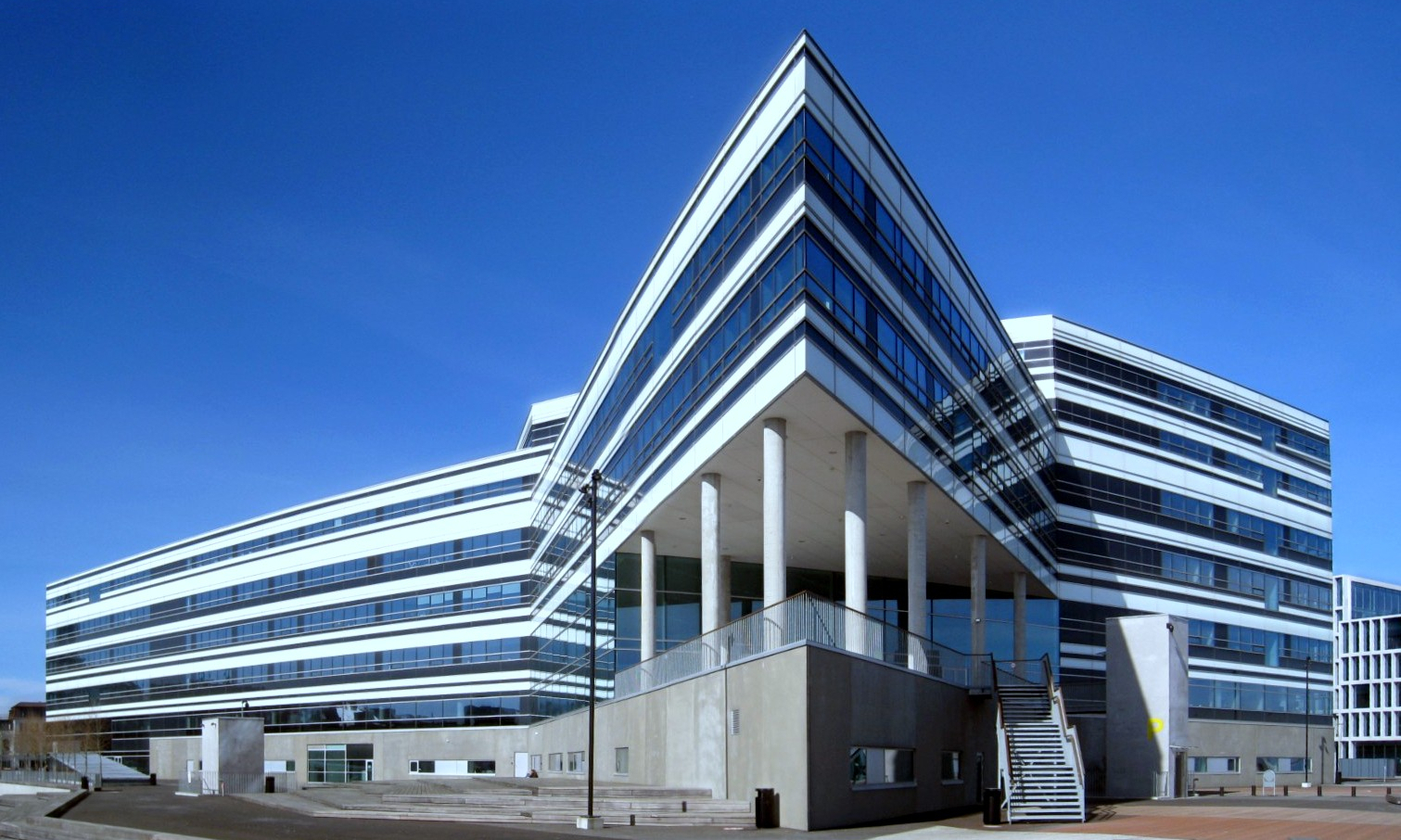
- Facade of Navitas
- Interactive map of the Navitas area

General information
- Type: Research Center
- Location: Aarhus, Denmark
- Coordinates: 56.1586°N 10.2155°E
- Completed: 2014
- Owner: INCUBA; AU Engineering; AAMS

Design and construction
- Architect: Kjær & Richter

Navitas (or Navitas Park) is a building in the city of Aarhus, Denmark, located in the Docklands neighborhood in the Midtbyen district. Navitas is owned by the research park INCUBA Science Park, the Aarhus University School of Engineering and the Aarhus School of Marine and Technical Engineering. The three institutions together operate a consortium that maintains the facilities and together they inhabit the building.

== History ==
Navitas Park was built in response to a growing student population and the need to consolidate educational institutions. The Port of Aarhus has built large new facilities leaving the old industrial sites open for redevelopment. In the 2000s a contest was opened for bidding to establish new facilities for AU Engineering and the Aarhus School of Marine and Technical Engineering while providing additional space for INCUBA Science Park. In 2010 E. Pihl & Søn and architect firm Kjaer & Richter won the contest and in 2014 the building was completed.

== Architecture ==
Navitas was built by the construction company E. Pihl & Søn by designs of the architecture firms Kjaer & Richter and Christensen & Co Arkitekter, landscape architect Marianne Levinsen and consultants ALECTIA. Rambøll functioned as the overall project manager, coordinating efforts between the different companies involved. Navitas Park is part of a wider effort to revitalize the former industrial port facilities of the Port of Aarhus. It overlooks the Bay of Aarhus from a prominent position on the harbor-front. The building is shaped like a star with four pointed wings, carried by columns at the ends. The building is in 8 floors and is clad in white and blue glass. The basement contains a public parking garage with 450 parking spots, operated by the city of Aarhus.

The building was the largest low energy building in Denmark when it was constructed and feature a number of environmental solutions that gives it in the highest Danish house energy rating. Structural elements, energy systems and cooling and ventilation systems are exposed and accessible for the scientists and researchers who work in the building. On the roof 1280 solar cells generate electricity for the building while the bottom floors are cooled by seawater. The building is managed by an IT system that constantly regulates temperature and lighting.
