= Isbjerget =

Coordinates: 56.1650°N 10.2300°E

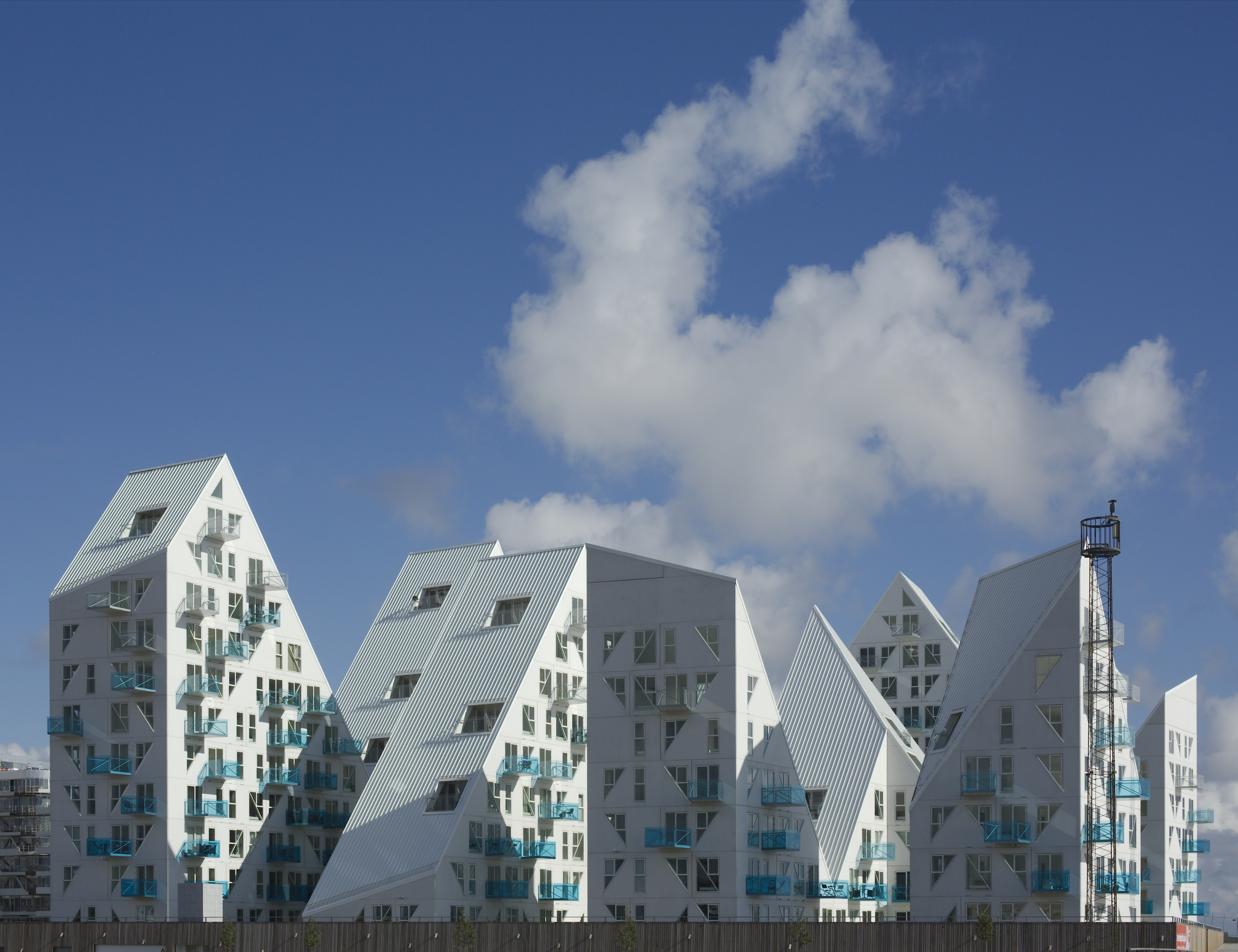
- Isbjerget from the seaside
- Interactive map of the Isbjerget area

General information
- Architectural style: Modernist architecture
- Location: Aarhus, Denmark
- Construction started: 2010
- Completed: 2013

Technical details
- Floor count: 10

Design and construction
- Architects: CEBRA; JDS Architects; Louis Paillard; SeARCH
- Developer: NCC AB

Isbjerget (lit. 'The Iceberg') is a residential building in the Aarhus Docklands neighborhood in Aarhus, Denmark. It is situated on the waterfront on Mariane Thomsens Gade and was finished in 2013 after three years of development. The building was designed by four architectural firms, the Danish CEBRA and JDS Architects, French Louis Paillard and Dutch SeARCH, and was funded by the Danish pension fund PensionDanmark.

Isbjerget was the first project to be completed on the former industrial port area, which is being developed into a new residential and commercial neighborhood after the Port of Aarhus was moved to new facilities to the south of the city center. The building complex consists of four buildings with 208 apartments between 55 m^{2} (590 sq ft) and 200 m^{2} (2,200 sq ft) both rented and owned. The apartments are either in two stories, double in height or with shifted floor plans, catering to different needs.

The buildings are up to ten floors tall but vary in height, with the shortest building closest to the waterfront and the tallest further back. The complex is designed and modeled after floating icebergs in the north Atlantic, both in shape and color. The buildings are divided and crisscrossed into smaller units with steep crooked roofs, to ensure that all inhabitants have ideal views of the sea. Visually, the buildings display sharp triangular edges and shifting, irregular facades. The buildings are clad in white terrazzo and have balconies made of blue glass.

== Awards ==
- In 2013, Isbjerget was awarded the Best Residential Development award at the French architects conference MIPIM.
- In 2015 it was given the Best Housing award by the ArchDaily website, which caters to architects and designers.

== Gallery ==
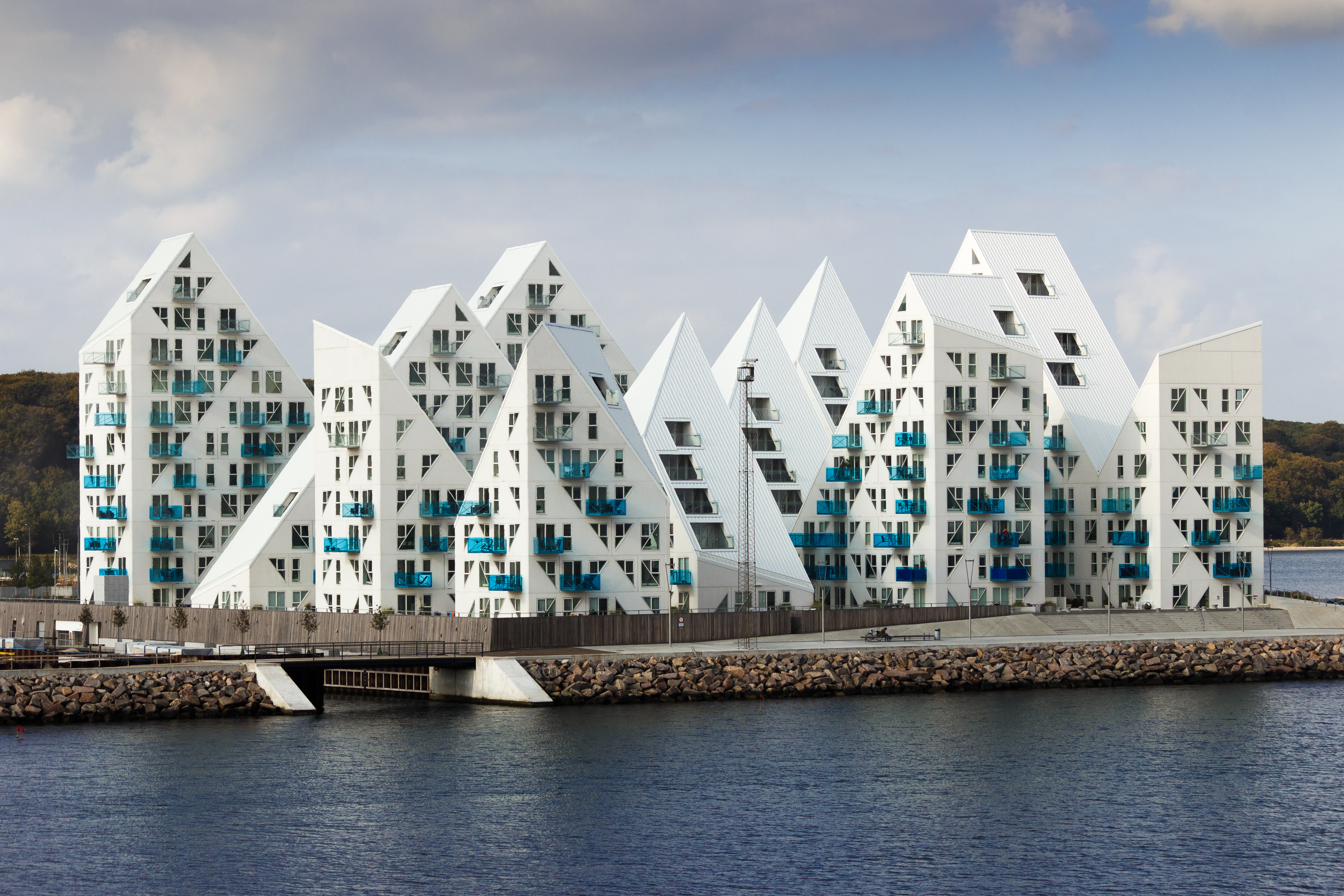
View from passing Mols-Linien ferry

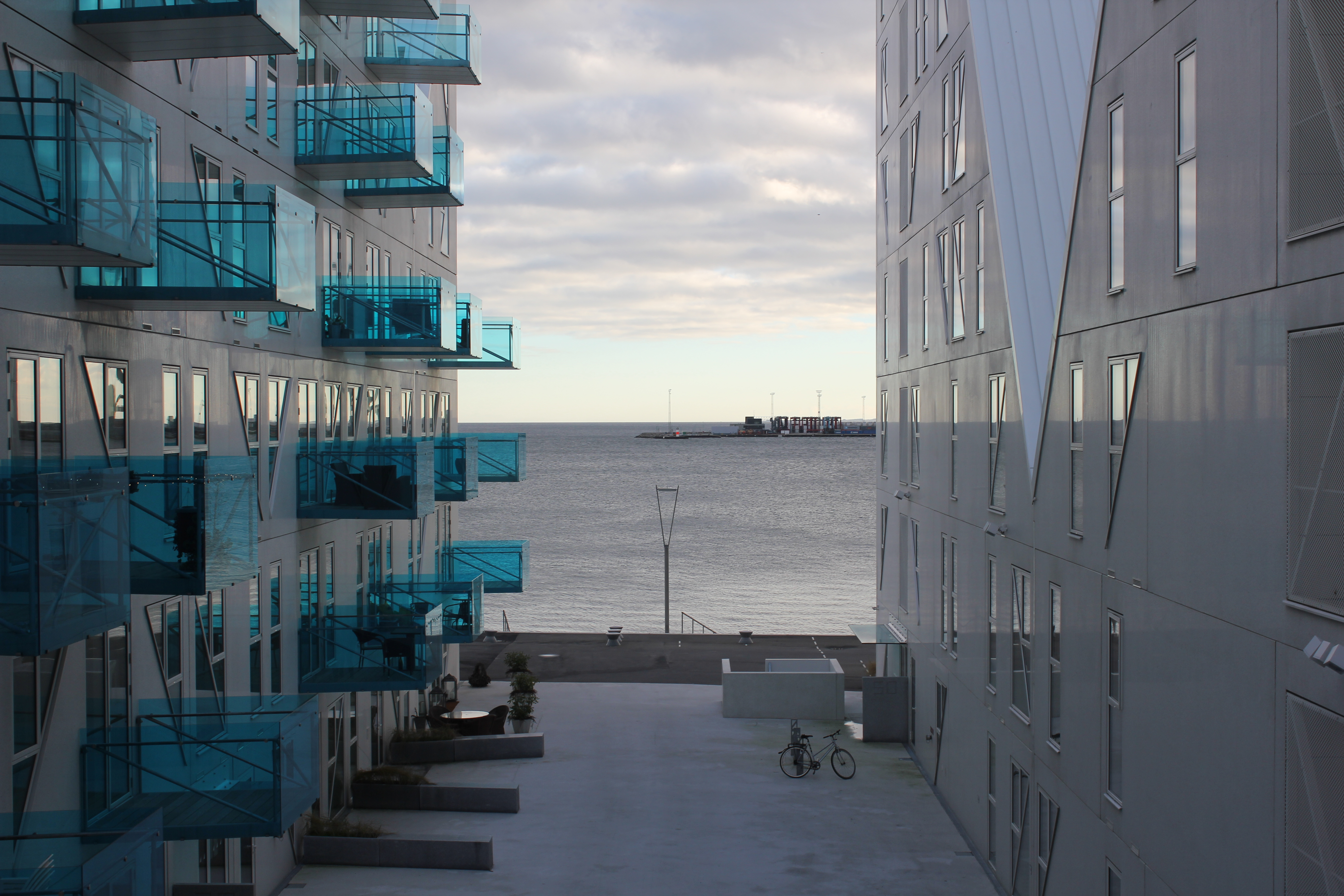

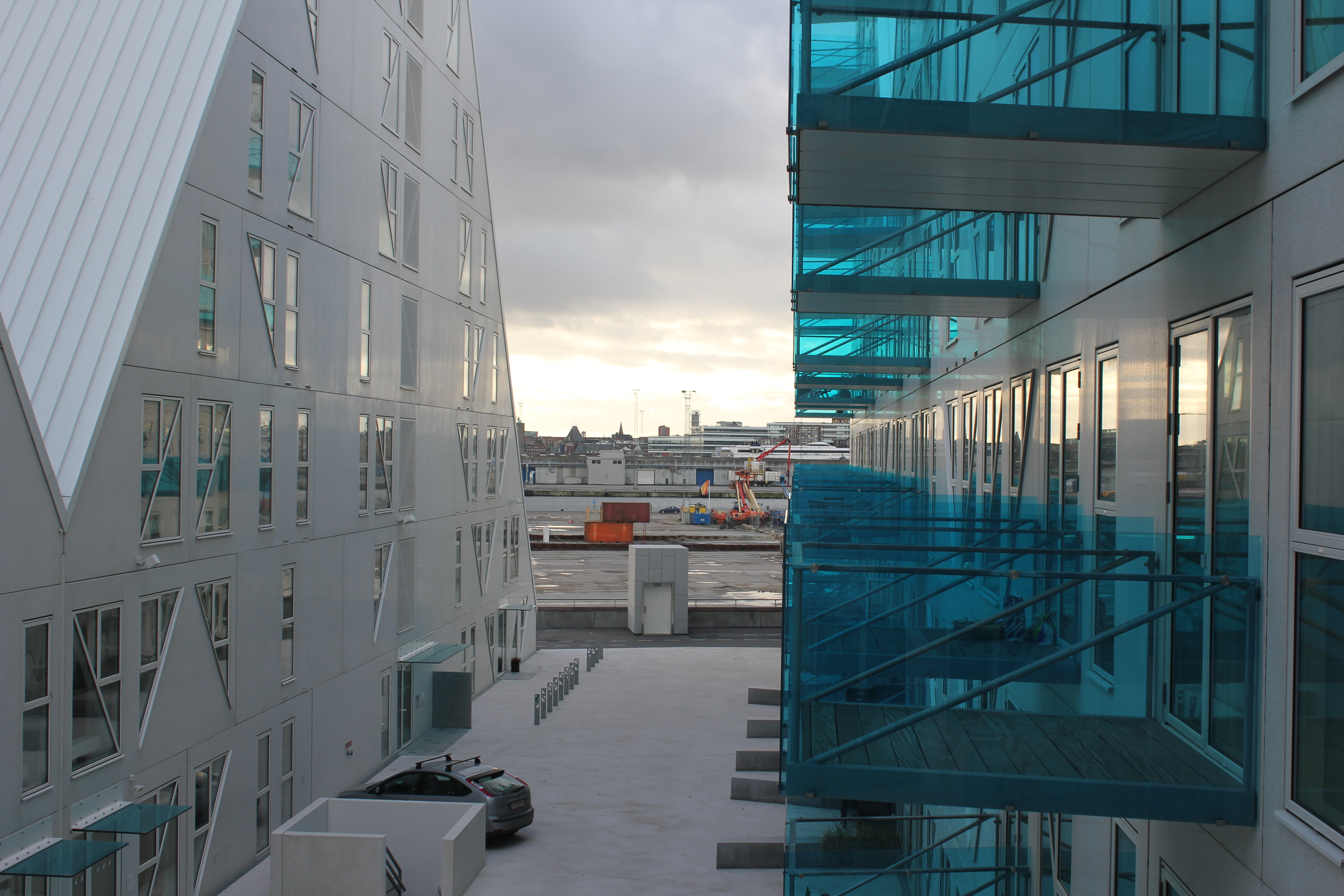

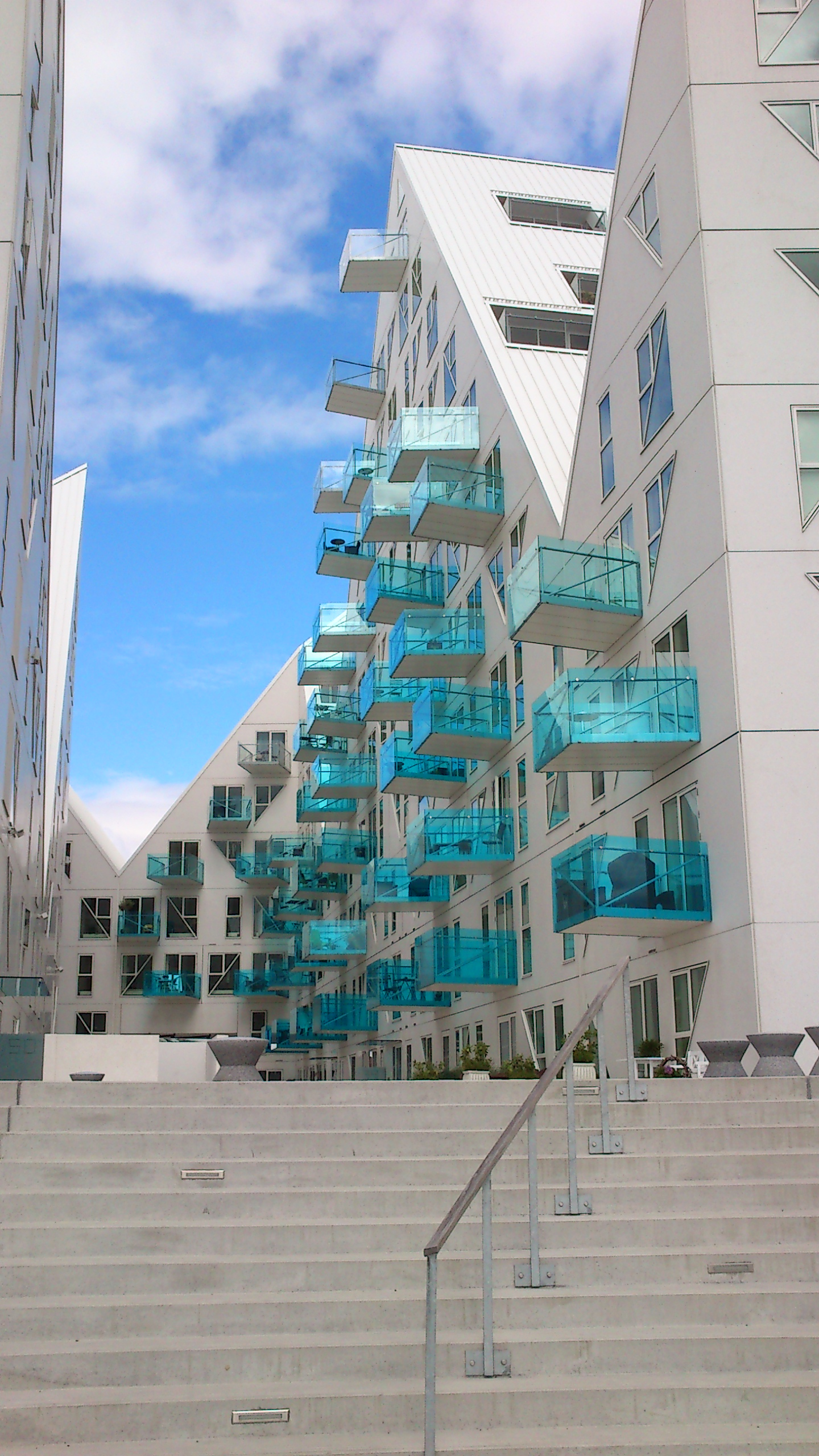

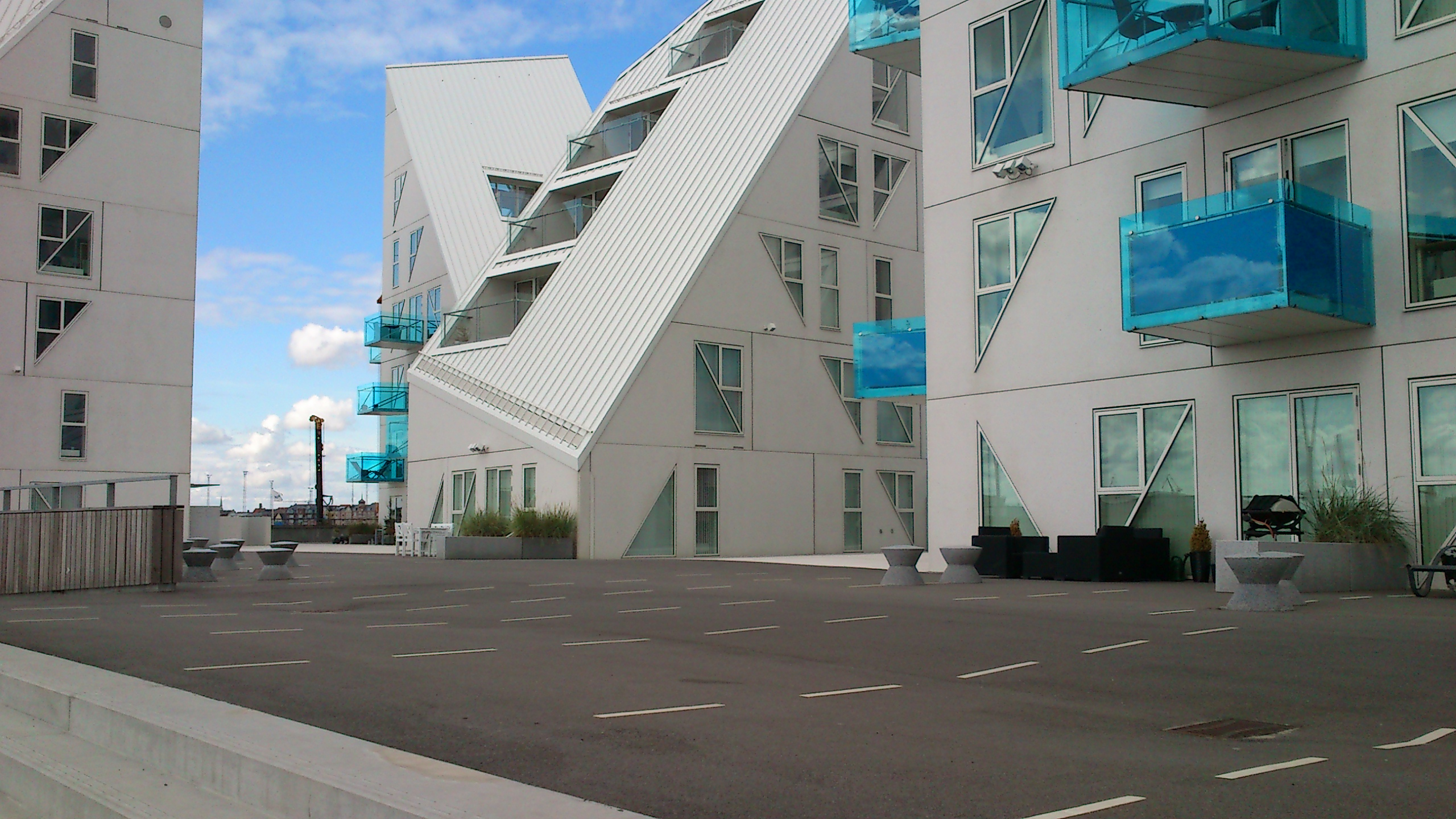
