= List of ports in Denmark =

This list of ports in Denmark lists major ports in Denmark by cargo volume in 2014 as defined by Statistics Denmark.

Cargo refers to all transferred units including freight cargo, bulk cargo, containers, vehicles and passengers. Freight cargo includes bulk cargo and containers.

Name	All cargo / tonnes	Freight cargo / tonnes	Containers / tonnes
Port of Fredericia	9,037.000	9,037.000	833.000
Port of Aarhus	7,614.000	7,438.000	2,841.000
Statoil-havnen	7,123.000	7,123.000	0
Rødby Færgehavn	6,296.000	0	0
Port of Copenhagen	6,146.000	5,963.000	1,389.000
Port of Esbjerg	4,565.000	4,493.000	222.000
Port of Elsinore	4,422.000	0	0
Port of Aalborg	2,557.000	2,557.000	357.000
Port of Odense	2,381.000	2,381.000	0
Port of Frederikshavn	2,249.000	0	0
Port of Aalborg Portland	2,011.000	2,011.000	0
Port of Enstedværkets	1,981.000	1,981.000	0
Port of Gedser	1,638.000	0	0
Port of Køge	1.612.000	1,182.000	0
Port of Aabenraa	1,542.000	1,542.000	0
Port of Hirtshals	1,444.000	0	0
Port of Rønne	1,397.000	871.000	0
Port of Stigsnæsværket	1,356.000	1,356.000	0
Port of Grenaa	1,307.000	711.000	0
Port of Kolding	1,263.000	1,263.000	0
Port of Kalundborg	1,122.000	1,081.000	55.000
Port of Avedøreværket	1,094.000	1,094.000	0
Port of Randers	1,083.000	1,083.000	0
Port of Stålvalseværket	910.000	910.000	0
Port of Thyborøn	891.000	799.000	0
Port of Asnæsværket	495.000	495.000	0
Port of Vejle	710.000	710.000	0
Studstrupværkets Havn	665.000	665.000	0
Skætti Facktinory	453.000	453.000	0
Gulf-havnen	0	0	0
Port of Korsør	0	0	0
Port of Ebeltoft	0	0	0
