= INCUBA Science Park =

Science park in Aarhus, Denmark

Coordinates: 56.11369°N 10.102471°E

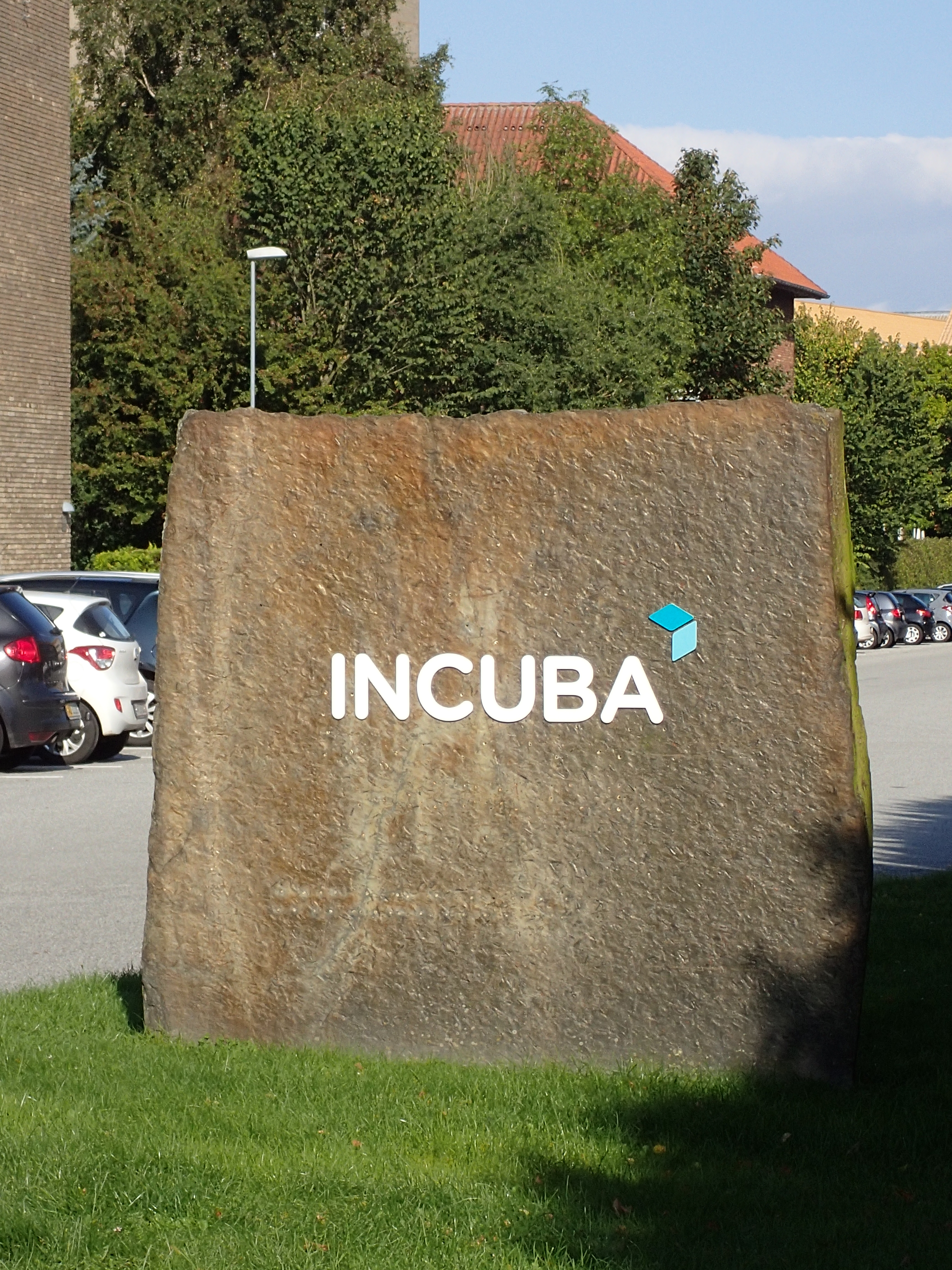
- INCUBA logo stone
- Interactive map of INCUBA Science Park
- Location: Aarhus University, Katrinebjerg, Skejby and Navitas Park.
- Opening date: 2007
- Architect: C. F. Møller Architects and Kjaer & Richter
- Website: INCUBA Science Park

INCUBA Science Park is a research park in Aarhus, Denmark with four departments in Skejby, Katrinebjerg, Aarhus University and Aarhus Docklands.

INCUBA was created as a merger of three former research institutions in 2007, and is an amalgamation of "Innovation Network Centre for University and Businesses of Aarhus" and the primary goals of the institution are to strengthen cooperation between research institutions and companies with consultancy and by raising capital for projects. The park is the first of its kind in Denmark.

== History ==
In 1984, Aarhus Municipality started planning a research park in Aarhus with the intention of helping scientists and researchers to start their own companies. The idea was new and no similar project existed in Denmark at the time. In 1985, a group of interested companies, organizations and institutions founded the Organization "Foreningen Forskerparken i Aarhus" with funding from various foundations and The Danish Board of Technology.

In 1986, the company "Forskerpark Aarhus A/S" was formed and capital raised by selling shares to local businesses. Construction began later that year and by 1987 the first 2,500 m^{2} was ready for the first tenants. By 1988, the building was nearing full capacity and the first of many expansions in the following years was initiated. In 1989, an expansion of 4.500 m^{2} drawn by C. F. Møller Architects was completed, and in 1997 the final building on Gustav Wieds Vej at Aarhus University's central campus was added, bringing it to a total of 11,500 m^{2}. In 2002, Forskerpark Aarhus started construction on the first biomedical research center, Research Park Skejby, at Skejby Sygehus and in 2004, the center opened 3,600 m^{2}. In 2006, 10,000 m^{2} focussing on information technology, opened in Katrinebjerg.

In 2007, Forskerpark Aarhus, Forskerpark Skejby og IT-Huset Katrinebjerg combined forces and created INCUBA Science Park. The same year construction began on Navitas Park at Aarhus Docklands, a new department of 10,000 m^{2} focusing on energy technology, and finished in 2014.

In late 2024, INCUBA opened INCUBA Next, a 22,000-square-meter innovation tower in Aarhus spanning 18 floors. The building is an addition to existing premises at Katrinebjerg Aarhus. The facility is designed to support the growth of technology companies by providing a large-scale environment for collaboration between startups, research institutions, and established businesses. The launch marked a significant milestone for the organisation’s role in strengthening the regional tech ecosystem as a leading technology and innovation hub in Denmark.

== Departments ==
Since Navitas Park was finished in 2014, INCUBA Science Park includes these four departments:

- AU Centre for Entrepreneurship and Innovation (AU CEI) at Aarhus University campus, servicing and bridging the gap between all the academic fields of the university and the business world.
- INCUBA - Skejby, focussing on biomedicine and healthcare.
- INCUBA & INCUBA NEXT - Katrinebjerg, focussing on information and communication technology.
- INCUBA - Navitas or Navitas Park (NSI) at Aarhus Docklands, focussing on energy technology and clean-tech.

The four departments of INCUBA Science Park host more than 120 companies. The department in Skejby is currently under expansion.

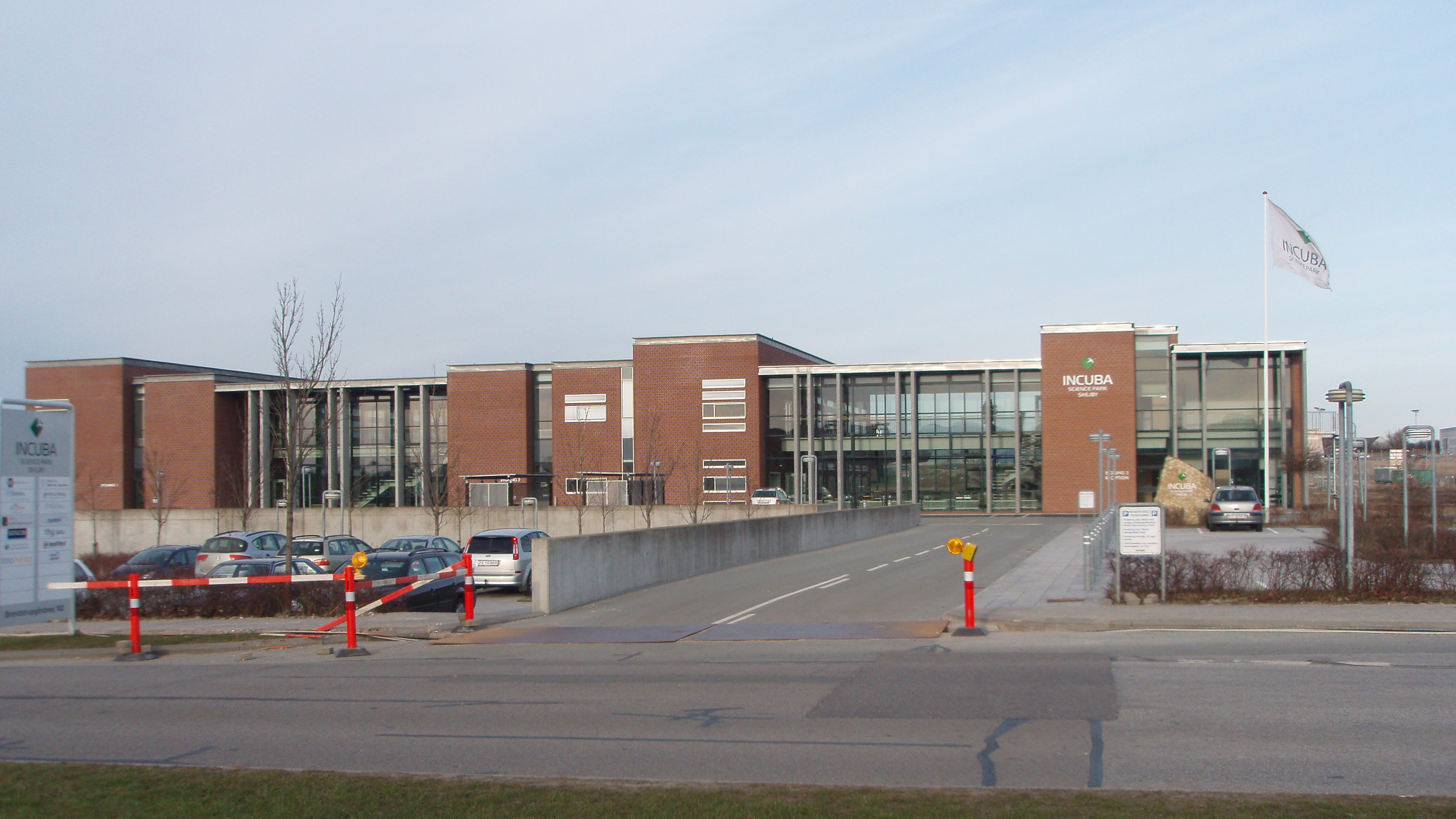
INCUBA Science Park department in Skejby

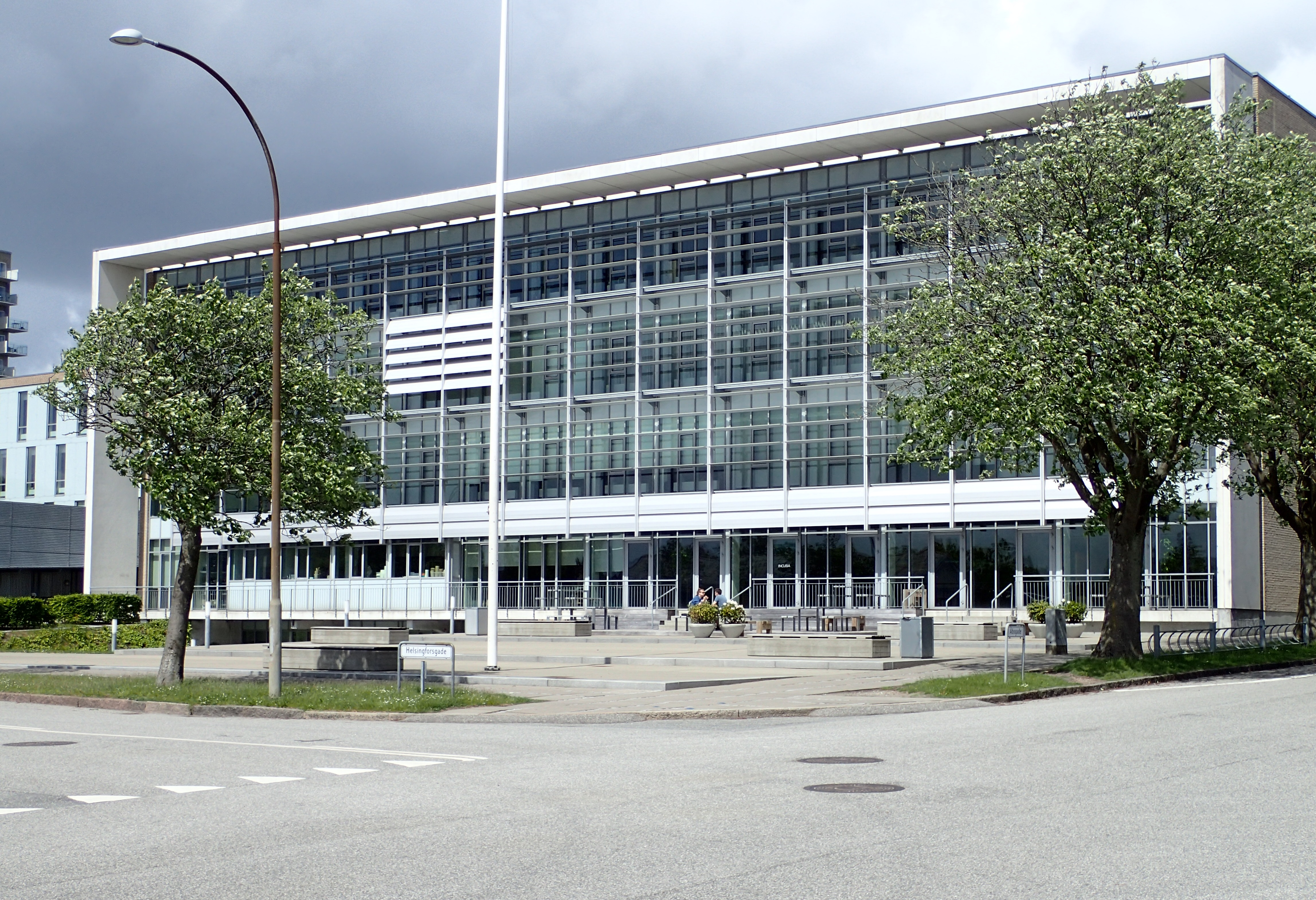
INCUBA Katrinebjerg

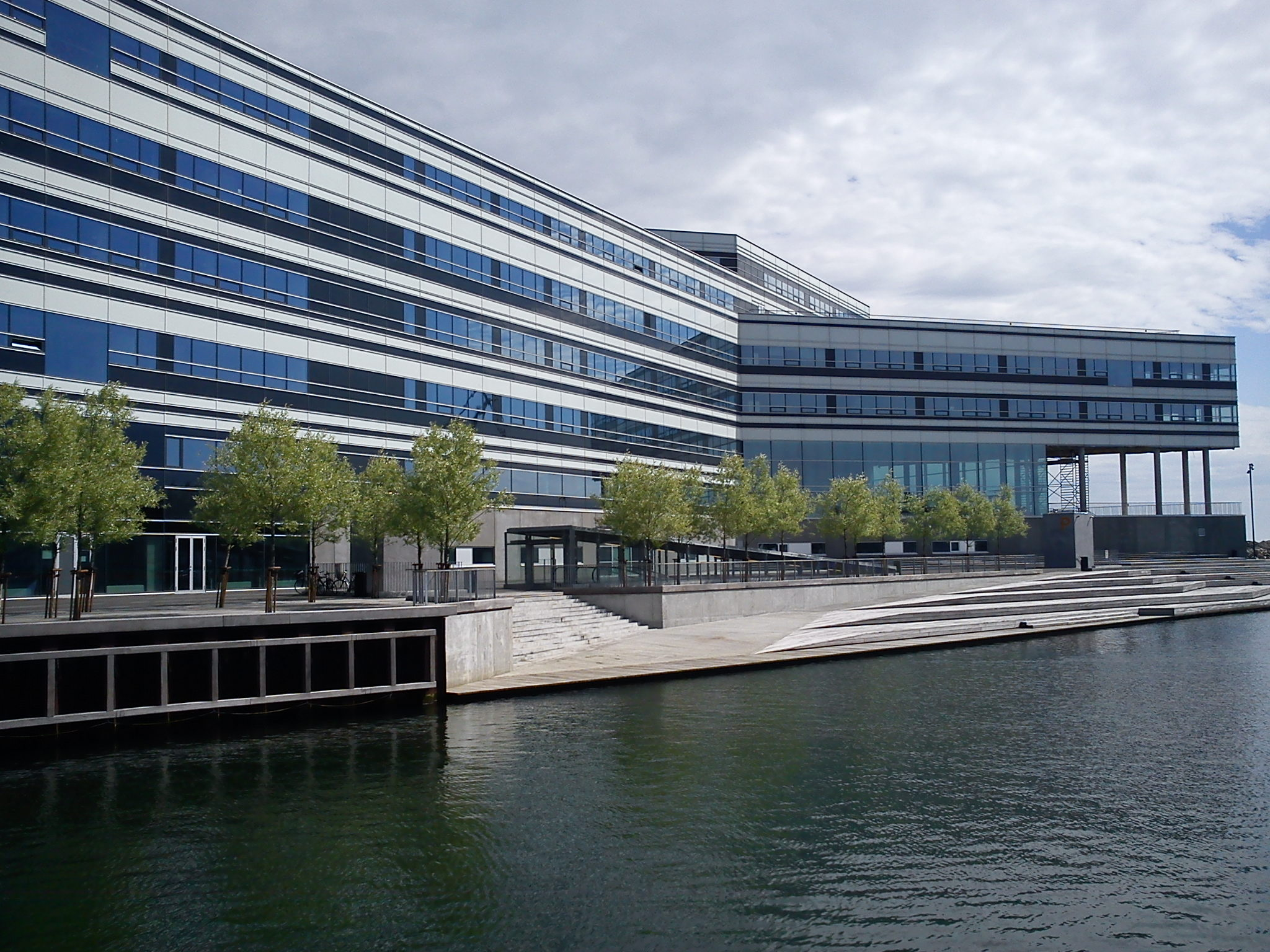
Navitas Park (NSI)

== Architecture ==
All buildings have been designed by C. F. Møller Architects, except for Navitas Park, designed by Kjaer & Richter.

== See also ==
- AU Engineering

== Sources ==
- "Historisk forløb 1984 - 2008" (PDF). INCUBA Science Park.
