= Marselisborg Yacht Harbour =

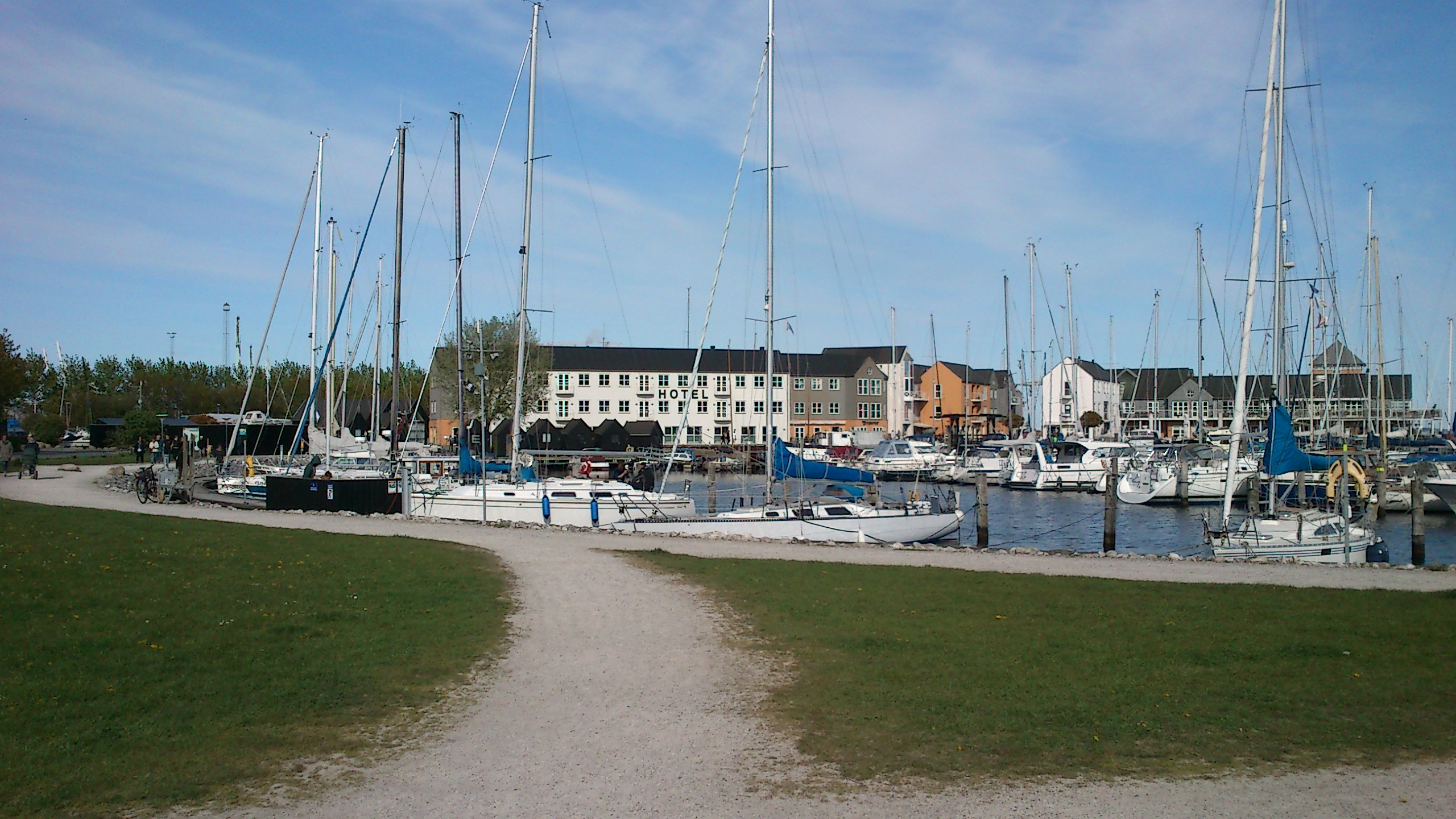
- Marselisborg Yacht Harbour
- Click on the map for a fullscreen view

Location
- Country: Denmark
- Location: Aarhus
- Coordinates: 56.138°N 10.215°E

Details
- Opened: 1991
- Operated by: Fonden Marselisborg Havn
- Owned by: Self

Statistics
- Website; Official website

Marselisborg Yacht Harbour (Danish: Marselisborg Lystbådehavn) is a marina located in Aarhus, Denmark. The marina has been in operation since 1991 and is situated adjacent to Tangkrogen on the south side of the Port of Aarhus, It includes restaurants, cafes, a hotel and a number of sports clubs and sailing schools.

== History ==
The background for the yacht harbor was the expansion of the Port of Aarhus in 1981–83. The construction of the new port facilities required storing a large amount of dirt which created a lagoon by Tangkrogen. Boat owners who were waiting for a spot at one of the marinas in Arhus, or who couldn't afford one, started storing their boats and ships in the lagoon. Eventually, space became sparse and construction had reached a point where the lagoon would have to be abandoned. Seeking the establishment of a real harbor, local sailors formed the organization Marselisborg Havneforening on 26 May 1982. The initial board consisted of 4 members elected by members of the organization with a fifth being appointed by Aarhus Municipality.

The new organization contacted the city council and started negotiations. On 24 Nov 1982 the Aarhus city council voted to stop filling in the lagoon and establish a committee to establish a new yacht harbor. AFter lengthy discussions with al involved parties, on 30 April 1984 Marselisborg Havneforening presented their final proposal to the city council. the harbor was to be financed partly by selling spots at the berths. On 19 June 1985 the city council sent the proposal to the final public hearing and on 20 November 1985 a construction company began removing construction debris and excess earth. Almost 6 years later in June 1991, Marselisborg Yacht Harbour was inaugurated.

== Ownership ==
Marselisborg Yacht Harbour is owned and operated by the self-owning foundation Fonden Marselisborg Havn. The foundation was established by Aarhus Municipality in 1987 for the purpose of operating the marina. The initial budget was 700.000 DKK with the rest to be covered by future operating income. The board consists of 5-7 members of which one is selected by Aarhus Municipality and the rest are elected by the place-owners in the harbor.

== Gallery ==
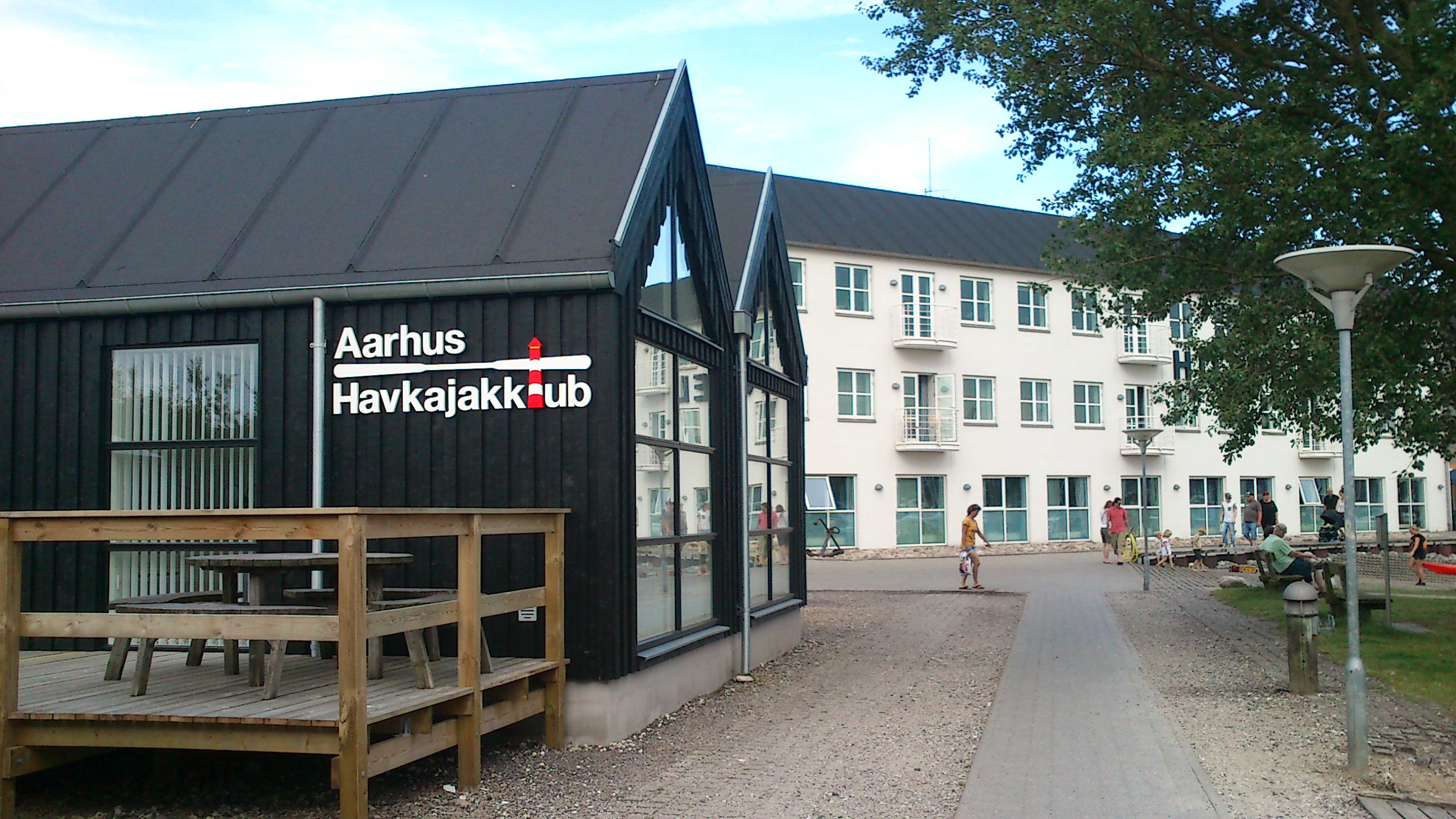
Home of the Sea Kayak Club

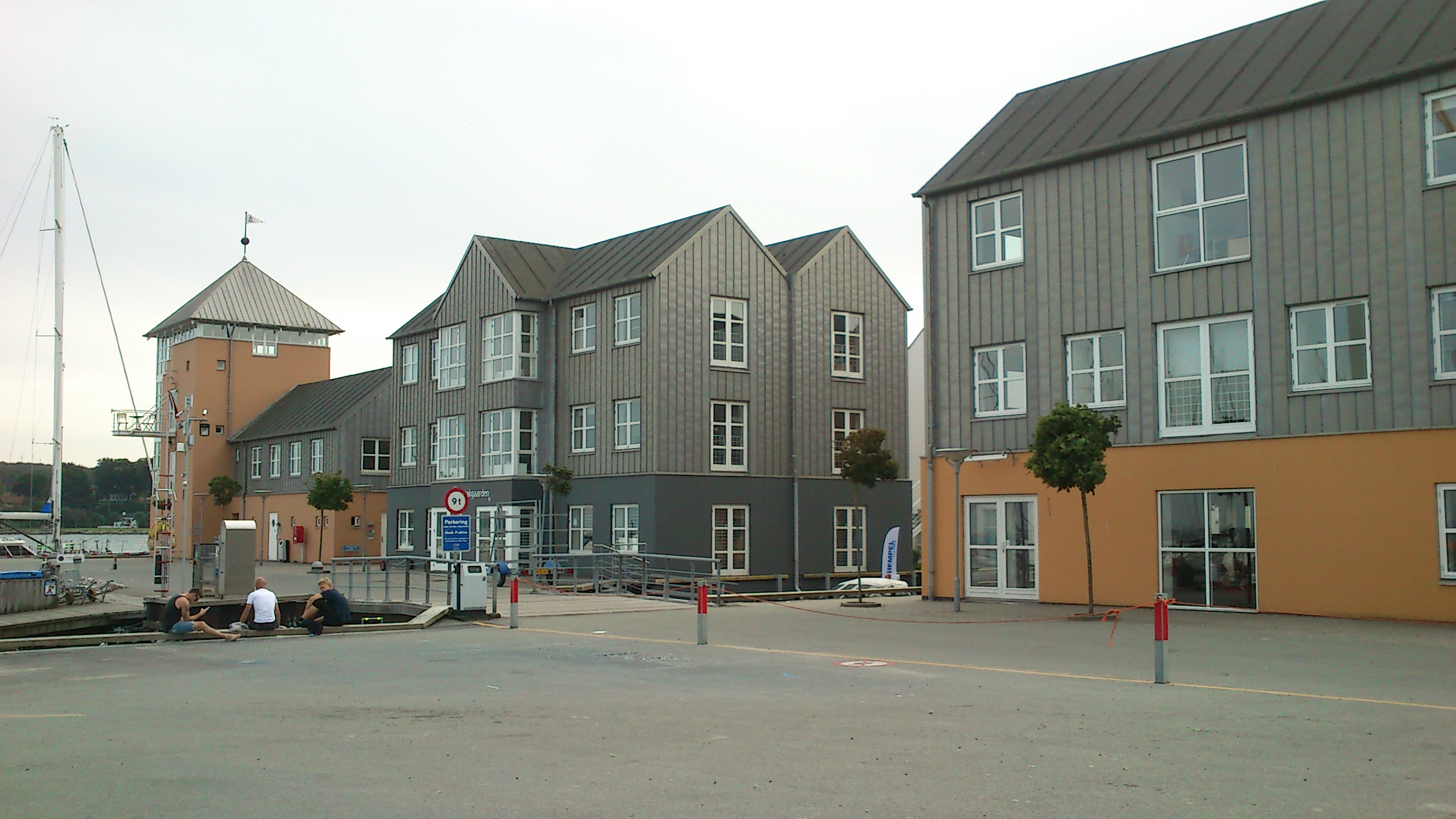
Main buildings with offices and stores

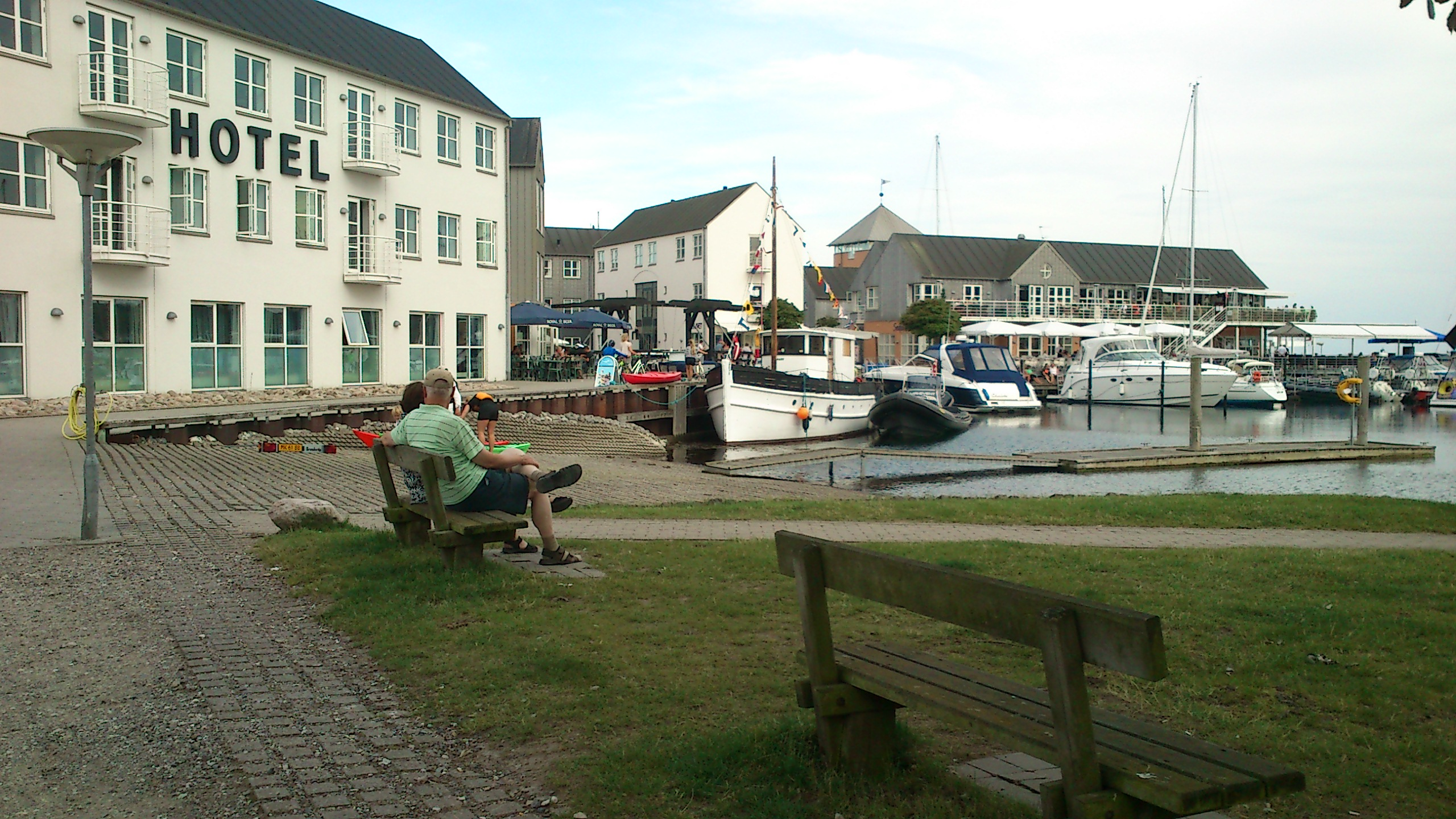
Hotel

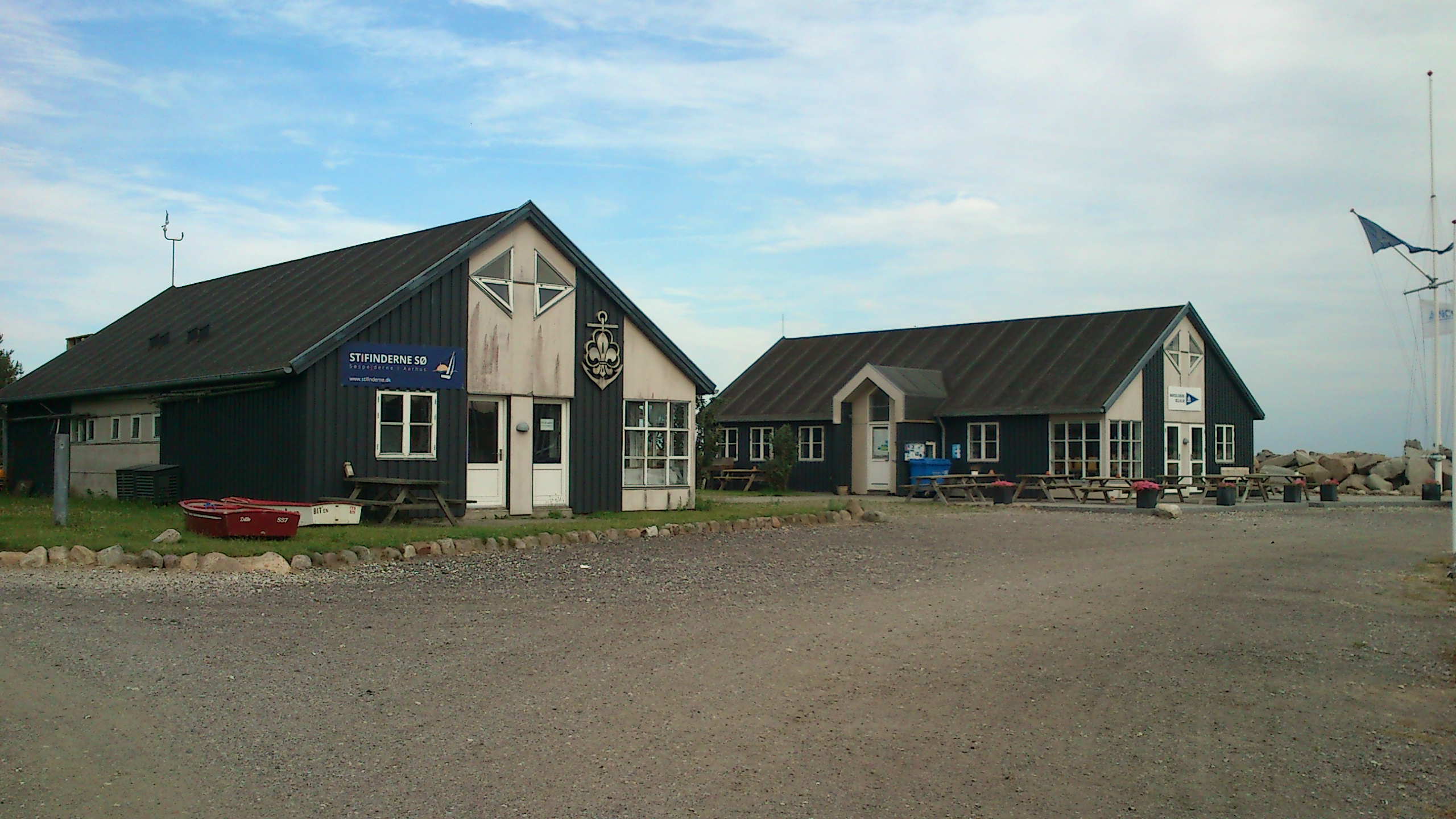
Club houses for sports clubs and event companies

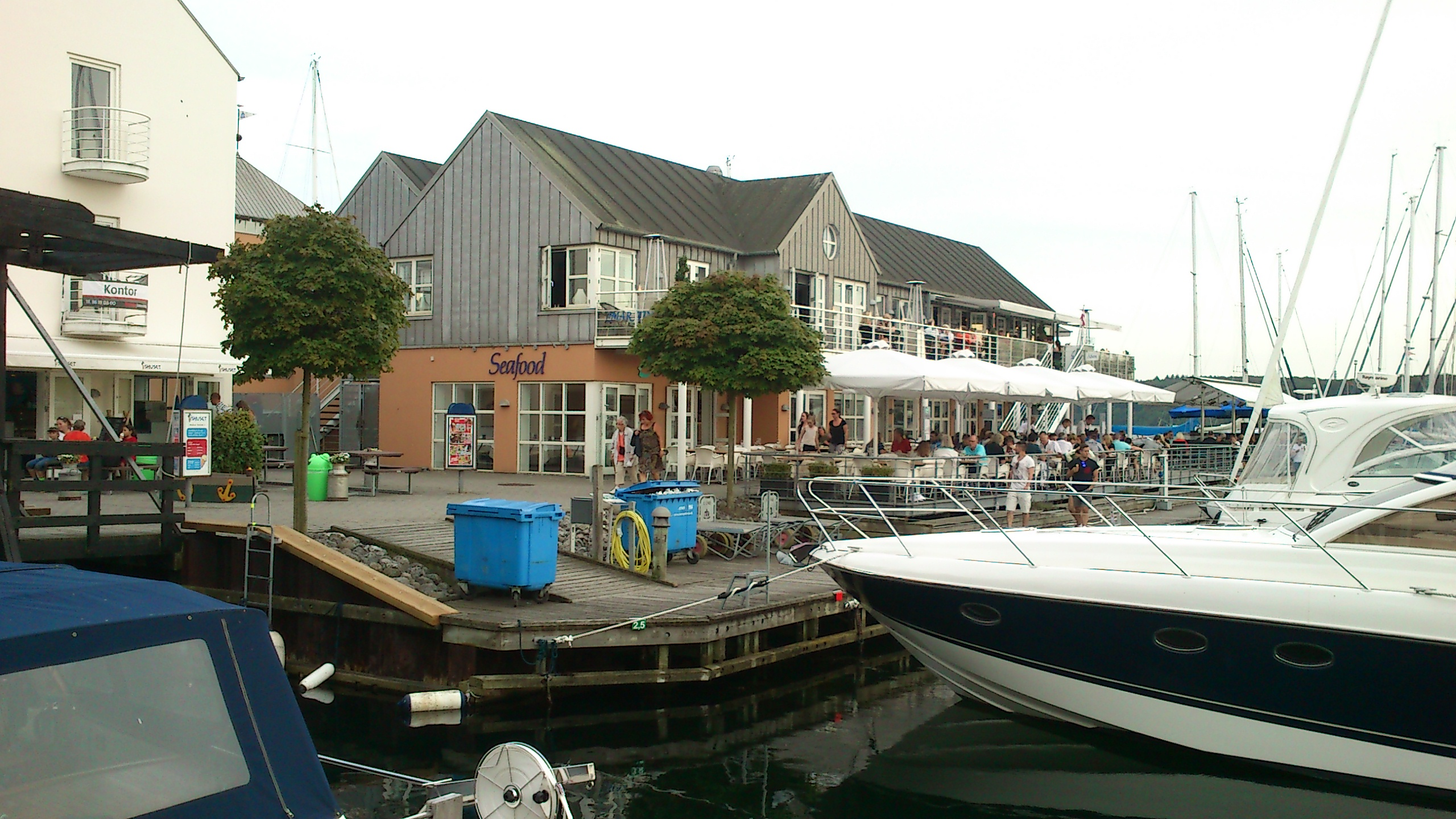
One of several restaurants

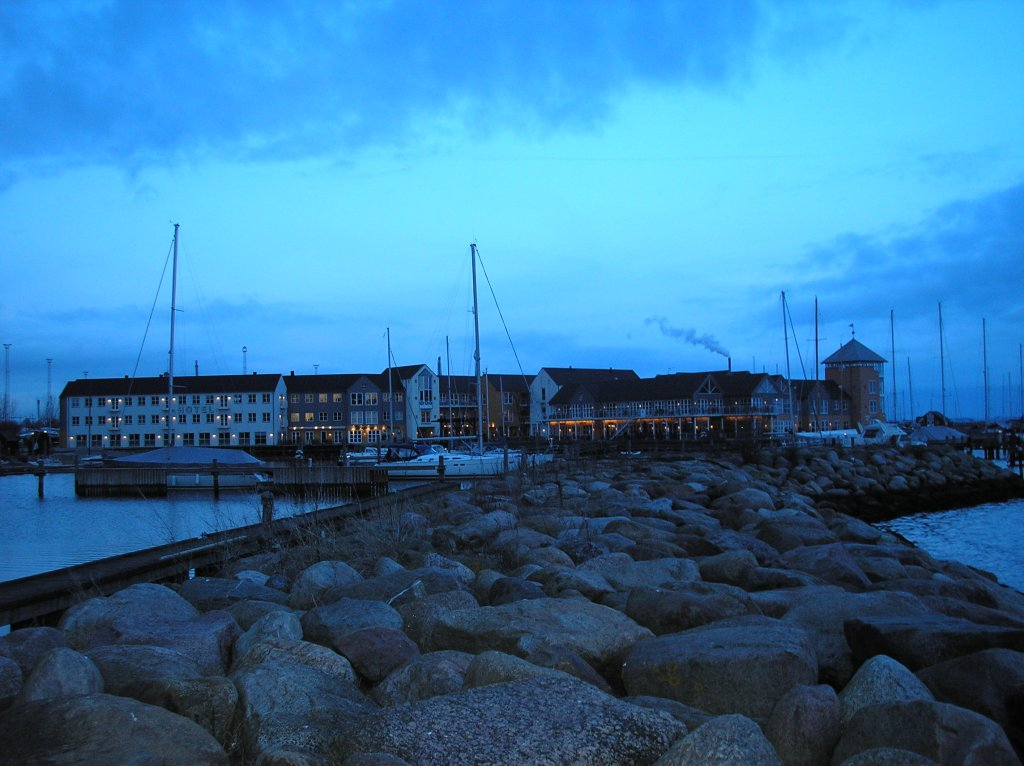
The "Harbor town" at night
