= AU Engineering =

AU Engineering (Danish: Ingeniørområdet ved Aarhus Universitet) is an umbrella organisation of engineering under Aarhus University. It was established in 2011 and AU Engineering is anchored in four departments: Department of Civil and Architectural Engineering, Department of Mechanical and Production Engineering, Department of Biological and Chemical Engineering and Department of Electrical and Computer Engineering.

== Departments ==
Department of Civil and Architectural Engineering is located at Navitas Park at Aarhus Docklands. Navitas is also home to Aarhus School of Marine and Technical Engineering (AAMS). Department of Mechanical and Production Engineering, Department of Biological and Chemical Engineering and Department of Electrical and Computer Engineering is located at Campus Katrinebjerg in Aarhus N.

== Sources ==
- "AU Engineering". AU Engineering.
