= Port of Fredericia =

Fredericia
- Interactive map of Fredericia

Location
- Country: Denmark
- Location: Little Belt
- Coordinates: 55°33′N 9°45′E
- UN/LOCODE: DKFRC

Details
- No. of berths: 20
- Draft depth: 14.0 metres (45.9 ft)

Statistics
- Website https://www.adp-as.dk

The Port of Fredericia is a port facility located on Denmark's Little Belt, 45 km. WNW of Odense.

A multipurpose port, Fredericia handles breakbulk, dry bulk, containers and tanker traffic.
