= Aarhus Docklands =

Aarhus Docklands Aarhus Ø
- Neighbourhood
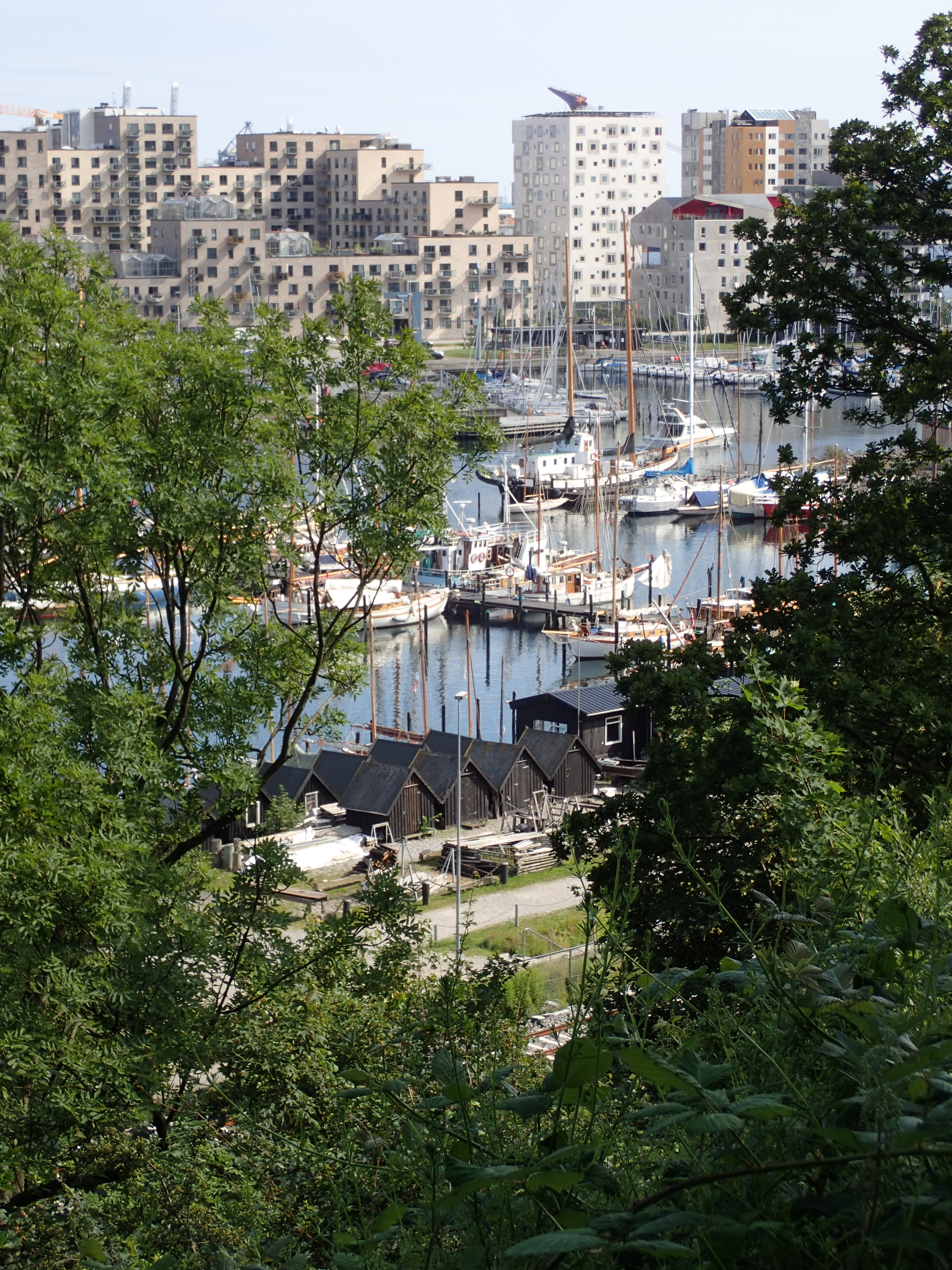
- View of Aarhus Docklands from Riis Skov (July 2017)

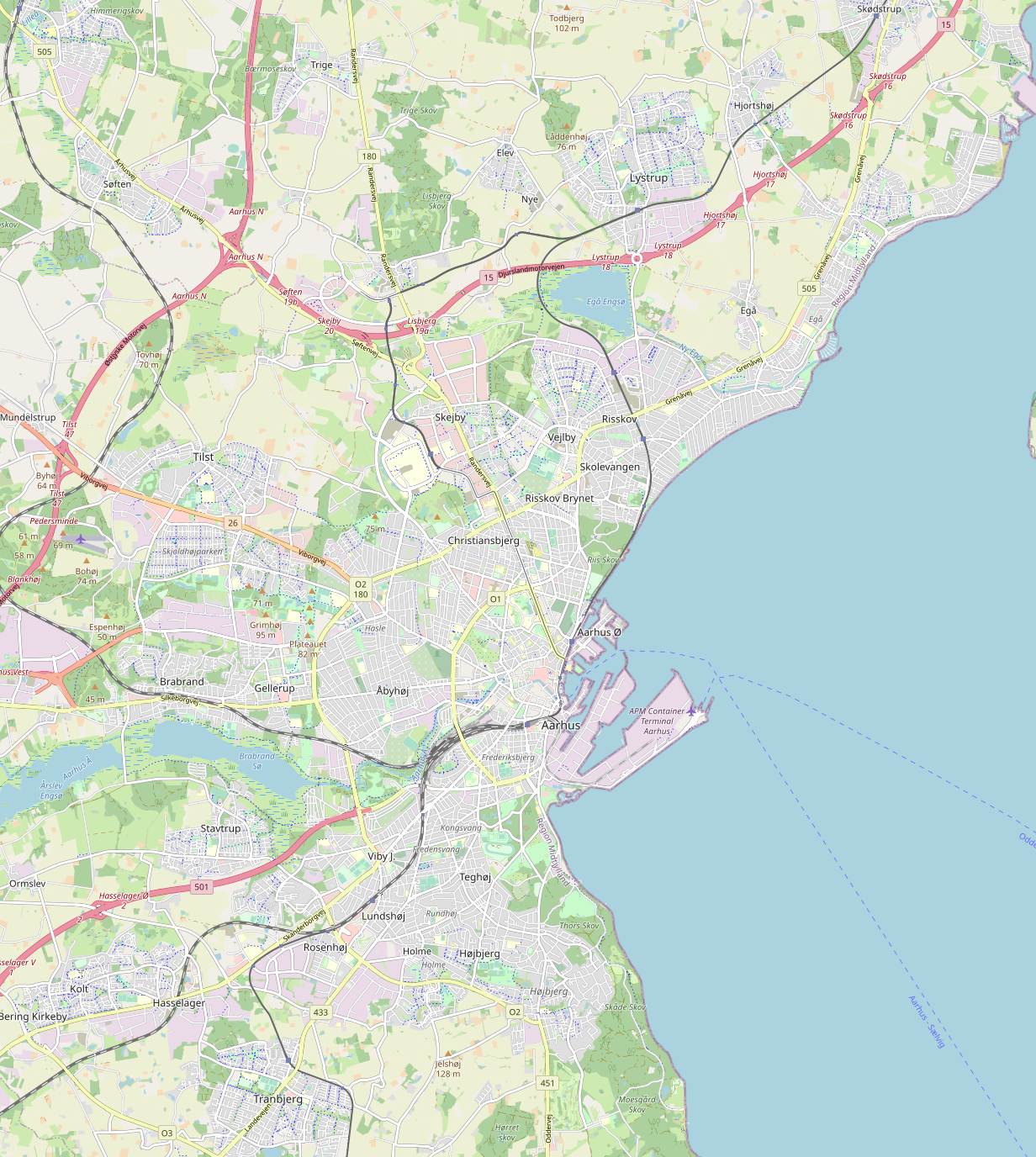
- Location within Aarhus
- Coordinates: 56.164°N 10.228°E
- Country: Denmark
- Regions of Denmark: Central Denmark Region
- Municipality: Aarhus Municipality
- District: Midtbyen
- Postal code: 8000 Aarhus C

Aarhus Docklands (Danish: Aarhus Ø) is a redeveloped neighbourhood in Aarhus, Denmark.

Construction of Aarhus Docklands began in 2008 and most buildings and construction was finished by 2018. The project converted the former container port, Nordhavn in the Port of Aarhus, to a new residential, educational, commercial and recreational area, consisting of high rise buildings of modern architectural designs, seaside promenades and a network of canals.

Fully developed, the Docklands neighbourhood is intended to sustain 10-12,000 residents and 10,000 jobs in an area equalling the size of Trøjborg, an adjacent neighbourhood. Aarhus Docklands offers a view of the Aarhus Bay and is located a short distance to Midtbyen.

Aarhus Docklands is part of the larger Peri-urban Harbour-areas (De Bynære Havnearealer) comprising nearly all of the old harbour district along the coastline. It is among the largest harbourfront development projects in Europe.

== Projects ==
The projects at Aarhus Docklands includes several notable architectural designs:

- Isbjerget (The Iceberg), by JDS Architects and CEBRA won the 2013 MIPIM property development Awards.
- Z house, by Bjarke Ingels Group.
- Grundfos Kollegiet, a dormitory financed by the Danish company of Grundfos.
- Navitas Park, a research centre of energy technology. Part of INCUBA Science Park, with education, engineering, innovation and entrepreneurship.
- Lighthouse (or Lighthouse*). A residential project, including the tallest tower in Denmark at 142 metres.

=== Lighthouse ===
Lighthouse
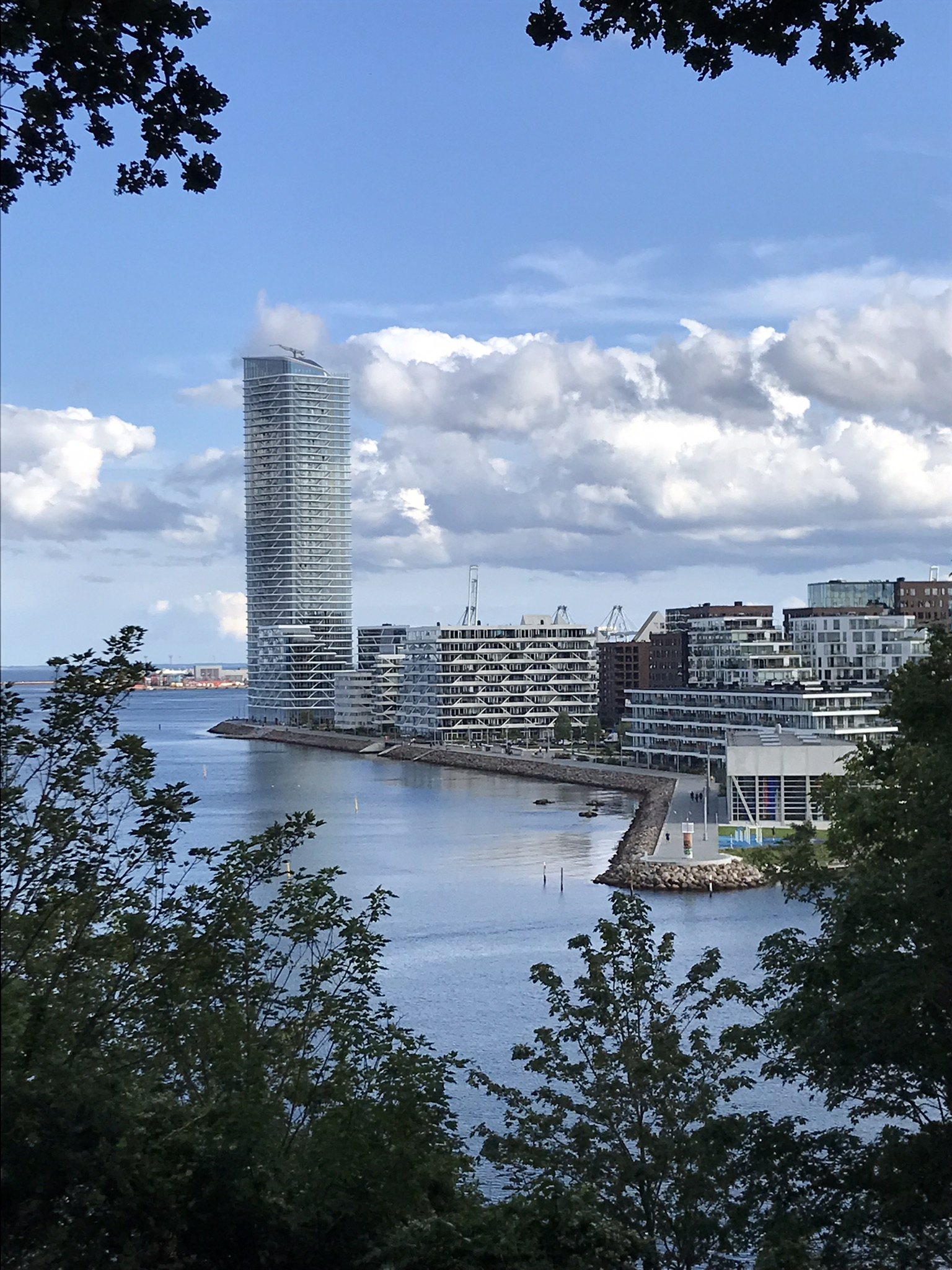
- Lighthouse (July 2023)
- Interactive map of the Lighthouse area

General information
- Status: finished 2022
- Type: Residential, Commercial
- Location: Aarhus
- Coordinates: 56°09′56.26″N 10°13′52.88″E
- Estimated completion: 2014
- Opening: 2012
- Cost: DKK 2.5 billion

Height
- Roof: 142 m (466 ft)

Technical details
- Floor area: 800,000 m^{2} (8,600,000 sq ft)

Design and construction
- Architects: 3XN & UNStudio
- Developer: Lighthouse*konsortiet
- Structural engineer: Grontmij Carl Bro

The Lighthouse (or Lighthouse*), is a residential project in Aarhus Docklands, the new harbour front district of Aarhus. The project was originally divided in 2 phases, but due to financial problems, the first phase was sub-divided in 2 stages. Both these initial stages are completed, with stage 2 finished in 2014.

Despite what its name might suggest, Lighthouse is not actually a functioning lighthouse, since such was not needed at the time of construction.

==== Construction and change of plans ====
The original second phase of the Lighthouse project, included a 142 m (466 ft) tower. Located at the edge of the harbour front, overlooking the Aarhus Bay, it would have been the tallest building in Denmark and a landmark for the city of Aarhus. It was planned to comprise more apartments, offices, a hotel and restaurant and underground parking lots. In addition to the original financial problems, it was discovered during the construction of phase 1 in 2008, that the construction ground was not stable enough to support a tower of that size. A countrywide geological survey showed that the building site was in fact one of the most unstable in Denmark. In December 2013, the investment company Havneinvest A/S decided not to use the buy- and construct-option for the tower site. The option prize was DKK 270 mill (originally DKK 417 million), but after four years of thorough investigations for DKK 9 million, the investor concluded that the project could not be realized. The investigations revealed among several issues, that the wind conditions could not allow for balconies at the tower. The Hilton Hotels & Resorts company has also abandoned the project, because they found the hotel capacity in Aarhus large enough for the market.

The construction price for the tower has been estimated at DKK 1.5 billion and now Aarhus Municipality is considering other investors and a rethinking of the original tower project altogether.

==== Return of the tower ====
On 13 March 2018, a modified version of the tower was publicly reinstated into the Lighthouse plan. The 45-story, 142-metre (466 ft)-tall building was completed in 2023.

== Gallery ==
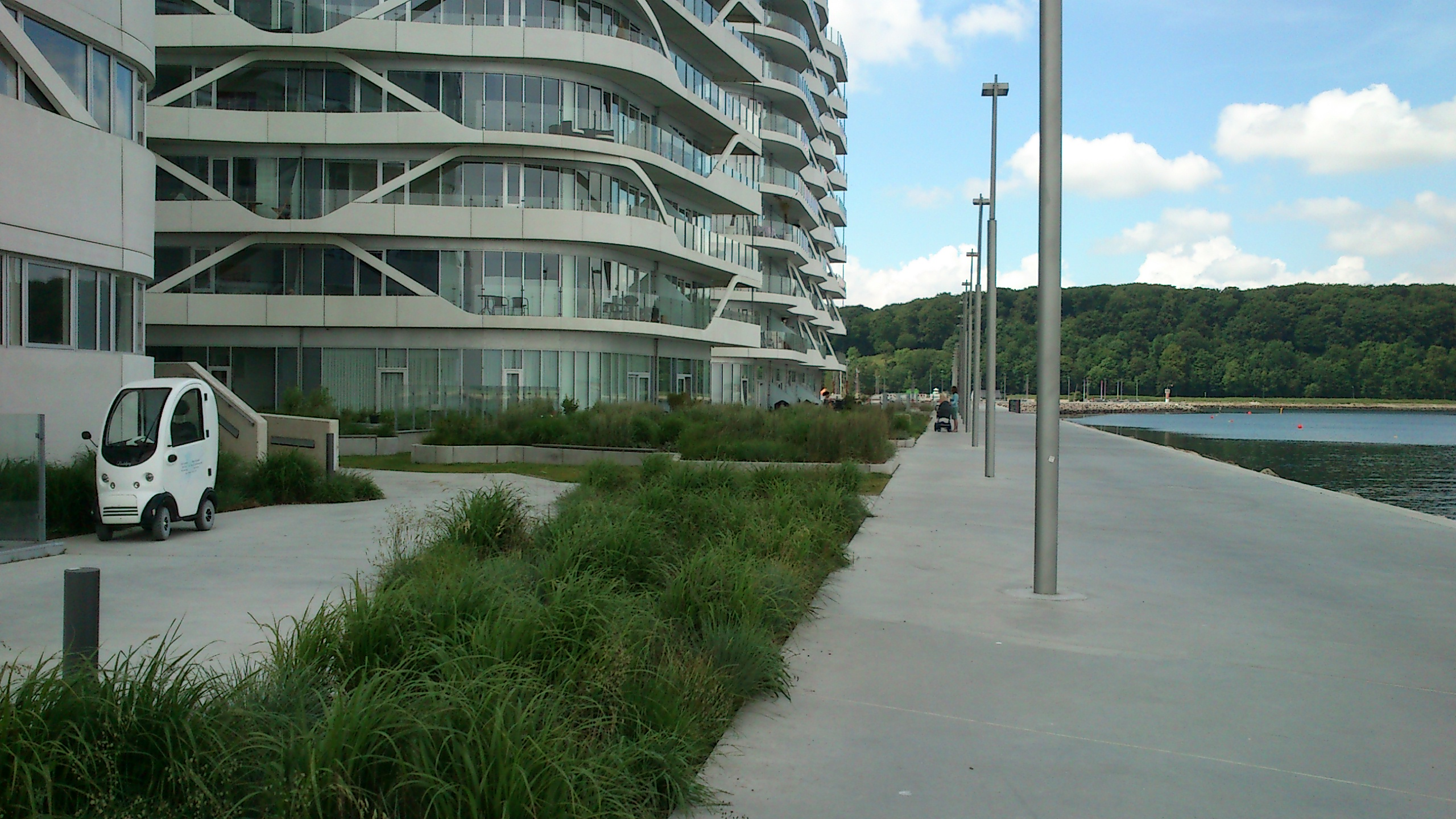
The long coastal promenade at Lighthouse

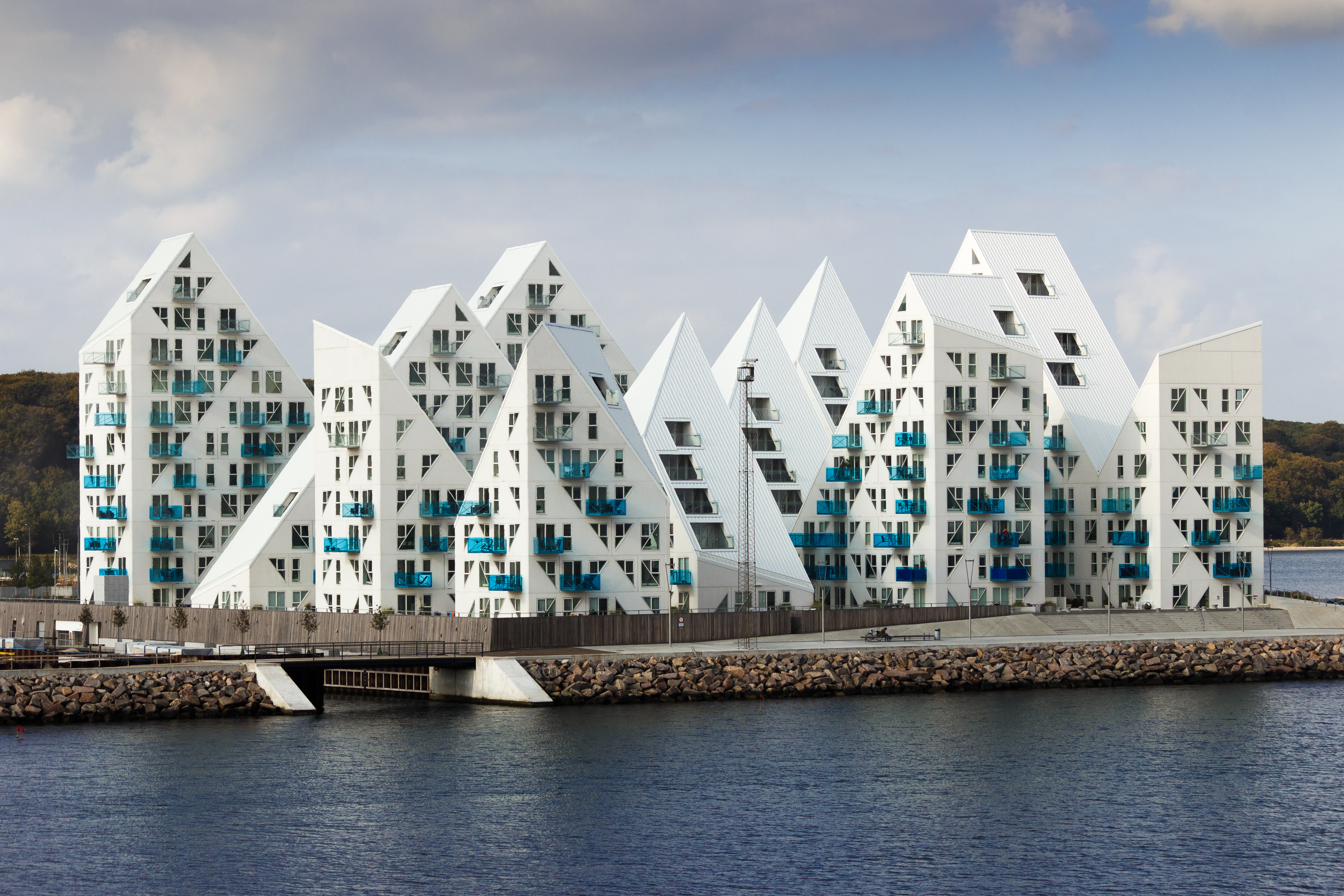
Isbjerget

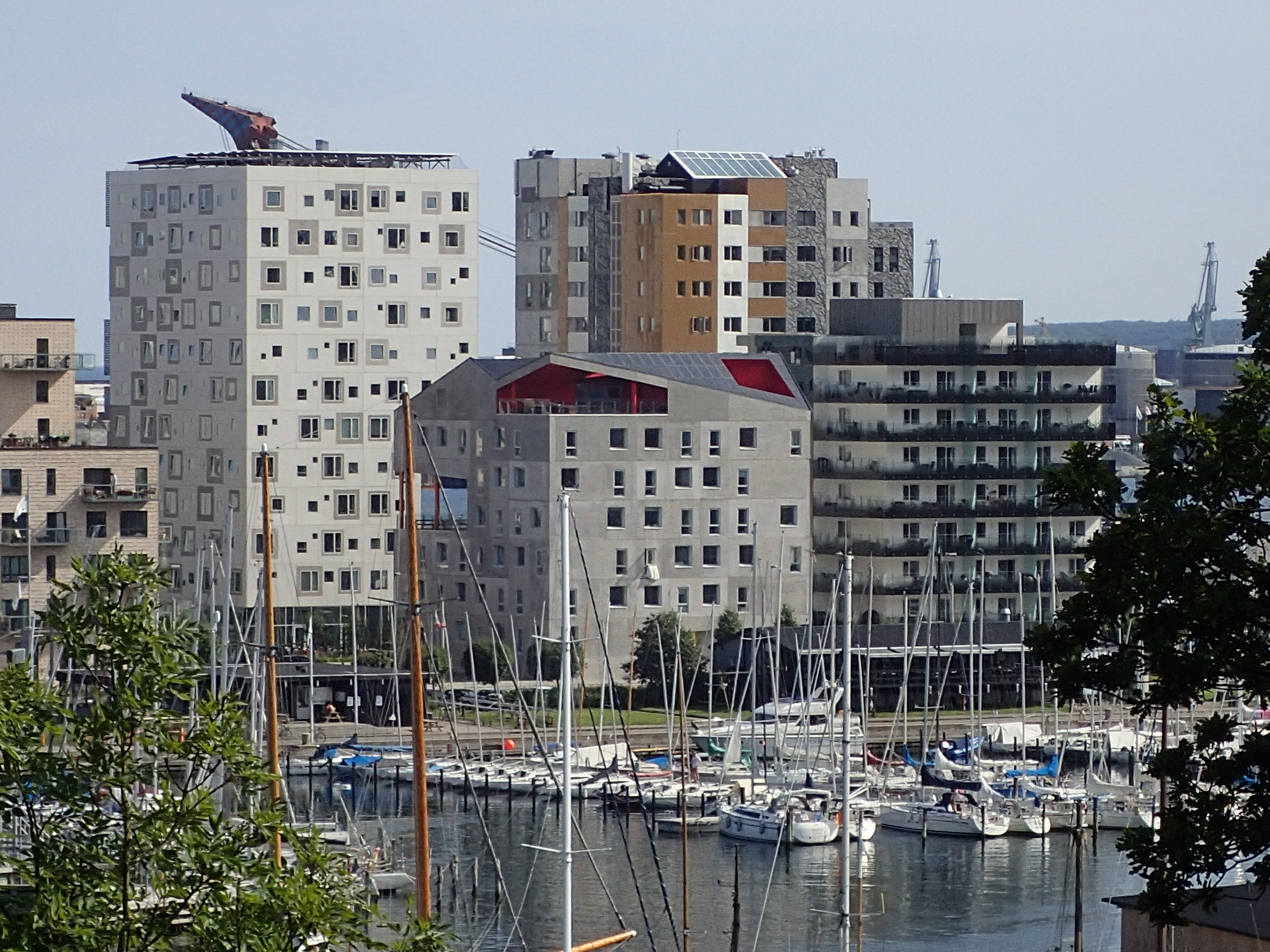
Four youth accommodation blocks in a building cluster.

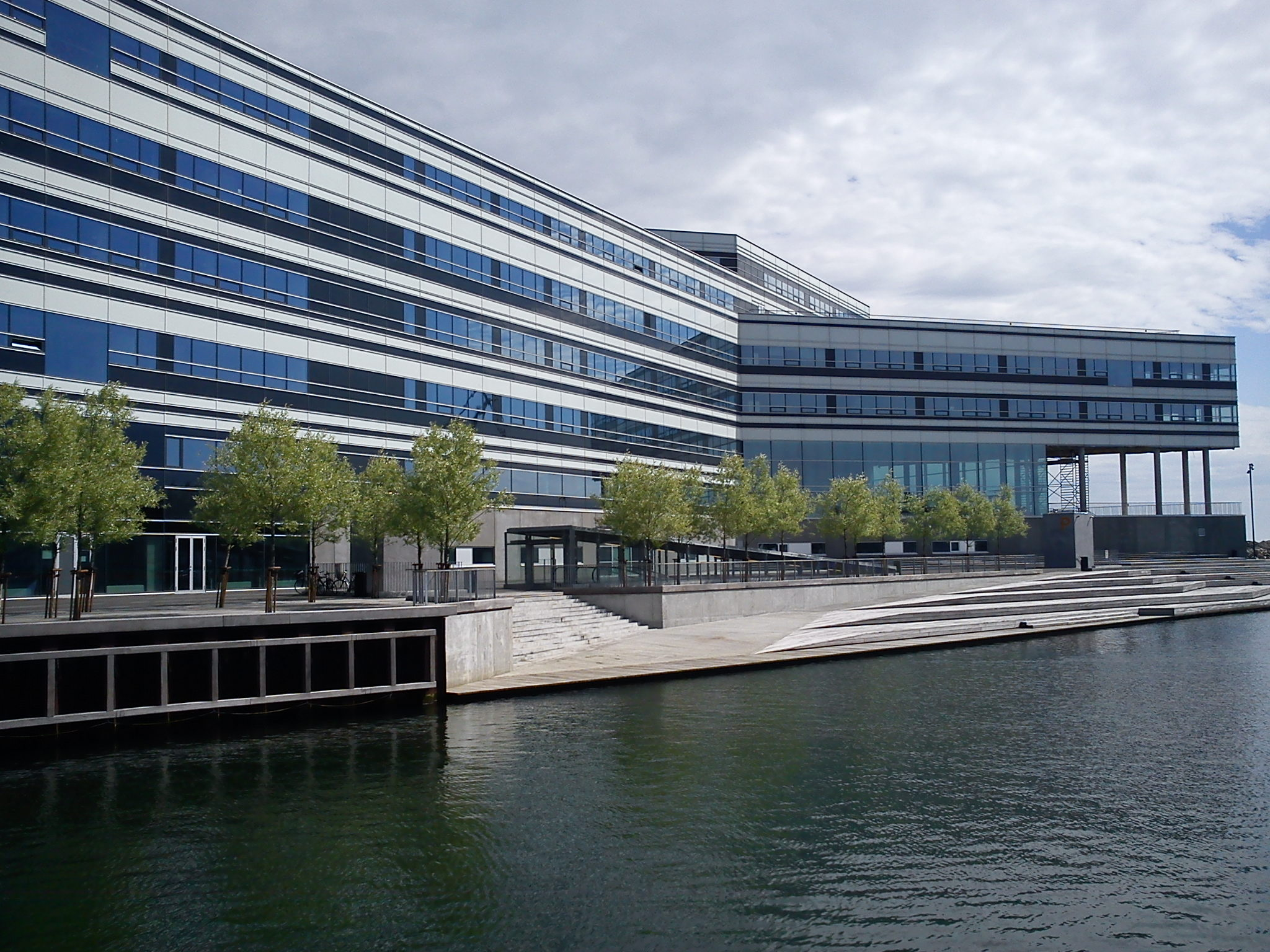
Navitas Park

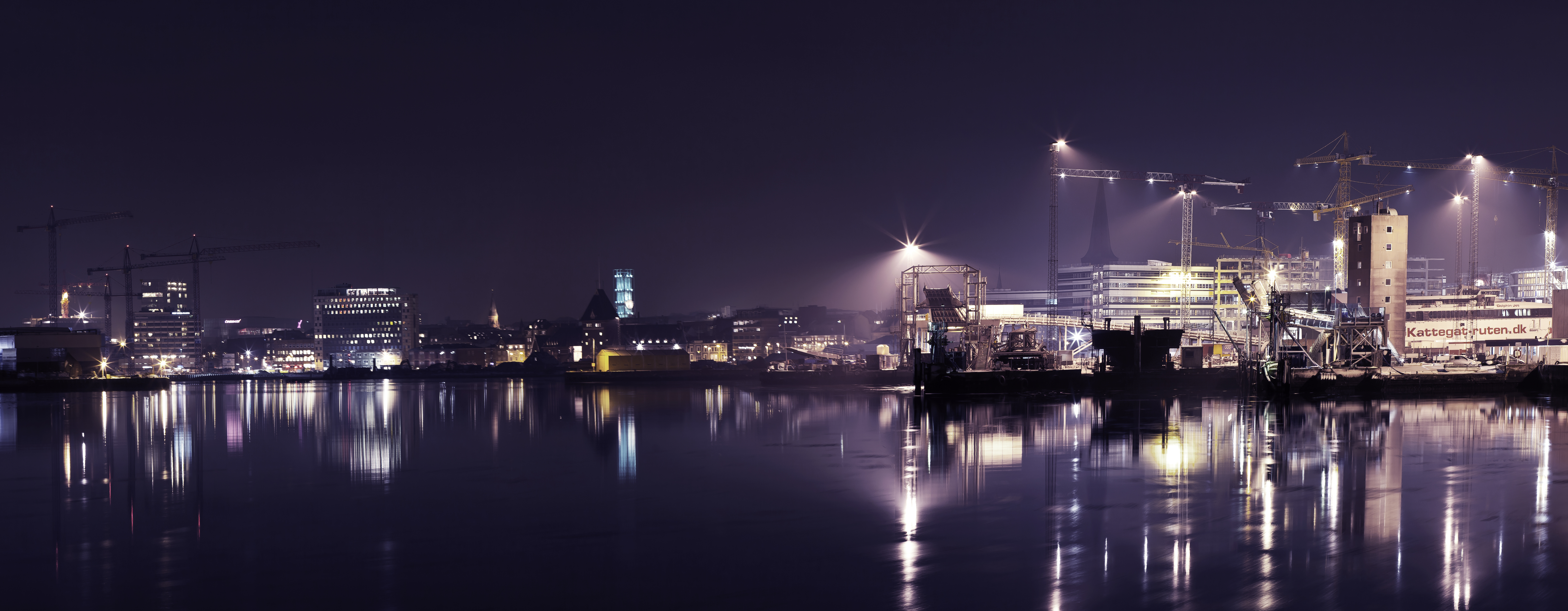
Aarhus Docklands by night.

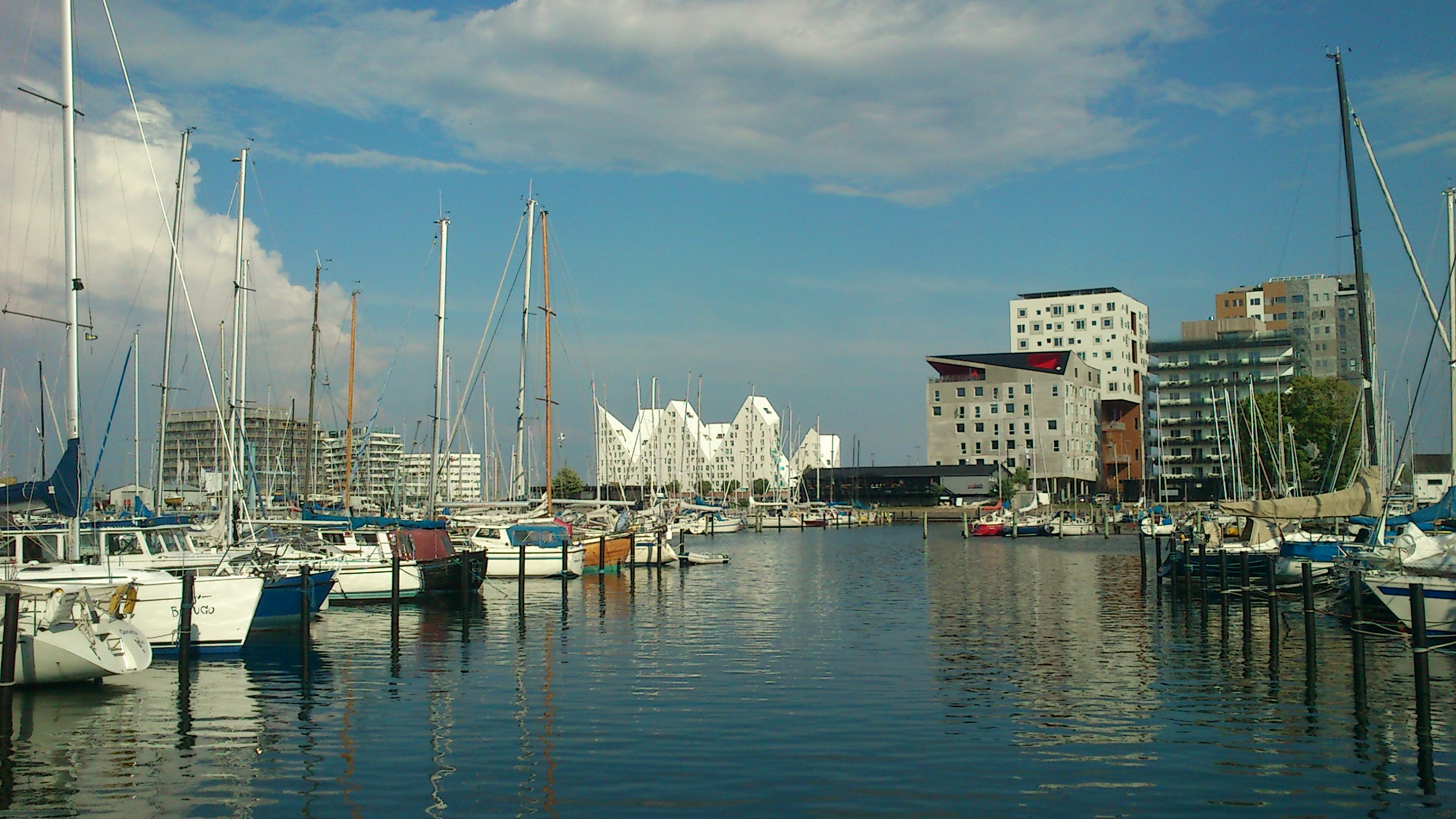
The yacht harbour

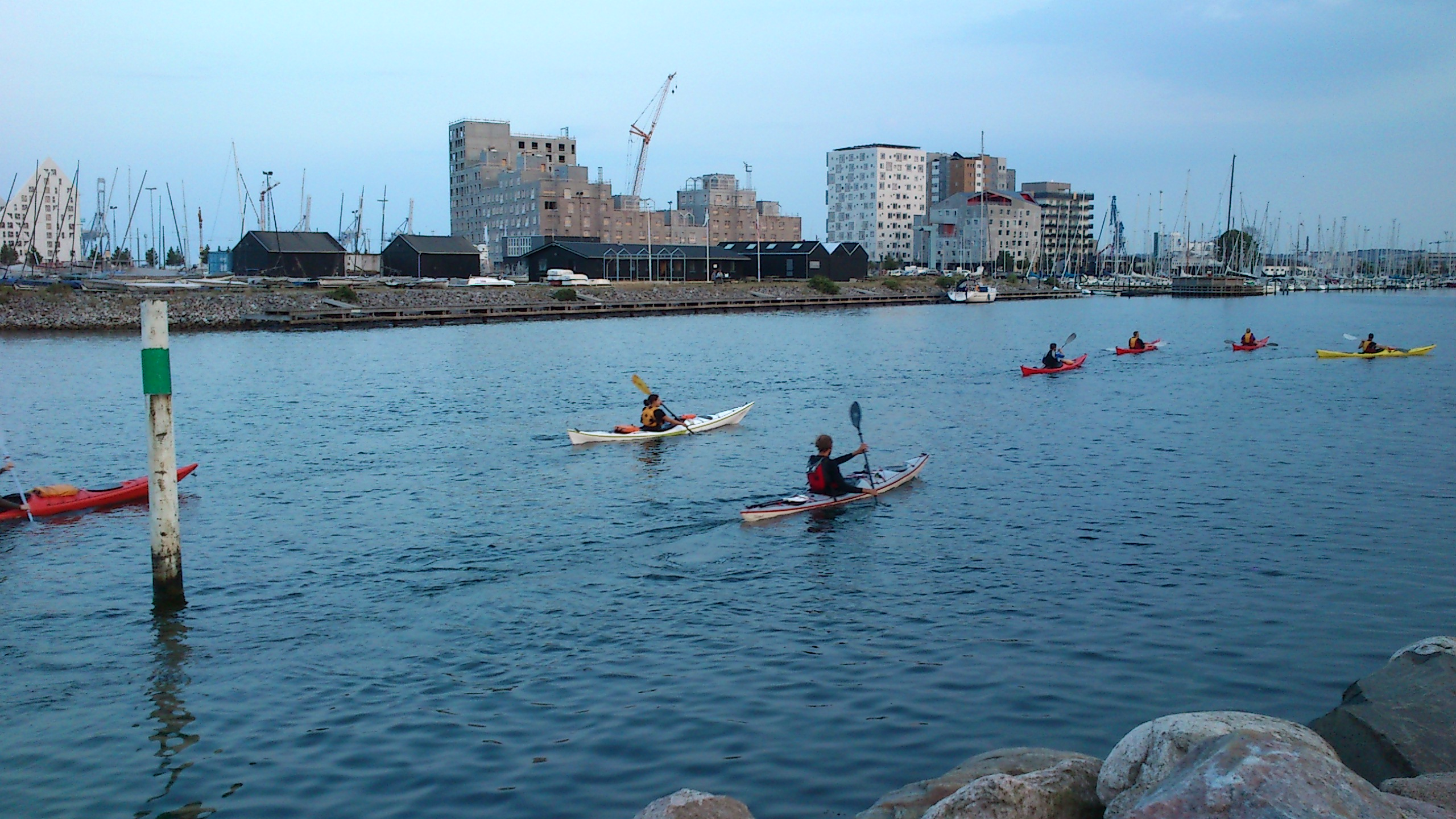
Watersports

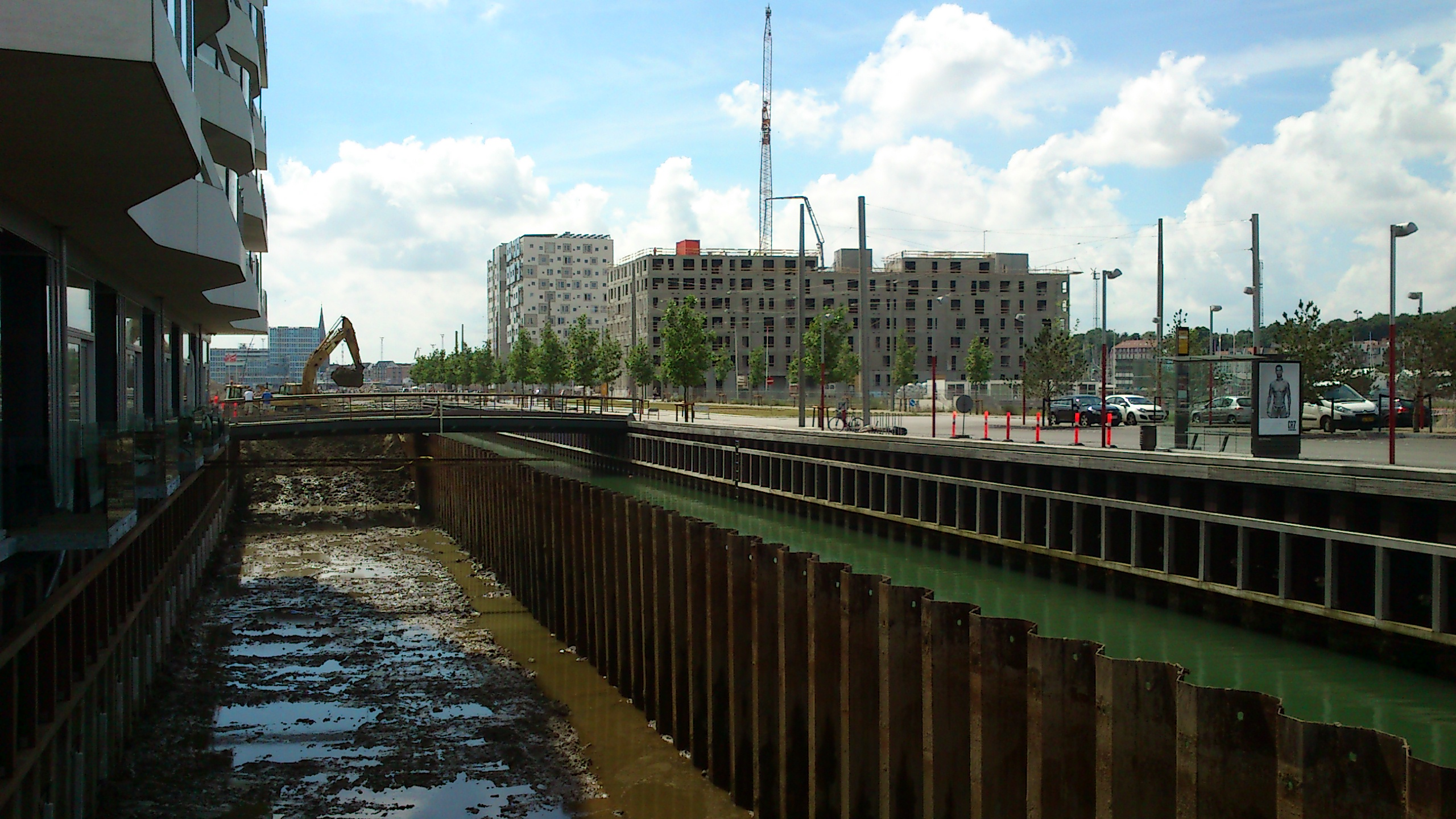
New canals are an important aspect of the city quarter (2014)

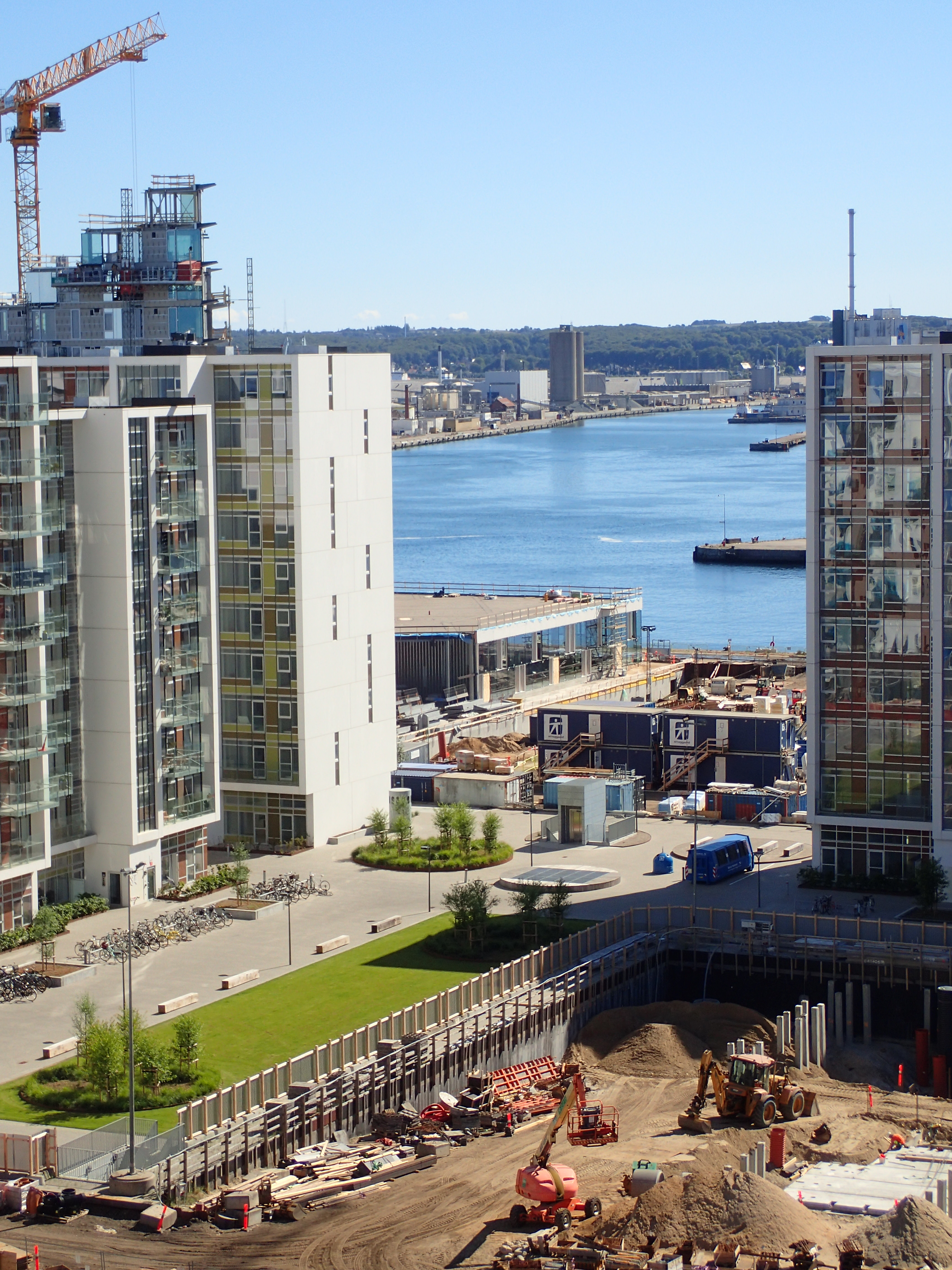
Construction in 2018

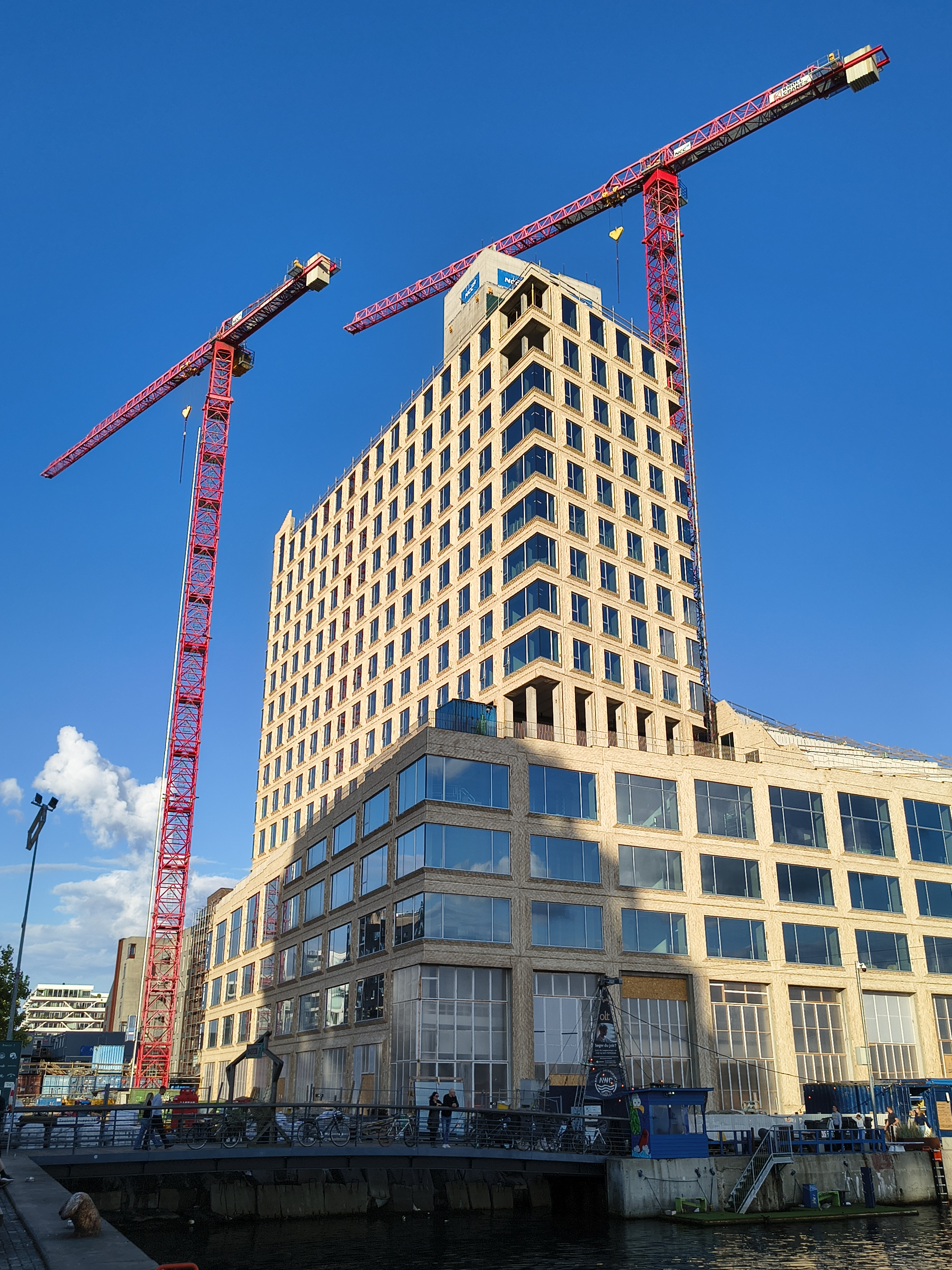
Construction in 2025 (Irmahus)

== Sources ==
- The Aarhus Docklands The Development Secretariat for the Aarhus Docklands
- Aarhus kommune
- De Bynære Havnearealer, Center for Byudvikling og Mobilitet (17 September 2014): Lighthouse*: Ikonbyggeri på kanten af Aarhus, Aarhus Kommune.
