= Port of Aarhus =

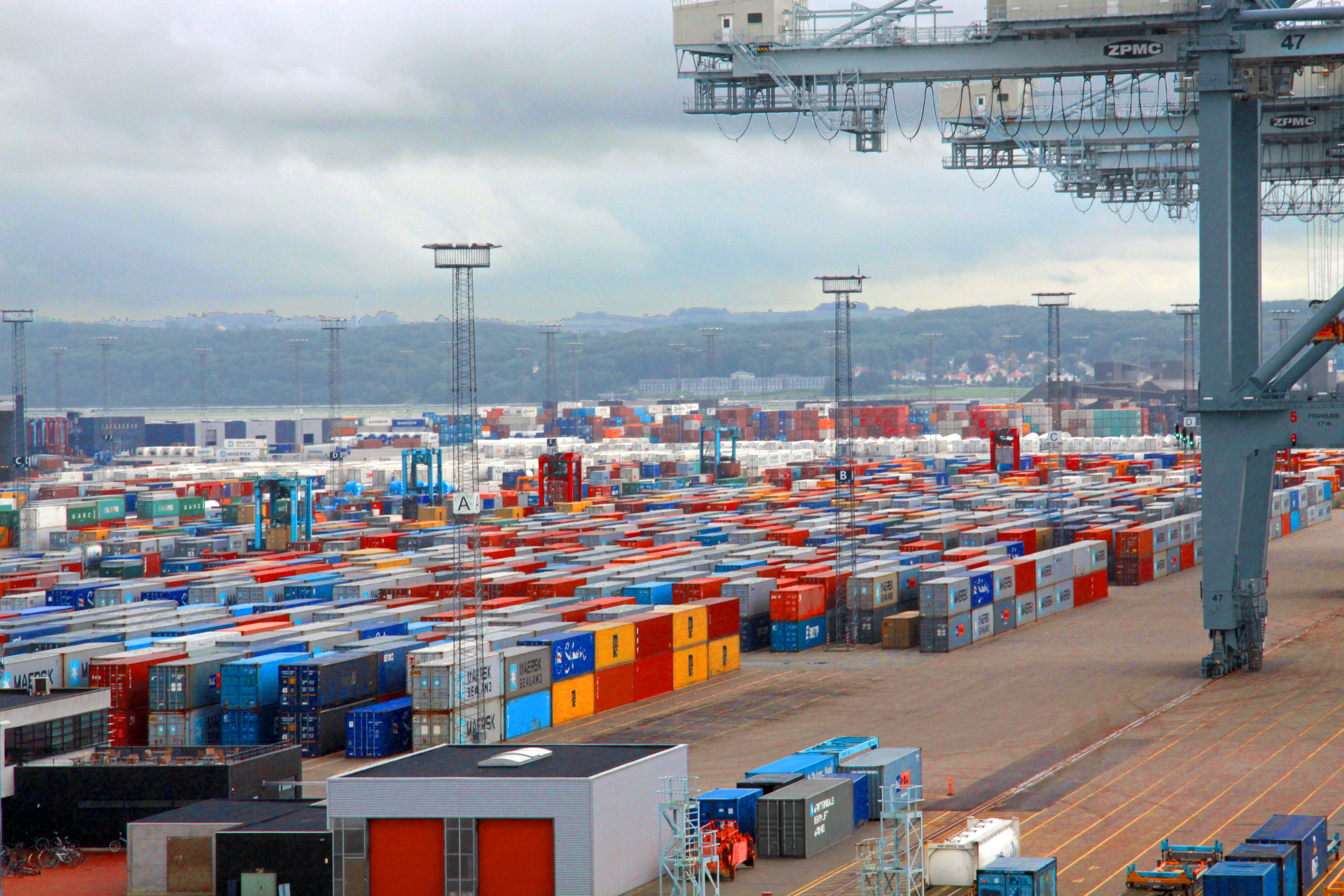
- Container Terminal, Port of Aarhus
- Click on the map for a fullscreen view

Location
- Country: Denmark
- Location: Aarhus
- Coordinates: 56.148°N 10.235°E

Details
- Opened: 1845
- Operated by: Aarhus Municipality
- Owned by: Public
- Type of harbour: Deep-water seaport

Statistics
- Annual cargo tonnage: 8.4 million (2017)
- Website https://www.aarhushavn.dk/

The Port of Aarhus (Danish: Aarhus Havn) is a deep-sea port located in the city of Aarhus. It is the largest container port in Denmark, handling more than 50% of country's container traffic. The Port of Aarhus shipped roughly 8.4 million metric tonnes of cargo in 2017.

== Geography ==
The Port of Aarhus is located in central Aarhus at the mouth of the Aarhus River on the Bay of Aarhus in Kattegat. The port faces Helgenæs to the East, Samsø to South East and on the coast the Marselisborg Forests lies to the South and Riis Skov lies to the North.

== Administration ==
The Port of Aarhus is owned and managed by Aarhus Municipality as a financially independent company. The mayor and two city council members are automatically granted seats on the board of directors after municipal elections with the mayor assuming the position of chairman. The board consists of 7 members; 3 city council members, 3 members with a background in business and 1 representative elected among the employees of the port.

== History ==
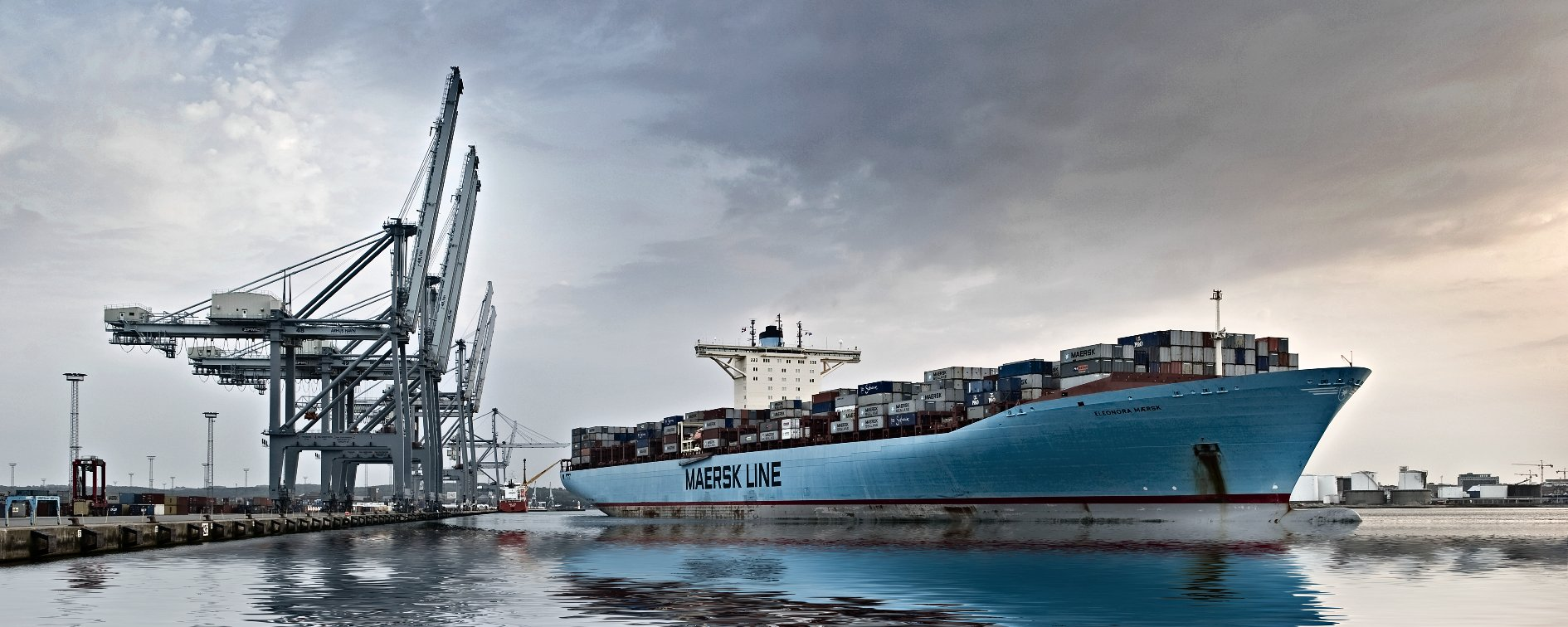
Eleonora Maersk in the harbor

Aarhus is one of the oldest cities of Denmark, founded in the Viking Age in the 8th century at a natural harbor on the northern shores of a former fjord. The fjord gradually narrowed, by natural sediment transport, into a river and in the 19th century the harbor was moved to the coast by the newly formed city council. In 1845-61 and 1883-90 the harbor was successively expanded into what became Nordhavnen (The North Harbor). In 1905-11 Sydhavnen (The South Harbor) was constructed in the form of a new, larger pier extending from the South along the East side of the harbor. In 1935-60 and 1984-1992 the North Harbor was expanded again and from 1975 another larger pier was constructed from South to North East.

Through the Middle Ages the harbor primarily exported grain to Norway and Germany from the large agricultural catchment areas around Aarhus. In the early 19th century, as the Industrial Revolution took hold, imports became predominantly coal and iron based and in the 1880 it was supplemented by feedstuffs, fertilizer and grain as Danish agriculture changed from grain export to animal husbandry. In the 1870s grain exports started to decline as the new harbor in Esbjerg absorbed agricultural exports from Jutland but it was offset in the early 20th century by exports of oils, feedstuffs, processed foods and industrial products.

In 1997, Århus City Council announced a Masterplan for expansion and development of the port. The expansion will double the harbor area to 350 hectares. The oldest and most central areas in Nordhavnen is being converted into urban areas, including the new neighborhood Aarhus Ø.

== Harbour terminals ==
The port of Aarhus has 6 terminals; container, multi, bulk, tanker, ferry and cruise terminals. The container terminal has a 1300-meters long pier, a water depth of 14 meters with 3 Post-Panamax cranes, 4 Super Post-Panamax cranes, and 1 Panamax crane, and covers an area of 750,000 m^{2}. The Multiterminal handles bulk cargo such as coal and feedstuffs and project cargo such as wood and windmills. The bulk terminal handles loose cargo such as grain, sand and gravel. The tanker terminal handles mineral oils, gasoline, chemicals, molasses and cement. The ferry terminal is mainly used by Molslinjen which operates a route to Odden on Sjællands Odde, but there are also irregular ro-ro ferries to Finland and Copenhagen. The cruise terminal receives cruise ships primarily from the Baltic Sea. Since 2016 a regular seaplane service has been in operation by Nordic Seaplanes, departing from the Port of Aarhus to Copenhagen.

== Economy ==
Million tons (mt) moved
year	mt
2000	9,847
2001	9,980
2002	9,622
2003	9,982
2004	10,356
2005	11,168
2006	11,914
2007	12,188
2008	11,814
2009	8,859
2010	9,386
2011	9,169
2012	8,403
2013	8,059
2014	7,614
2015	7,707
2016	8,038
2017	8,399
Sources: Statistics Denmark

The Port of Aarhus maintains a large industrial area home to some 150 companies primarily in the transport and industry sectors which employs some 10,000 people. As of 2015 it is the largest containerport in Denmark with a market share of almost 60% and the largest public bulk terminal in the country. The ferry terminal services around 1,000,000 vehicles and some 2,000,000 passengers yearly.

== See also ==
- List of ports in Denmark
- Container transport
- Aarhus Docklands
- Marselisborg Yacht Harbour
