= 5 Kolonne =

Danish resistance organization

5th Column
- 5. Kolonne
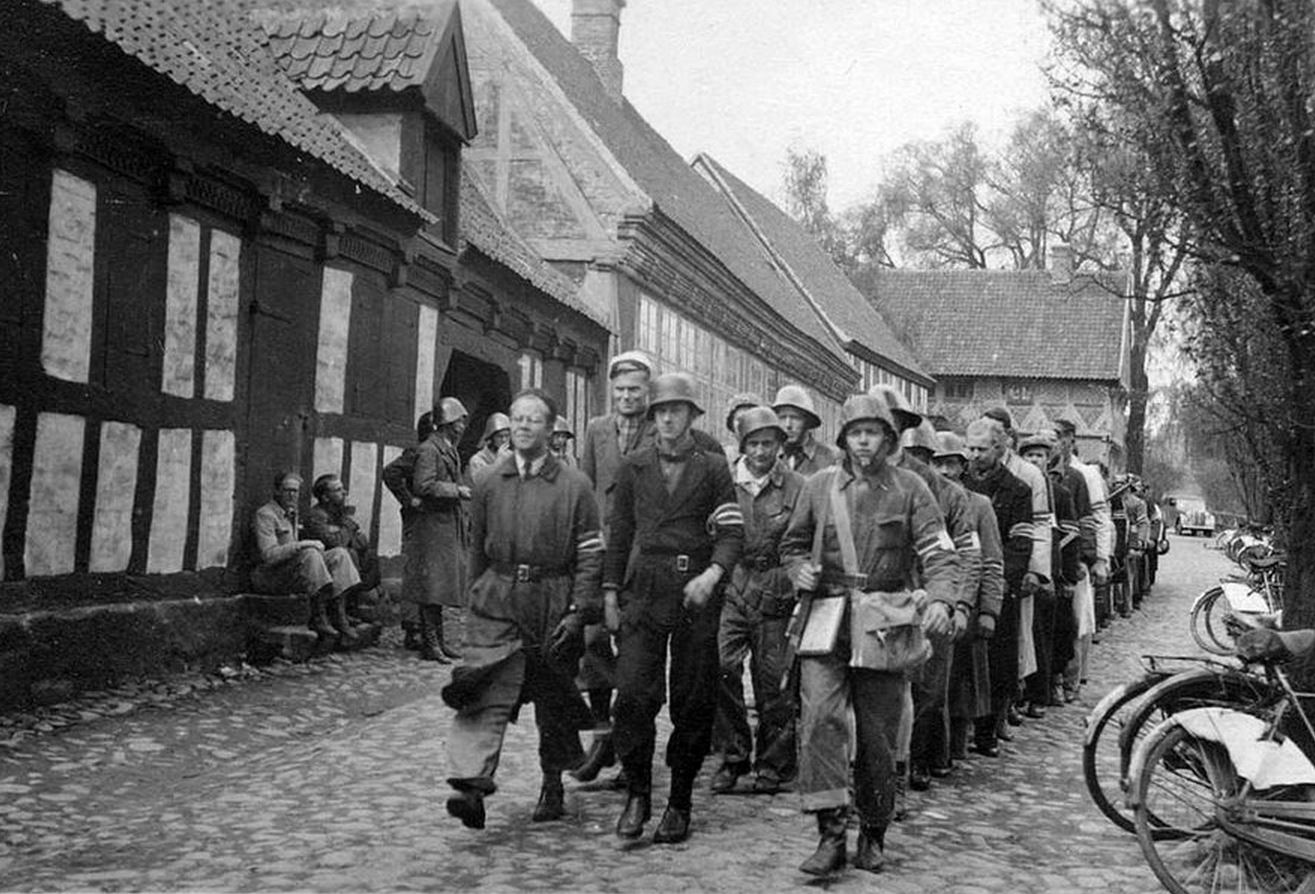
- Resistance group 5. Kolonne in The Old Town museum
- Leader: Ernst Fisker
- Dates active: June 1943 - June 1944
- Headquarters: Aarhus, Denmark
- Size: 130
- Part of: Danish resistance
- Wars: Second World War

5. Kolonne (lit. 'Fifth column') was an organization that employed violence and sabotage to oppose the occupation of Denmark by German forces during the Second World War. The organization was formed and based in Aarhus and with some 100 members it was one of the larger resistance groups in that area in the later years of the war. The group was created in response to the destruction of the resistance groups in Jutland by the Gestapo between late 1943 and the summer of 1944. The group functioned from June 1944 to the end of the occupation in May 1945.

== Background ==
The Danish resistance was in the early years of the occupation dominated by communists, forced underground when the Danish government signed the Communist Law on 22 August 1941. In Aarhus there were a number of such groups, focused on disrupting production, telecommunications and transport networks. Generally the resistance groups had become increasingly active over the years as their members grew in numbers, gained experience and developed networks. Supporting the sabotage groups were groups focused on receiving supplies through allied airdrops, so-called receiver-groups (Danish: Modtagergruppe), a network which had also taken time to develop. By 1943 weapons and supplies were arriving with regularity and communications had been established with the central resistance command and contacts in England.

On 13 December 1943 the British paratrooper Jakob Jensen was caught by the Gestapo in Aarhus. During interrogation he supplied information about the networks of receiver groups in Jutland which resulted in many groups being destroyed, including the Hvidsten Group whose members were arrested on March 11, 1944. These events effectively crippled the resistance movement throughout the peninsula as supplies dried up. In Aarhus the resistance groups faced another problem as Grethe Bartram from the communist and resistance environment in Aarhus was hired as an informant by the Gestapo in March/April 1944. Bartram in total informed on some 50 resistance members leading to many groups in and around the city being dismantled by German authorities, including the Samsing Group in June 1944.

The events in the 6 months from December 1943 to June 1944 had effectively wiped out the leadership of the resistance in Jutland and stopped resistance operations in Aarhus. The city was, however, an important seaport and rail hub for the German war effort with troops and supplies arriving frequently from Germany to be shipped out through the Port of Aarhus to Oslo and Riga. German authorities had until the Invasion of Normandy on June 6, 1944 also been concerned that an allied invasion might take place in Jutland and had extended the Atlantic Wall along its west coast while concentrating administrative institutions in the peninsula to prepare defenses. The German headquarters for Denmark was moved from Copenhagen to Silkeborg in November 1943, the Gestapo headquarters for Jutland was moved to Aarhus in September 1943 and the supply headquarters for Denmark was moved to Aarhus in October 1943. Combined these factors had made Aarhus an area of particular interest for the resistance movement and it was considered a priority to re-establish new groups that could disrupt German operations.

In the spring of 1944, lieutenant commander Ernst Fisker from the 3rd Field Artillery Brigade, stationed in Aarhus' Langelandsgade Barracks prior to the war, came into contact with the resistance movement in Aarhus. He was encouraged by the commander of the resistance in Jutland to take command of any units in Aarhus, build up a new command structure and develop sabotage groups that could interfere with German operations, especially the railway.

== Formation ==
The first groups in the new organization were formed over the early summer of 1944. Initially one group was to obtain supplies while two others were sabotage groups, primarily intended to target infrastructure; in particular the railway and port. The first shipment of weapons was collected in July and the first operation against the railway occurred later that month when the rail line to Randers was bombed as a means of testing equipment. In August the Holger Danske resistance group sent a representative, Jens Lillelund, to help build up the new groups and the overall command structure. Through 1944 the organization was gradually expanded with groups specialized in attacks on production and repair facilities.

In the fall of 1944, it was considered a possibility that fighting might reach Denmark and a new wing was established within 5 Kolonne, the Demolition Groups (Danish: Nedrivningsgrupper). The intent of these groups was to destroy vital infrastructure in the event of an allied invasion so as to isolate and immobilize the German garrison in Aarhus. Contact was made with groups in other cities and towns throughout Jutland and demolition groups were set up under the central command of 5 Kolonne.

Organization

5 Kolonne was organized around a system of small independent groups, composed of typically 3 members, that primarily interacted with a central commander but rarely with each other.

Commander; Ernst Fisker
Second in command	Commander, Demolition Groups
Receiver Group	Sabotage Groups; 12 Groups	External groups 12 Groups	Internal groups 9 Groups

The external demolition groups included groups in Randers, Tilst, Viborg, Silkeborg, Odder, Grenå and Aalborg. The sabotage groups were generally made up of people who worked in specific locations. One group was entirely made up of workers from the harbor, another of DSB personnel and another of workers from the electricity company.

== Operations ==
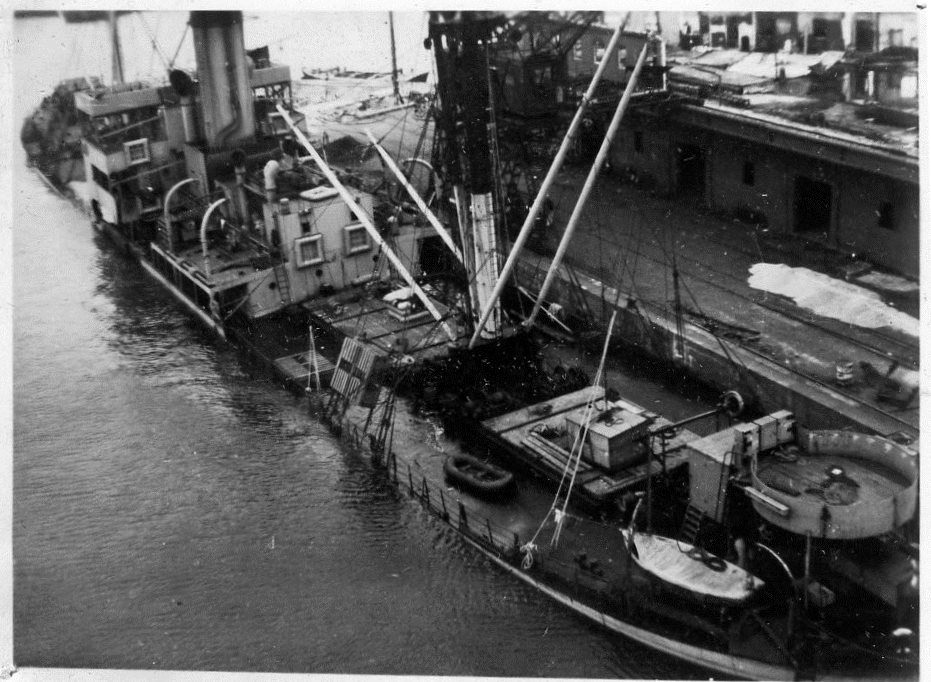
The German steamer Scharnørn, sunken after sabotage, Port of Aarhus

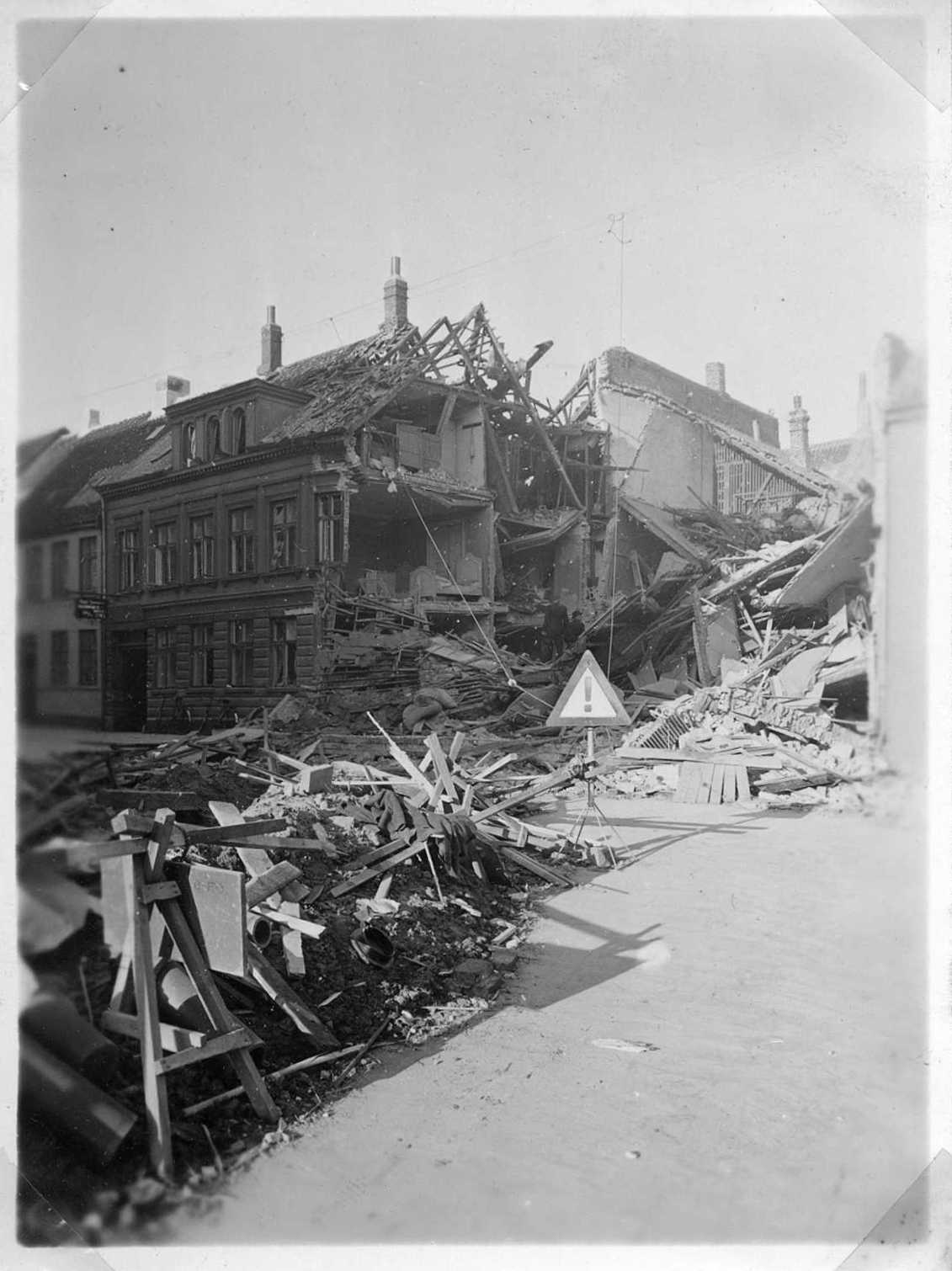
Aftermath of sabotage action against Universalfabrikkerne, Aarhus

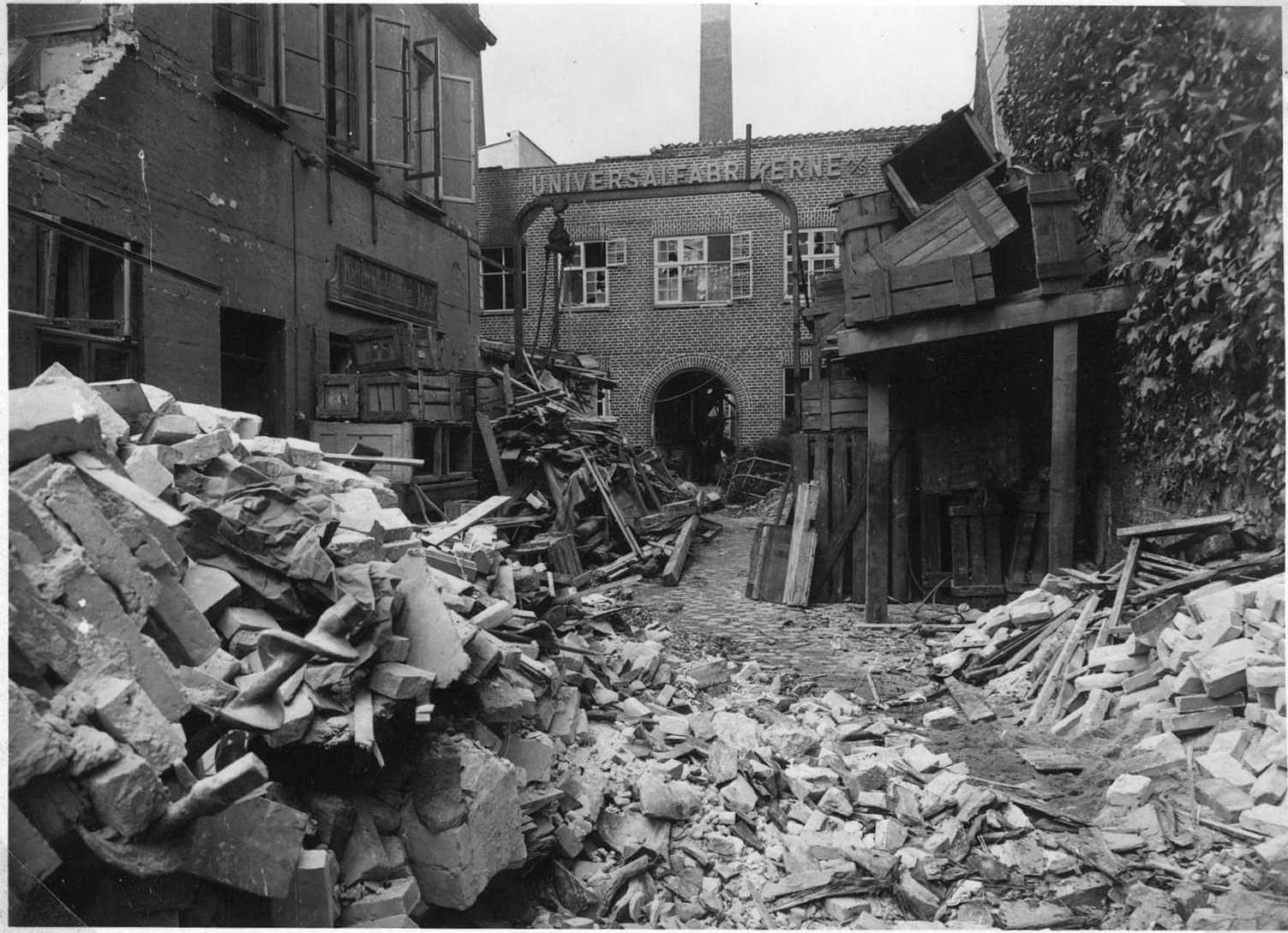
Aftermath of sabotage action against Universalfabrikkerne, Aarhus

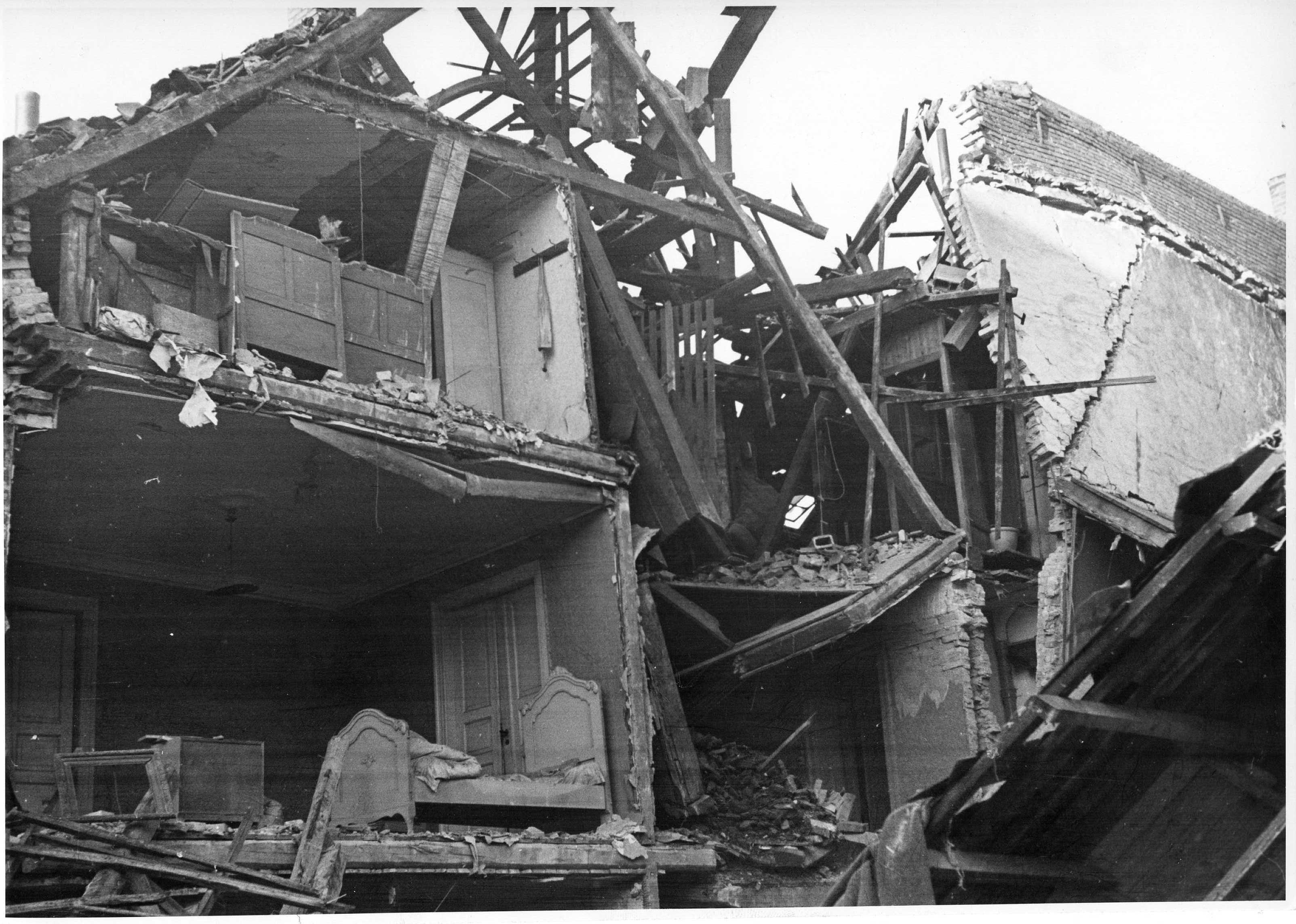
Aftermath of sabotage action against Universalfabrikkerne, Aarhus

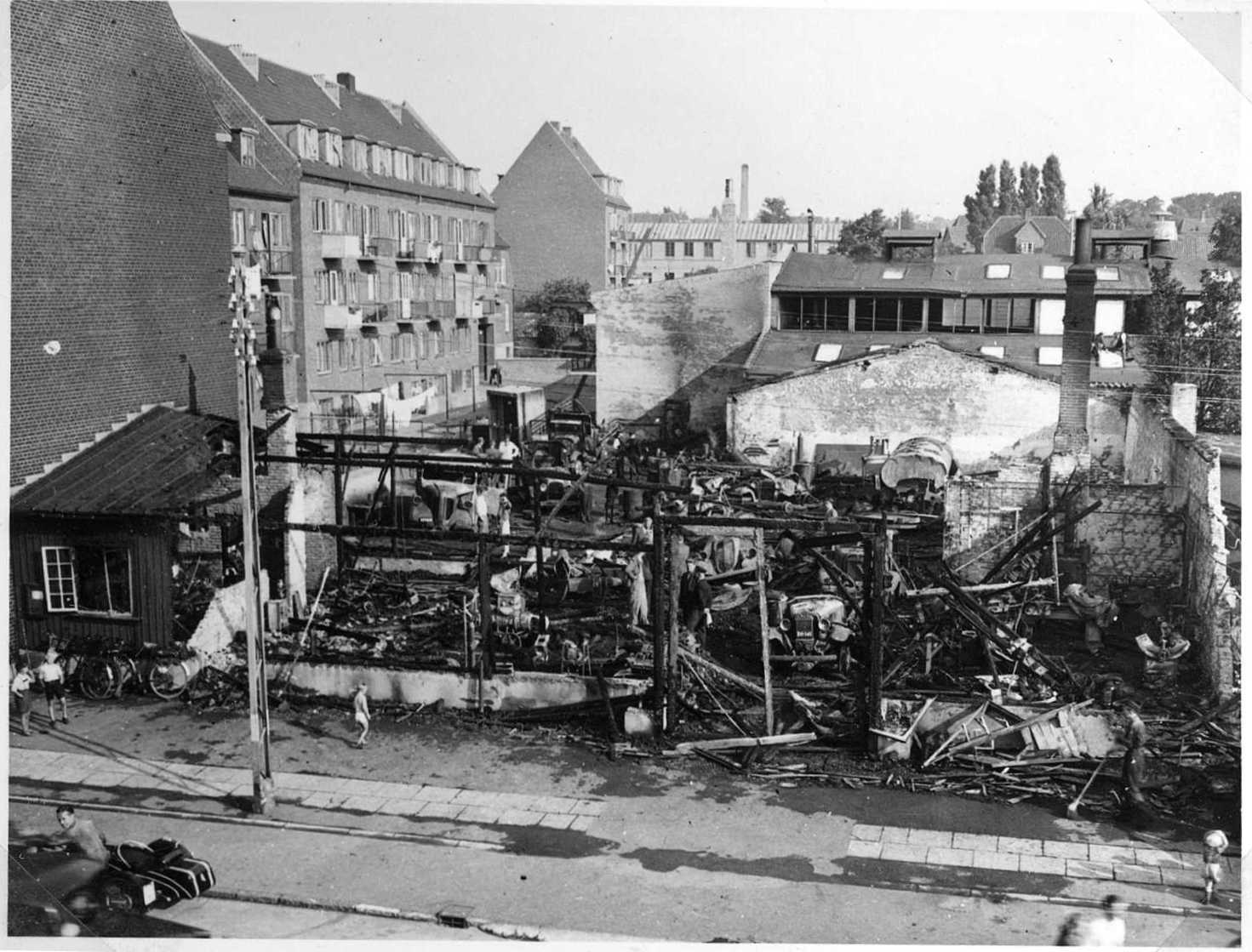
Aftermath of sabotage action against car repair shop on Silkeborgvej, Aarhus

=== 1944 ===
The group performed about 100 acts of sabotage between September 1944 and May 1945. The harbor groups sank or destroyed three ships and damaged or destroyed some 50 factories or businesses. 3 members of the group died during different operations and memorial stone has been erected in Tranbjerg for two of them.

11 September	Offices of Universalfabrikkerne on Park Allé torched.
13 September	Factory building in Fredensgade bombed.
15 September	Electrical substation in Derbys harbor destroyed.
17 September	Factory in Fredensgade bombed again and destroyed.
26 September	Bike storage on Tordenskjoldsgade 16 bombed.
27 September	Explosion in German marine depot in the harbor.
2 October	4 German locomotives at Frichs destroyed.
8 October	Mechanics shop on Nordrevej in Åbyhøj torched.
9 October	Offices of Derby destroyed bombed.
9 October	2 explosions in workshop in the south harbor.
10 October	Steamer Scharnørn sunk at pier with bombs.
13 October	3 cars bombed in the harbor.
16 October	Cannon emplacement in Marselisborg Lystbådehavn bombed.
24 October	Bombs on rail line between Aarhus and Hasselager.
25 October	Bombs on rail line between Aarhus and Hasselager.
26 October	Bombs on rail line between Aarhus and Hasselager.
26 October	Hauling winge in south harbor destroyed.
27 October	Mechanics shop in Østergade destroyed.
28 October	Air drying facility in Risskov torched.
1 November	Mechanics shop at Kirkegårdsvej 10 torched.
1 November	Mechanics shop at central bus station torched.
2 November	Mechanics shop in Jægergårdsgade 101 torched.
2 November	Cars in Búlows workshop in Trøjborg destroyed.
3 November	9 track switches between Østbanegården and Aarhus Central Station destroyed.
5 November	Track on the rail line between Aarhus and Hasselager destroyed.
6 November	Factory in Vejlby destroyed.
7 November	2 cranes in north harbor destroyed.
8 November	Rail line between Aarhus and Risskov damaged.
9 November	Rail line between Aarhus and Skanderborg damaged.
10 November	German concrete mixer destroyed.
13 November	Slipway in south harbor destroyed.
16 November	Fuel station on Randersvej bombed.
16 November	Workshop in Vigenshus bombed.
18 November	7 rail cars under Frederiksbroen destroyed.
2 December	German package depot at godsbanegården torched.
15 December	Electrical substation in Langelandsgade destroyed.
18 December	Laundry facility in Mejlgade bombed.

=== 1945 ===
2 January	Camouflage material in Viby destroyed.
9 January	Sabotage against German radio vehicle in the harbor.
12 January	German command central in Handelsbankens hus destroyed.
13 January	2 rail cars under Frederiksbroen destroyed.
23 January	2 cars bombed.
23 January	Electrical substation at orthopedic hospital destroyed.
25 January	3 track switches between Aarhus central station and harbor destroyed.
3 February	Factory in Fredensgade torched.
5 February	Extensive sabotage against rail lines around Aarhus.
7 February	Firefight between resistance fighters and German troops in Brabrand.
8 February	Machines in factory in Vejlby destroyed.
8 February	Factory in Bruunsgade 62 torched.
11 February	Extensive sabotage against rail lines north of Aarhus.
19 February	Bombs against DSB bodywork facility.
20 February	German truck bombed on the corner of Samsøgade and Hjarnøgade.
21 February	5 rail cars destroyed.
22 February	German locomotive in Viby destroyed.
23 February	Bombs between Bruunsbro and Frederiksbro. Firefight breaks out and 2 resistance fighters wounded and one dies.
24 February	Armed robbery against German steamer and ammunition stolen.
26 February	Cars and trucks in Aarhus Hallen in Jægergårdsgade 162 bombed.
March 7	Building on Kystvejen partially destroyed.
March 12	Bombs in offices in Klostergade.
March 12	DSB command central destroyed.
March 12	Railway tracks between Lystrup and Risskov destroyed.
March 13	Extensive rail sabotage.
March 16	Fire set in German fortifications in Risskov.
March 18	Railway bombings between Aarhus and Mundelstrup and at Risskov.
March 21	Bombs placed at Fortevej to keep workers from working on fortification construction.
March 22	Electrical substation on Marselis Boulevard destroyed.
March 23	Failed attack on German plane results in the death of two resistance fighters.
March 24	DSB locomotive between Aarhus and Mundelstrup destroyed.
March 25	Military train derailed between Aarhus and Brabrand.
March 27	Bombs against DSB central repair facility and train depot.
March 28	Workshop in Åbyhøj torched.
April 2	German ship Gotfred Hansen sunken.
April 4	German locomotive in Viby destroyed.
April 5	Phone masts between Langelandsgade Kaserne and Vorrevangen destroyed. Firefight between resistance fighters and German troops.
April 5	Several bombs under cargo train in Brabrand.
April 6	10 German vehicles destroyed in Spanien.
April 6	Several track switches destroyed.
April 8	Cables for Wehrmacht emergency central destroyed.
April 9	Warning bombs against worker barracks in Tøndergade.
April 11	Rail line to Brabrand damaged.
April 11	Several German cars destroyed.
April 12	Rail line to Brabrand damaged.
April 12	German barracks at the central train station blown up.
April 14	Car bomb against truck company on Nordre Strandvej.
April 14	20 explosions in railyard.
April 15	Locomotive derailed at Brabrand.
April 16	German ship engine in factory destroyed.
April 16	2 German express boats destroyed.
April 16	Teargas bombs against guardhouse in Nygade.
April 17	8 bombs against cannon emplacements at Riisvangen.
April 19	German steamer Anni on slipway in harbor destroyed.
April 20	3 trucks destroyed.
April 20	Rail line between Aarhus and Brabrand bombed.
April 21	Workshop in Åbyhøj torched.
April 23	Several trucks destroyed.
April 24	Rail sabotage at Brabrand.
April 26	Hipo cars destroyed.
April 26	Workshop in Brabrand torched.
April 27	Villa in Risskov bombed.
May 1	Bombs in cargo railyard.
May 3	Extensive rail sabotage.
May 4	Extensive rail sabotage.
