= Aarhus air raid =

Air raid on Gestapo Aarhus 1944

- Part of World War II
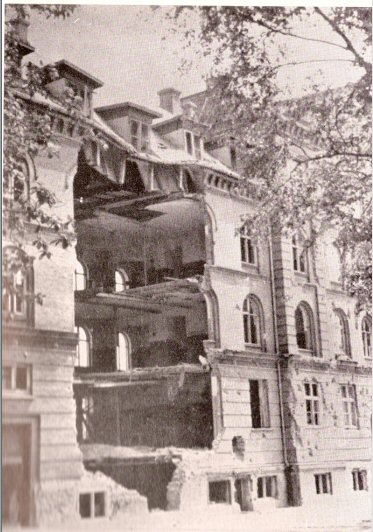
- Damaged barracks near Aarhus University residence halls, bombed on 31 October 1944
| Date | 31 October 1944 |
| Location | Aarhus, Denmark 56°09′24″N 10°12′39″E |
| Result | British victory |

Belligerents
| United Kingdom Royal Air Force | Germany |

Strength
| 24 bombers 1 reconnaissance air craft | Various anti-aircraft defences 1 light cruiser |

Casualties and losses
| 1 aircraft destroyed 1 aircrew interned | Gestapo offices destroyed German barracks heavily damaged 39 German agents and officers killed 20 German soldiers killed |
- ~10 Danish civilians killed 1+ Danish civilian wounded 1 Danish prisoner killed

The Aarhus air raid took place on 31 October 1944, when 25 Mosquitoes from 140 Wing Royal Air Force (RAF) of the 2nd Tactical Air Force, bombed the Gestapo headquarters at the University of Aarhus, Denmark. After the Second World War, the RAF called the mission the most successful of its kind during the war.

== Background ==
During the Second World War, Aarhus was occupied by German forces, which established their headquarters in the Jutland area in the eastern parts of the University of Aarhus, placing their main offices and archives in the buildings usually reserved for student dormitories. In Aarhus, the Gestapo was headed by Eugen Schwitzgebel; the Sicherheitsdienst, led by Obersturmbannführer Lonechun and the Abwehr, commanded by Oberstleutnant Lutze, were also based there. The 577th Volksgrenadier Division was based in Aarhus during the raid. On 25 August 1944 the unit was established; by September its draftees were transferred to the 47th Infantry Division and the last members left Aarhus on 10 November to fight later on the Western Front.

The summer and autumn of 1944 was a difficult time for the resistance in Jutland. On 13 December 1943, the British paratrooper Jakob Jensen was caught by the Gestapo in Aarhus. During interrogation he supplied information about the networks of supply groups in Jutland which resulted in many groups being destroyed and 145 people being arrested, including the Hvidsten Group on 11 March 1944. The resistance movement throughout the peninsula was crippled as supplies dried up. In Aarhus the resistance groups faced another problem as Grethe Bartram from communist and resistance circles in Aarhus was hired as an informant by the Gestapo in March–April 1944. Bartram informed on some 50 resistance members leading to many groups in and around the city being dismantled by German authorities, including the Samsing Group in June 1944.

On 7 October the Gestapo arrested the courier Ruth Phillipsen who worked for the leadership of the Jutland resistance. Vagn Bennike, the chief of operations in Jutland, immediately called an emergency meeting. Plans to assault the Gestapo headquarters were discussed but deemed unfeasible. Bennike finally sent a telegram to his contacts in London,

Undergrunden i Jylland er ved at blive revet op af Gestapo [...] Jeg beder indtrængende om, at kollegium 4 og 5, må blive ødelagt ved luftangreb. (English: The resistance in Jutland is about to be torn up by the Gestapo [...] I insistently ask that dormitories 4 and 5 may be destroyed by aerial attack.)

—

== Planning ==
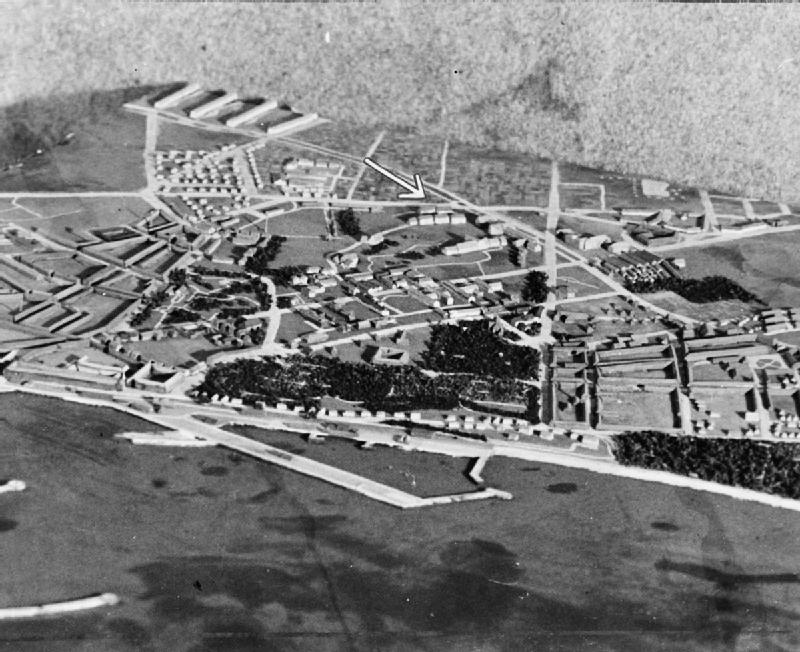
Royal Air Force- 2nd Tactical Air Force, 1943-1945.

The British evaluated the situation and on 26 October 1944 544 Squadron conducted a reconnaissance and the date for the raid was set for 31 October 1944. The attack was planned by members of the British Special Operations Executive and the American Office of Strategic Services. They identified the raid as an especially challenging one because the main targets, the university dormitories in which Gestapo had their headquarters, had civilian hospitals nearby on both sides, so precision was needed to minimise civilian casualties. A training area in 1:1 scale was drawn with chalk, where the pilots picked for the attack made two test runs before the raid.

It was eventually decided that the attack would take place in four waves, about one minute apart. The first two waves would carry regular bombs to blast open the buildings containing the Gestapo offices and the last two waves would attack with incendiary bombs to maximise the damage to the Gestapo archives. The bombs were set to explode with a delay of eleven seconds since in such a low level attack, the bombs had the potential to damage the aircraft that dropped them. It was also decided that it would take place on a work day, between 11:30 a.m. and noon, since few Danish prisoners would be held in the offices at this time, as most of them would have been escorted back to their cells elsewhere on campus for lunch, while the majority of the Gestapo staff would be present and preparing for the lunch break at noon.

Three squadrons were to supply 25 aircraft, 24 Mosquito Mk.VI fighter-bombers and a Mosquito Mk. IV reconnaissance aircraft from the Royal Air Force Film Production Unit, to film the raid. Twelve Mustang Mk. III fighters from 315 (Polish) Squadron would escort them, to defend the bombers from fighters based at the German airbase at Air Base Karup (Grove) and create confusion by attacking minor German targets around central Jutland. All aircraft would carry extra fuel tanks to make sure they could make the flight across the North Sea. The destination and target of the mission were not disclosed to the pilots until their final briefing at 8:00 a.m. on 31 October.

On 30 October, the date and time for the raid was settled for the next day at 11:30 a.m. As a final preparation, the aircraft and crews involved in the raid gathered at the airbase at Swanton Morley in Norfolk at 8:00 a.m. on the day of the attack for a final briefing. When the fighters from 315 (Polish) Squadron landed, it was discovered that four of them had broken tail wheels, so it was decided to proceed with just the remaining eight. At 8:40 a.m., take off began in pairs and at 9:20 a.m., all thirty-three were in the air.

== Bombing ==
The fighter-bombers entered Jutland around the coastal town of Henne around 11:20 a.m. and the Germans were alerted at 11:36 a.m. As planned, 315 Squadron broke off around Grove and 140 Wing continued on towards Skanderborg. At 11:38 a.m., the first wave reached the rendezvous at Skanderborg Lake, followed shortly after by the other three waves. While the other waves circled the lake waiting their turn, the first wave broke off and reached Aarhus in about three minutes. The crews got a sighting of the dorms with the Gestapo offices and dropped 4 long tons (4.1 t) of bombs. At 11:41 a.m., the first bombs exploded and four minutes later, they were followed by the second wave, then the third and fourth, attacking with incendiaries. The later waves were engaged by flak crews from the German light cruiser Nürnberg, present in Aarhus Harbor and a Mosquito from the fourth wave was severely damaged. Instead of returning to base, another Mosquito escorted it across the Kattegat, where it continued on alone to Sweden, landed safely and was destroyed by the crew before they were apprehended by Swedish authorities. The rest of the aircraft exited Danish airspace in their designated waves between 12:16 p.m. and 12:34 p.m.; about two hours later, they landed safely in England.

== Aftermath ==
The Danish underground press estimated that 150–200 Gestapo members and some 30 Danes perished in the attack. An internal German report set their losses from the offices in the dormitories to 39, of whom 27 were SS officers employed in the Gestapo, including Eugen Schwitzgebel. The remaining twelve were from other departments of the German police, mostly office workers. Another 20 German casualties were reported from the Langelandsgade barracks, 18 being soldiers. Three prisoners from the Danish resistance were present for interrogation inside the dorms during the attack: Ruth Philipsen, the resistance leader Harald Sandbæk and a third prisoner. The third prisoner perished in the attack but Philipsen and Sandbæk managed to escape in the confusion. Philipsen got off relatively unscathed but Sandbæk was badly injured and had to receive medical treatment covertly to recover from his wounds. Both of them reached the safety of Sweden soon thereafter.

Though the bombing was precise, destroying Dorms 4 and 5 and doing considerable damage to the Langelandsgade barracks, several bombs missed. The university main building, which was being built at the time, was accidentally struck by a bomb that had somehow managed to skip down the halls of the building, killing about ten builders and injuring the chief architect, C. F. Møller. Most of the Gestapo archives, including many of the files on the Danish resistance, were destroyed in the attack; the extent of the damage remains unknown, though it is clear that the loss of files and experienced personnel severely hampered the Gestapo's efficiency in Denmark. The Gestapo reinforced their numbers in Denmark after the attack, to the point where the number of agents was almost doubled.

== See also ==
- Operation Carthage, a similar attack on Gestapo headquarters in Copenhagen, Denmark
- Operation Jericho, a similar attack on Amiens Prison in France
- Oslo Mosquito Raid (1942), a similar attack on Gestapo headquarters in Oslo, Norway
