= Vesterbro =

Vesterbro may refer to:

- Vesterbro, Copenhagen, an administrative, statistical, and city tax district (bydele) of Copenhagen, Denmark
- Vesterbro, Aarhus, a neighborhood in the city of Aarhus, Denmark
