= Langelandsgade =

Street in Aarhus, Denmark

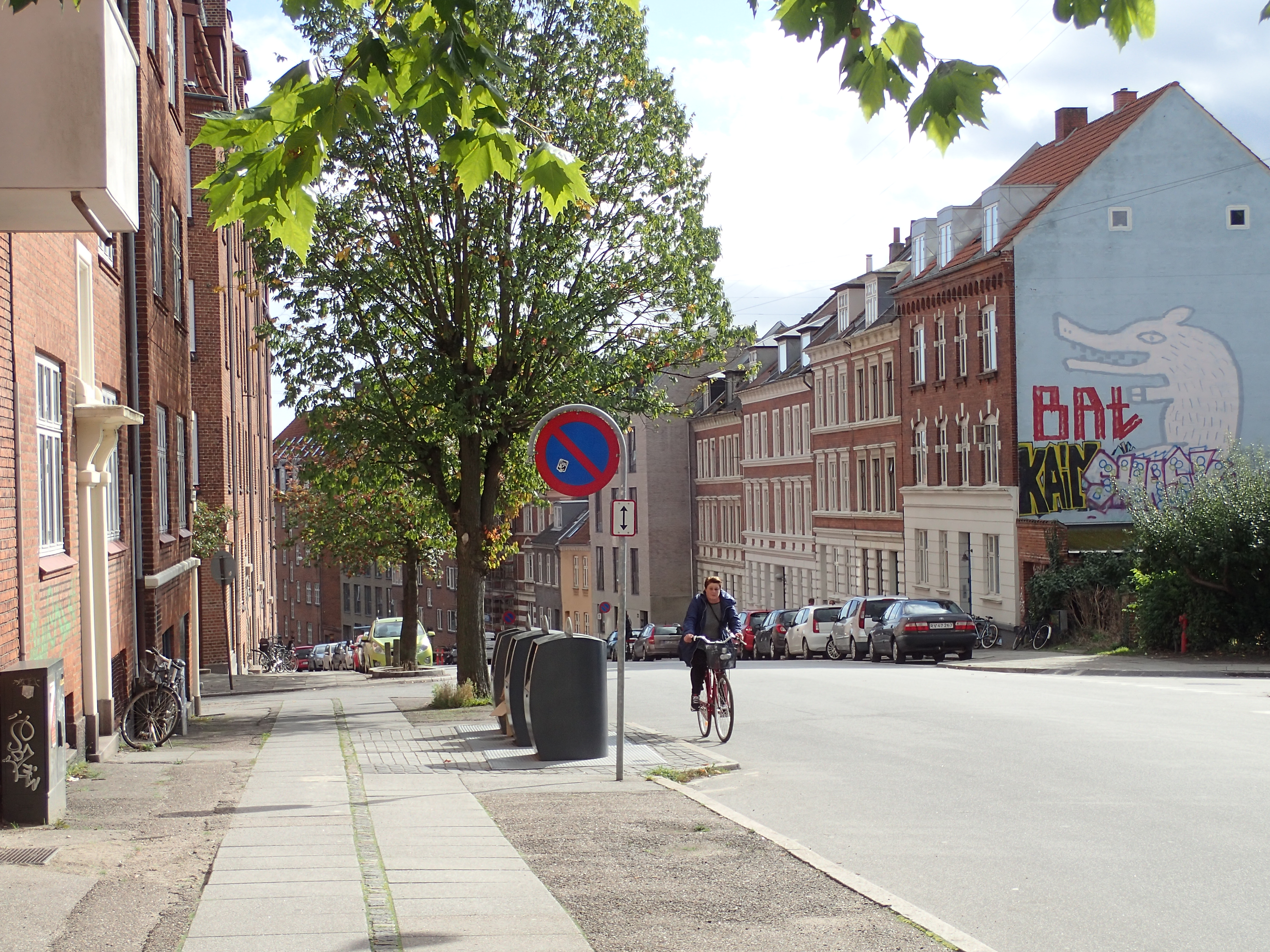
- Langelandsgade, southernmost section
- Interactive map of Langelandsgade
- Length: 1,920 m (6,300 ft)
- Location: Aarhus, Denmark
- Postal code: 8000 and 8200
- Coordinates: 56°09′27.1″N 10°12′04.9″E

Langelandsgade is a street in Aarhus, Denmark.

Langelandsgade runs between the squares and traffic junctions of Vesterbro Torv, in the district of Aarhus C to the south, and Stjernepladsen, in the district of Aarhus N to the north. More than two-thirds of the street traverse the neighbourhood of Vesterbro. The street is close to 2 kilometres long and the southern half section is one of the steepest roads in Aarhus.

Langelandsgade has a long history, it connects important buildings and structures in Aarhus and has a diverse architectural character.

== Name ==
Langelandsgade is named after the Danish island of Langeland and the southern section is part of Øgadekvarteret (The Island Street Quarter), where all streets are named after Danish islands.

== History ==
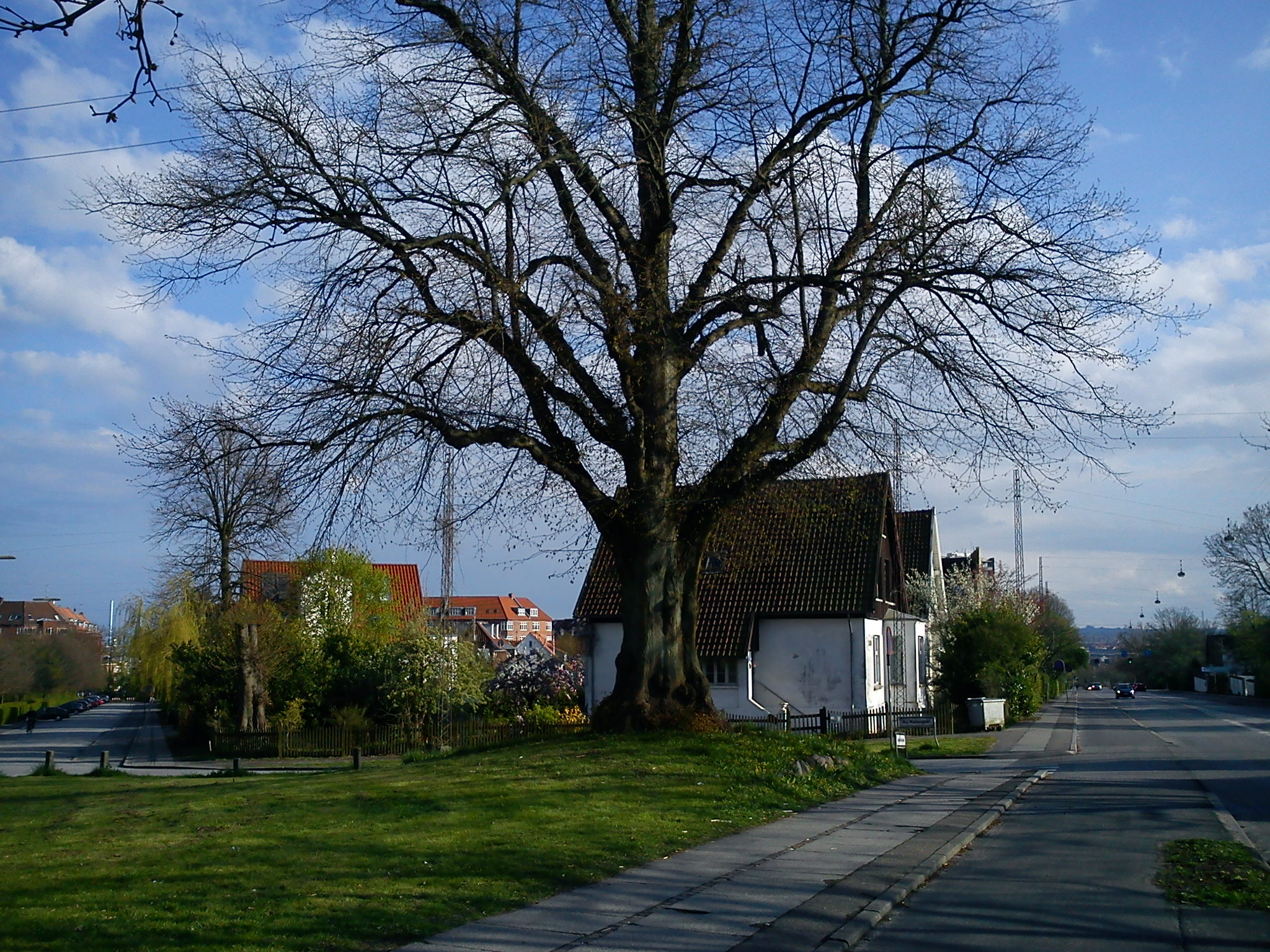
Galgebakken, the former medieval gallows hill of Aarhus at the intersection of Langelandsgade and Ny Munkegade.

Langelandsgade originated as field roads in the Middle Ages and was originally referred to as "the road behind the city". Around 1600 AD, executions by hanging were relocated from the central square of Store Torv (in front of the cathedral) to a hill along present days Langelandsgade, then far out of town. The gallows hill was abandoned in the late 1700s. In 1828, a brickworks was built along the southern end, and the road became known as Teglværksvej (Brickworks-road) for some time, but was officially named Brendstrupvej until 1899, when it was renamed to Langelandsgade.

The first residential buildings were built in the 1880s and consisted of 2–3 storey apartment blocks in brick in the southernmost section and a few detached houses close to where the university is located nowadays. Some of them still exists. The brickworks was abandoned in 1917, and in 1921–27 the first large housing block on Langelandsgade was built on the site. The public housing apartment block was named Teglgården (The-brick-house), after the former brickworks. It was one of the first building projects to be realised by the local non-profit housing organization Arbejdernes Andels Boligforening (AAB – Aarhus).

Large sections along Langelandsgade remained undeveloped up until the 1960s when the modernist apartment blocks of Klostervangen (1968) and Vestervang (1970 and 1985) was built.

== Facilities ==
Langelandsgade is an important road for transportation in Aarhus and connects the inner city to the ring road of Ring 1 and the intercity motorway of Randersvej. Many notable structures and facilities are placed along Langelandsgade, including:

- Sankt Markus Church
- Aarhus Botanical Gardens
- Aarhus University
  - Langelandsgade Kaserne
  - The iNano House
  - AU Library departments (The Book Tower (Bogtårnet) is a city landmark)
  - Studenternes Hus, a student house and event venue (Stakladen).

== Gallery ==
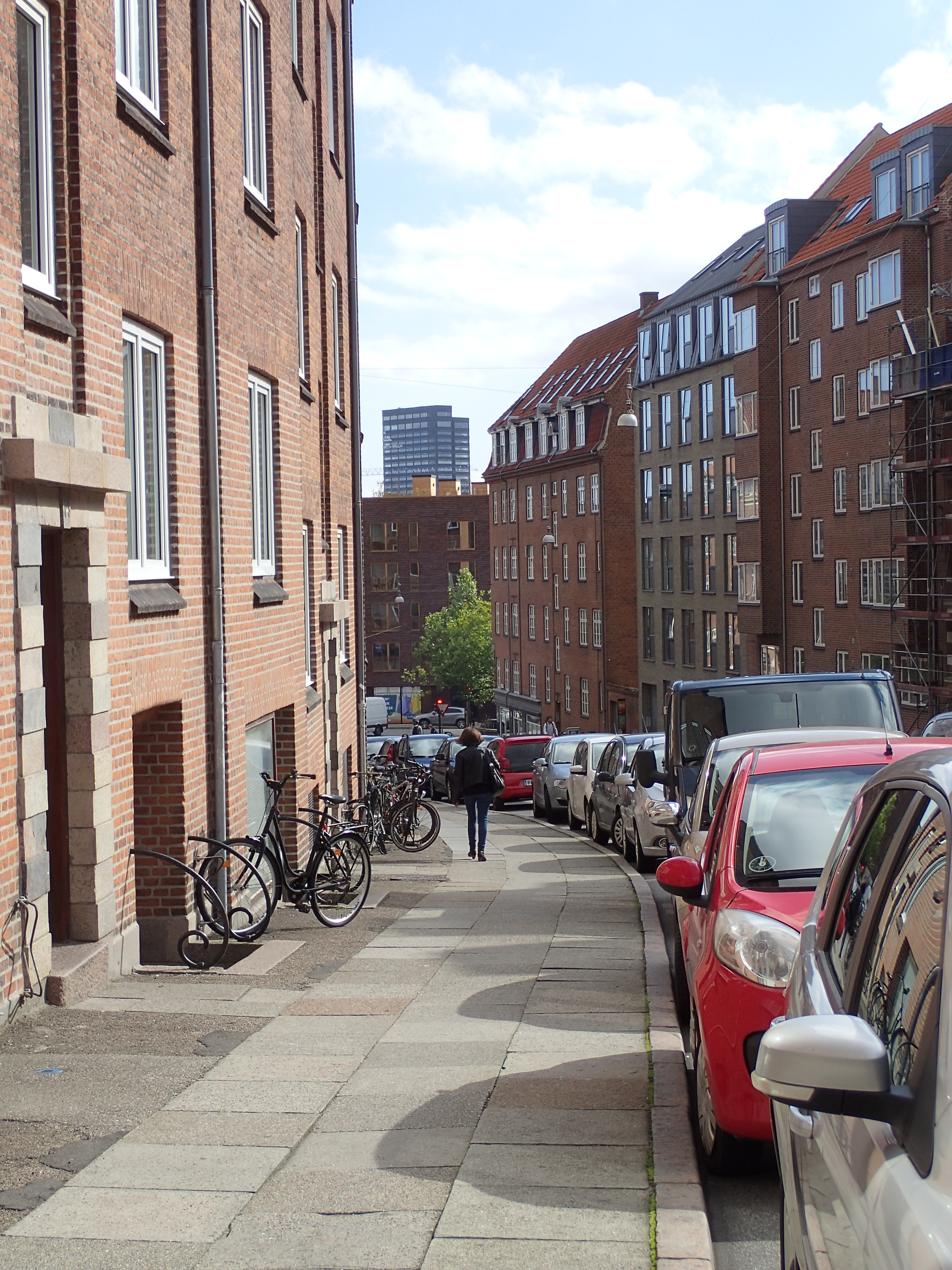
Southern end

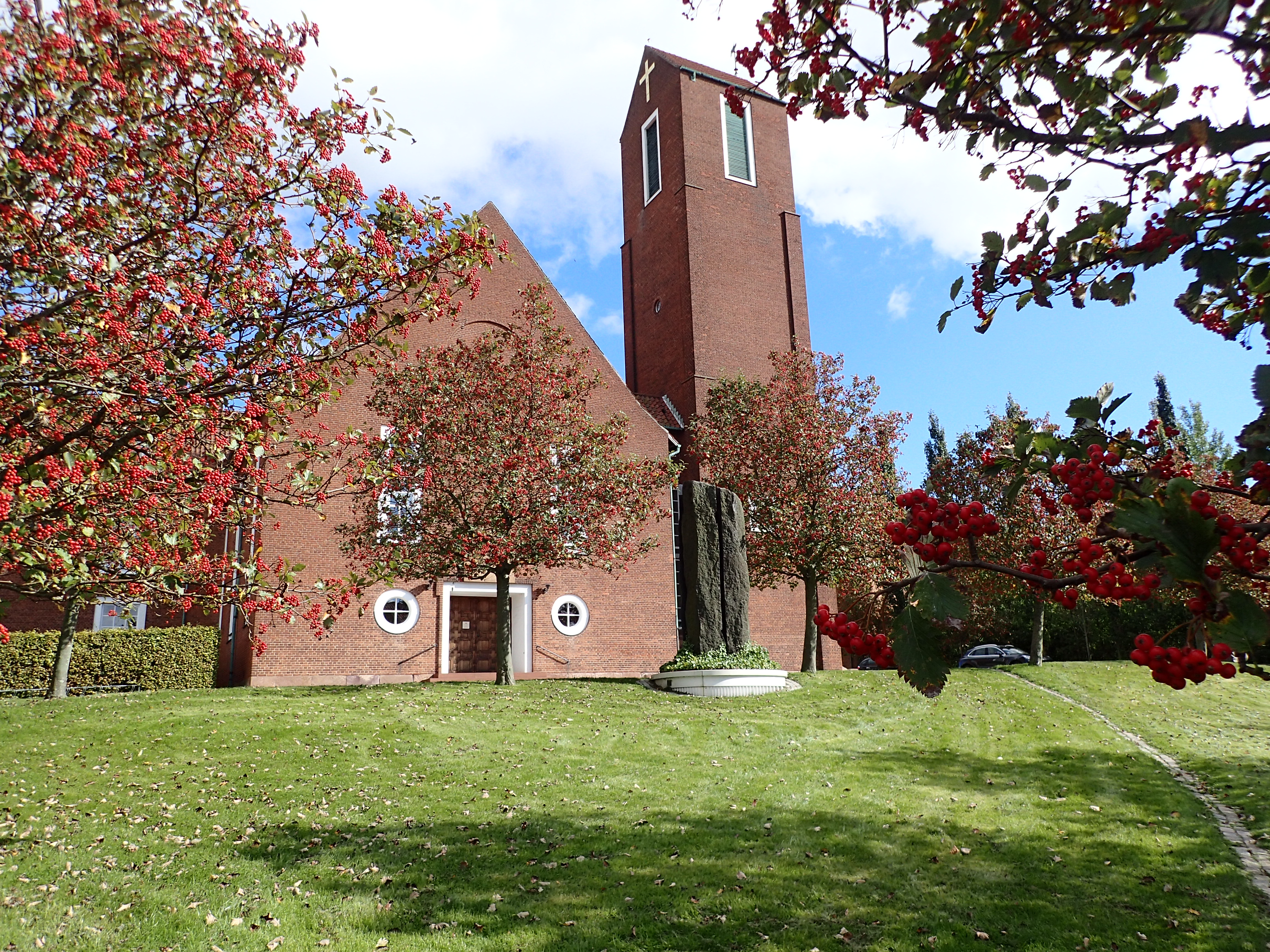
St. Mark's Church

Klostervangen

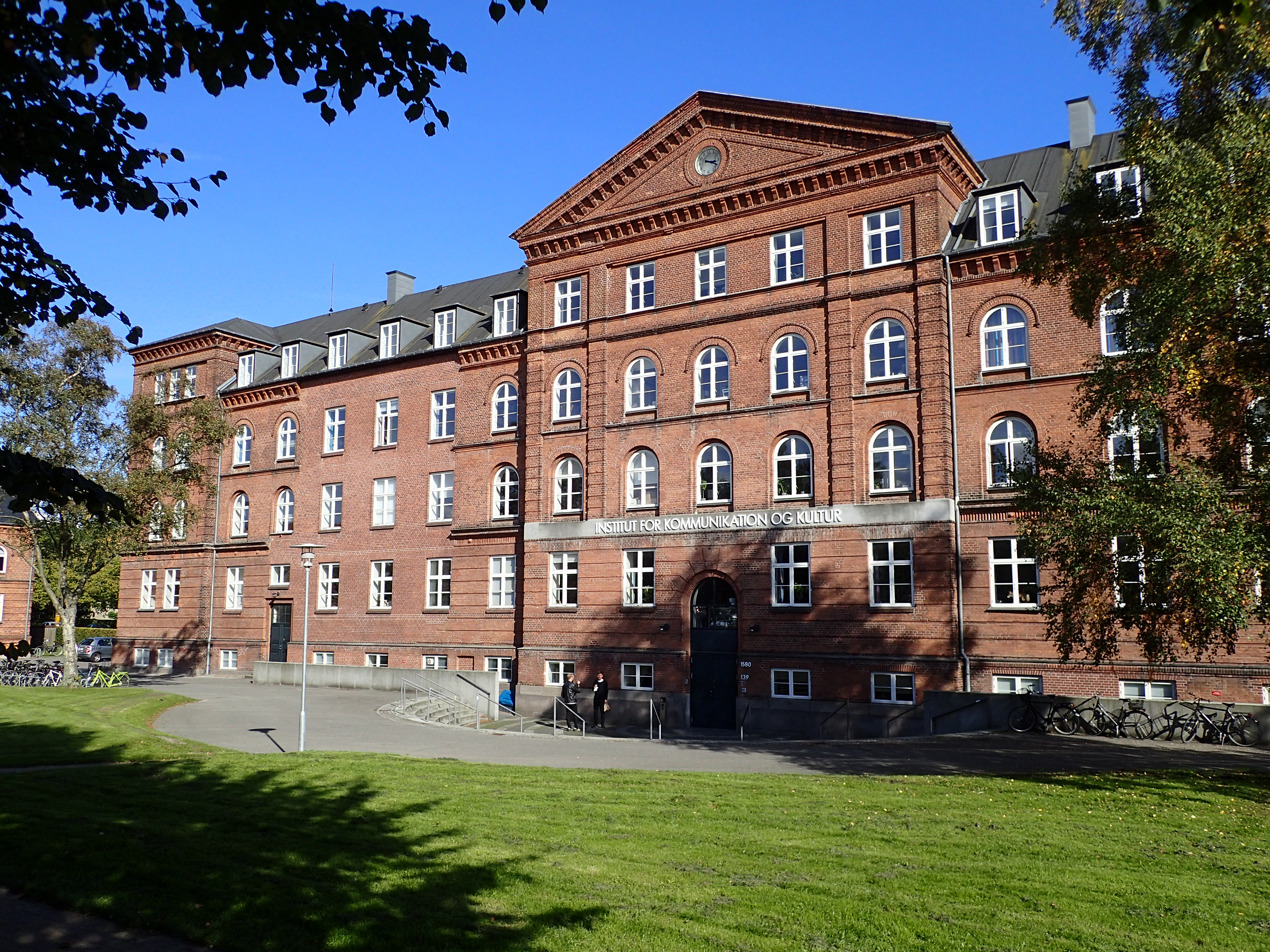
Langelandsgades Kaserne, former military barracks from 1889, now part of Aarhus University.

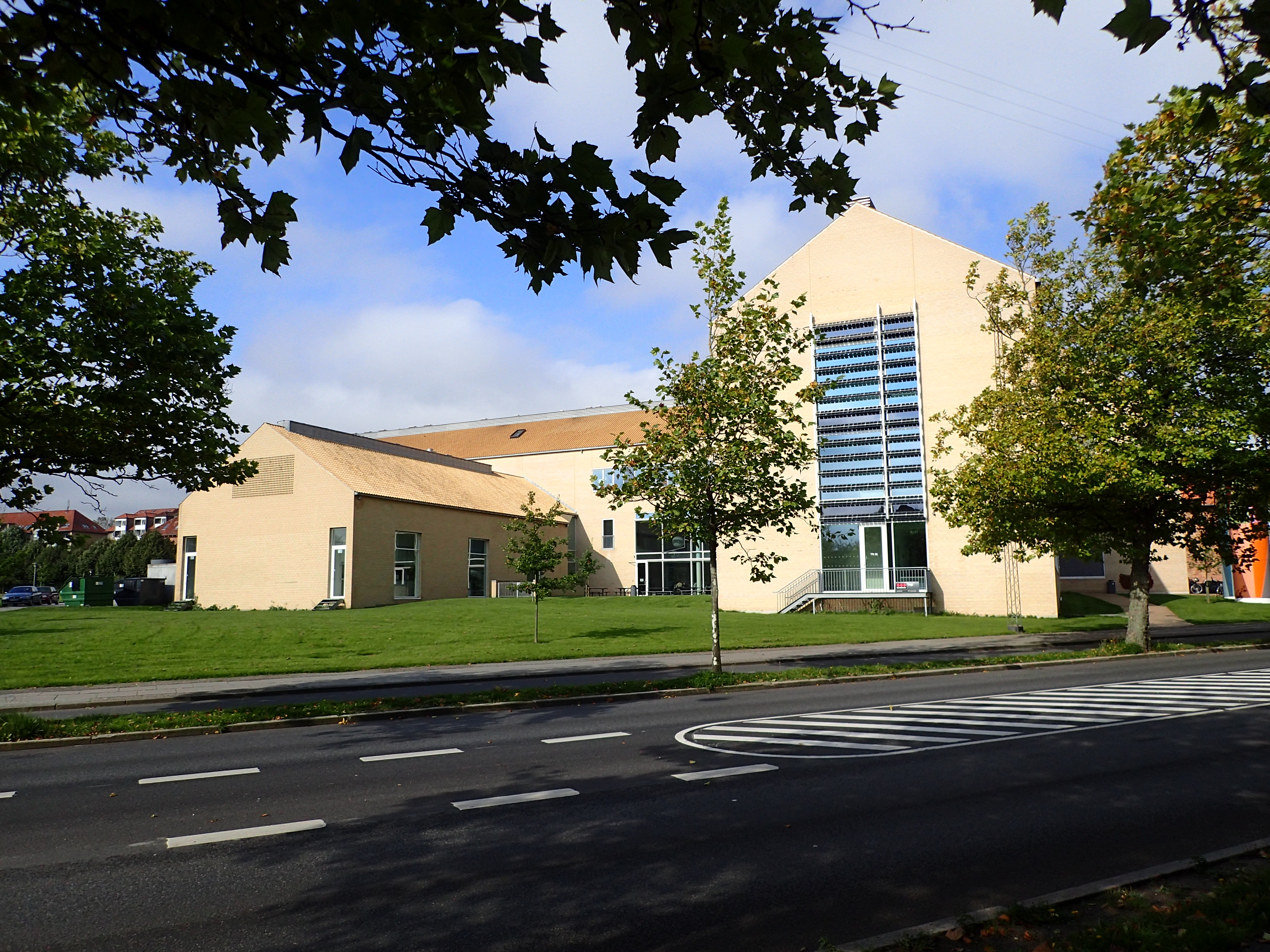
The iNano House

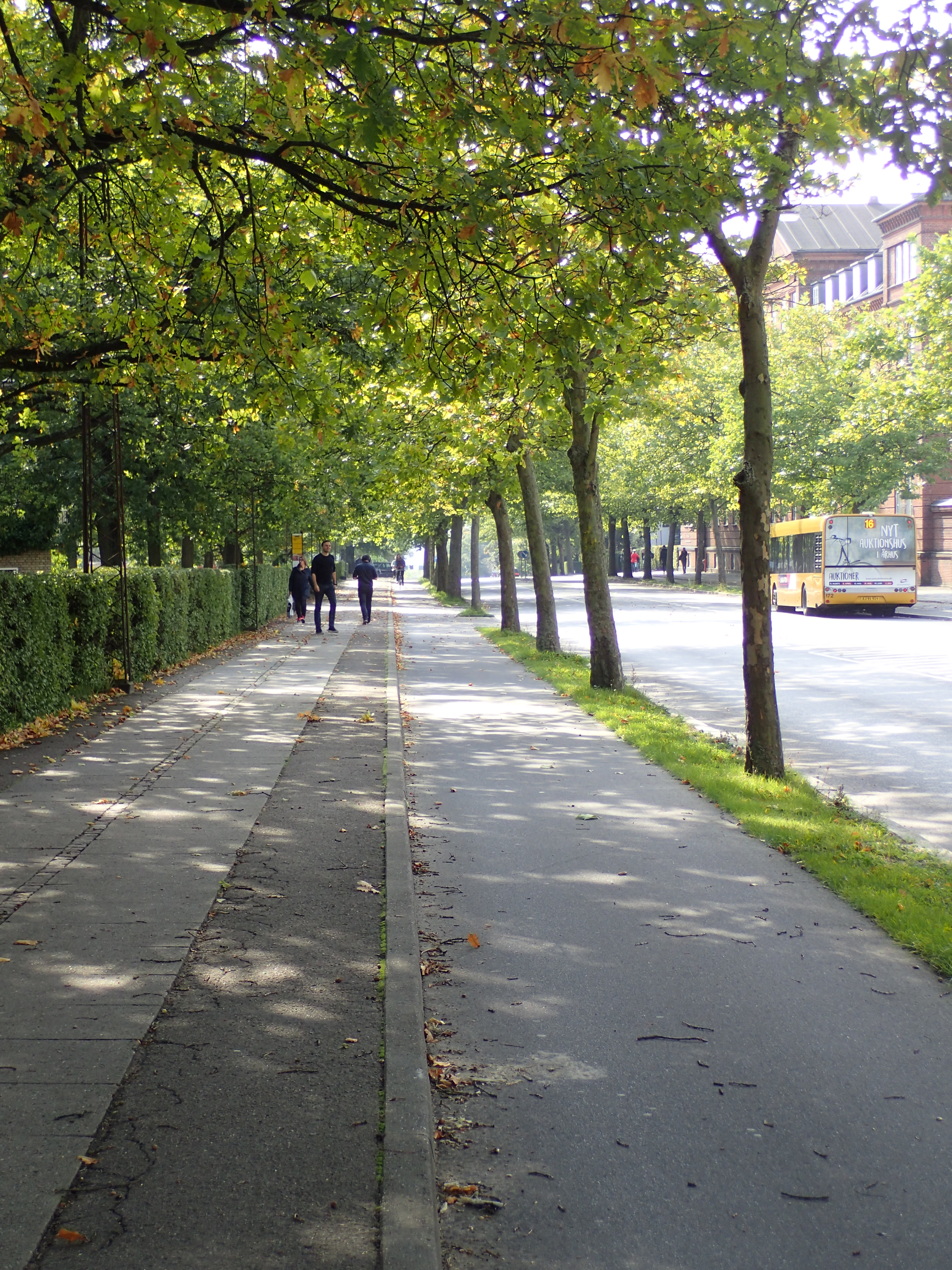
Sidewalks and bike lane at the university campus

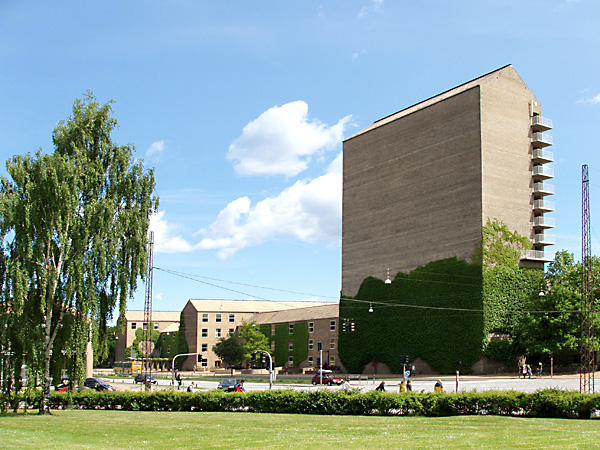
The Book Tower, Aarhus University

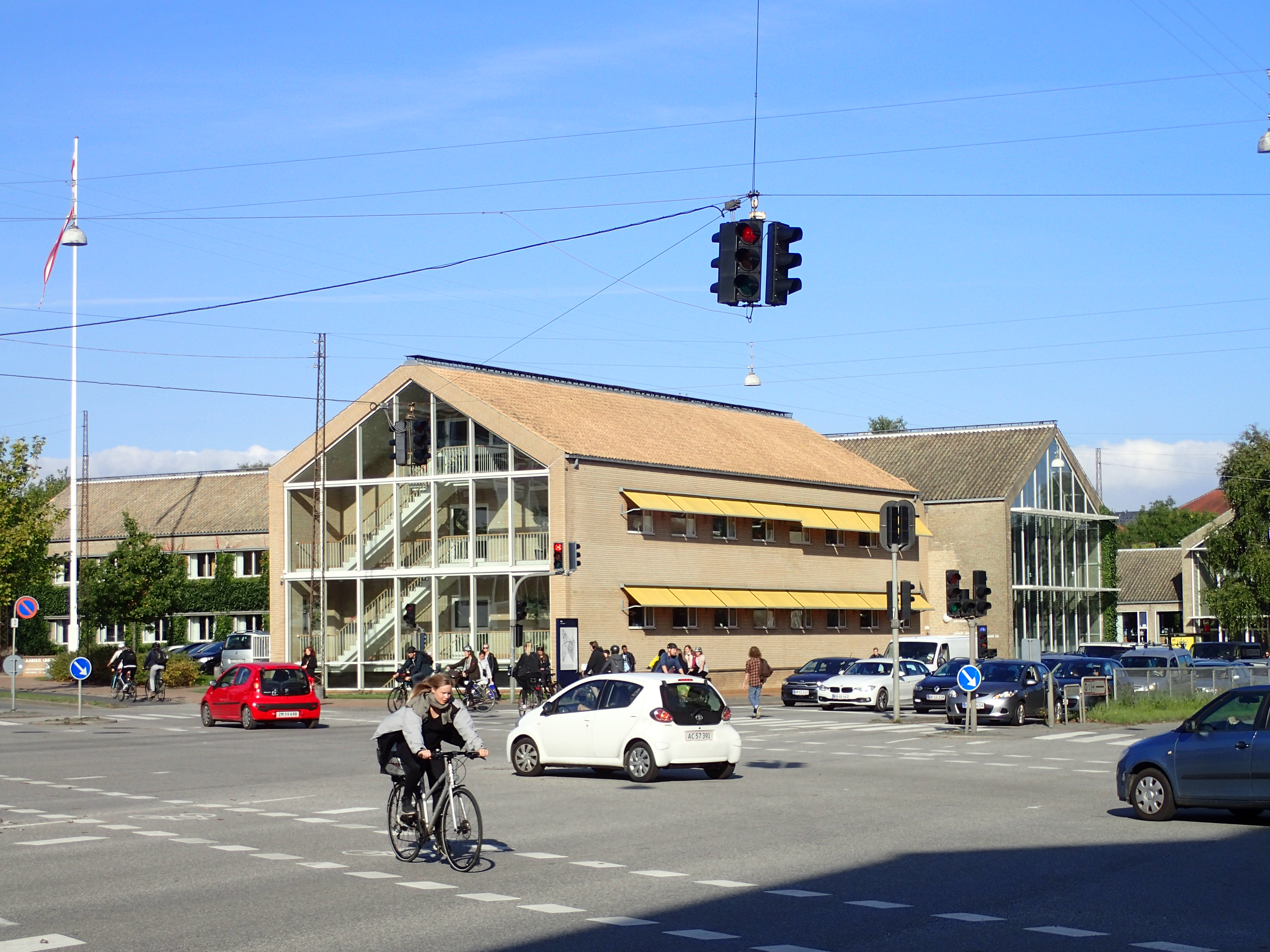
Studenternes Hus at the Nordre Ringgade intersection

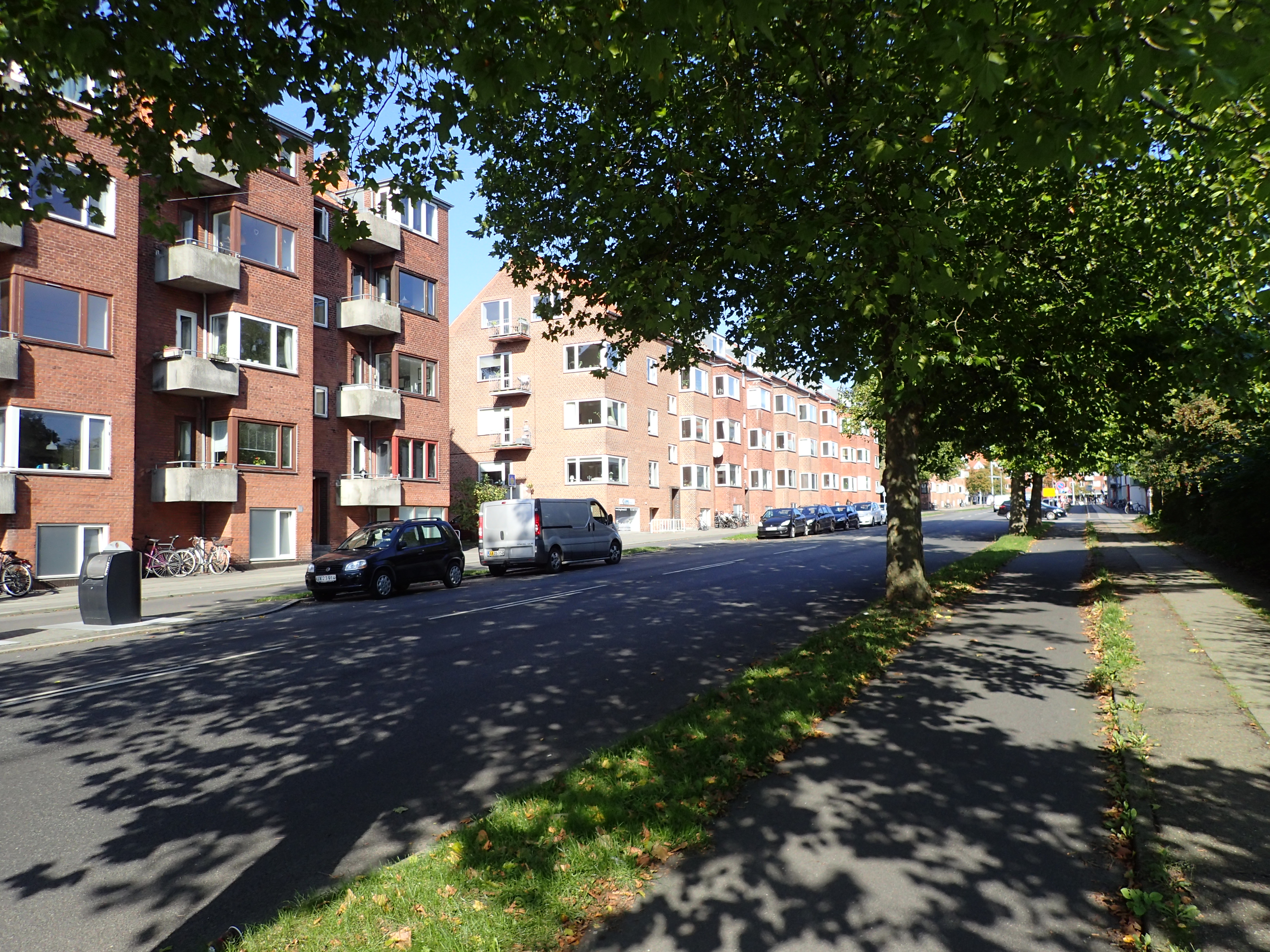
Northern end

== Sources ==
- "Langelandsgade" (in Danish). Aarhus Municipality.
