= Vesterbro Torv =

Public square in Aarhus, Denmark

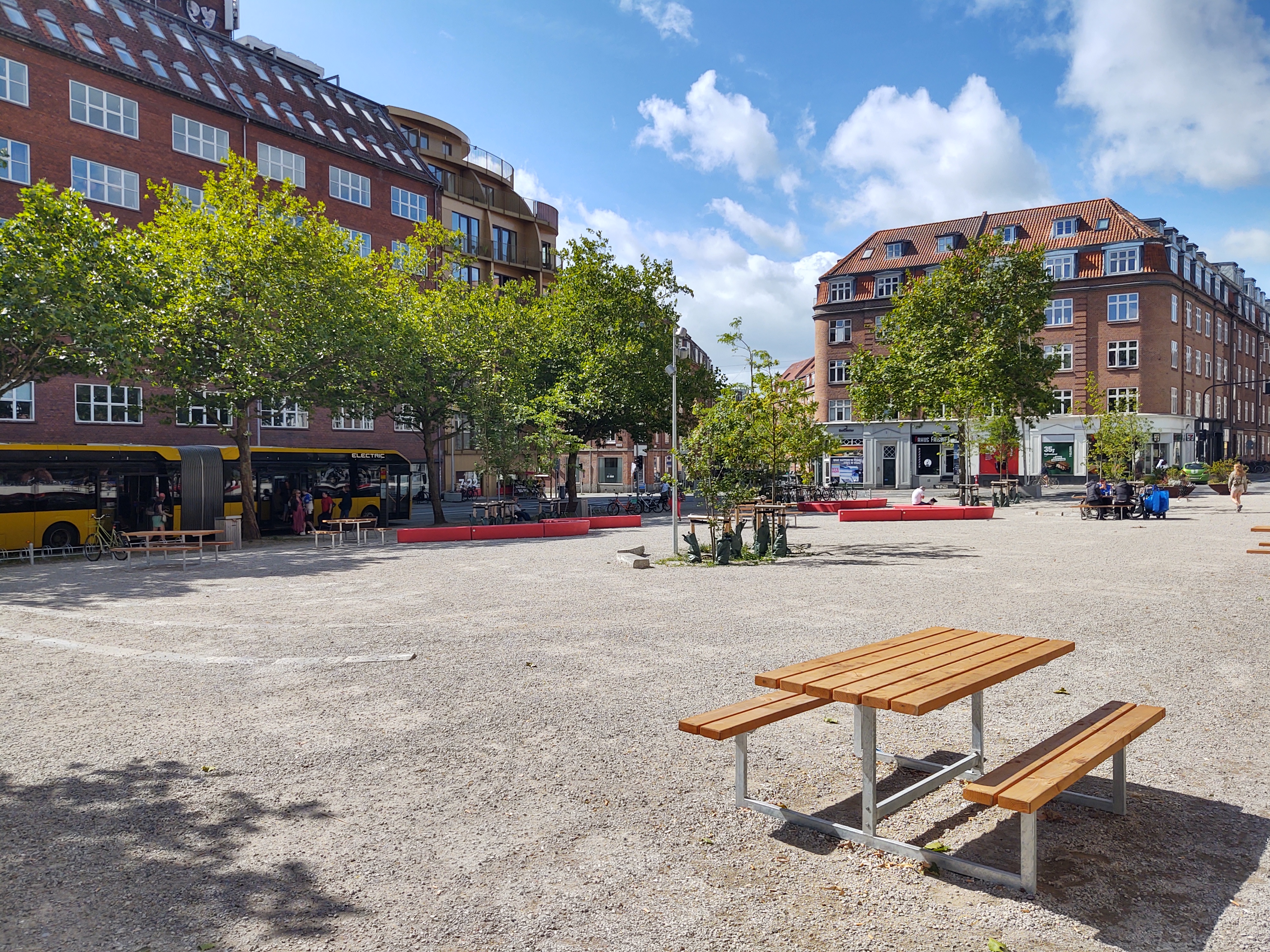
- Vesterbro Torv (2024)
- Location: Vesterbro, Aarhus, Denmark
- Postal code: 8000
- Coordinates: 56°09′29.4″N 10°11′56.1″E

Vesterbro Torv (Note: lit.: "Western-faubourg Square". The term "bro" (or "bro-kvarter") is used in many placenames of Danish cities, such as Nørre Stenbro, Nørrebro, Vesterbro or Østerbro. The word is used for neighbourhoods close to, but outside, the inner city, inspired by the French concept of faubourgs. The term has been in use for many years, and many neighbourhoods that was originally outside the inner city has now become part of it.) is a public square in the Vesterbro neighborhood of Aarhus, Denmark. It is at the junction of 8 streets; Vesterbrogade, Hjortensgade, Langelandsgade, Teglværksgade, Nørre Allé, Vesterport, Vester Allé and Janus la Cours Gade.

The formerly heavily trafficked square was rebuilt in 2024, as part of a bigger development plan to ease motor traffic from the central city. The new design installed more street furniture and recreational space. The square is expecting a second phase of rebuilding.

== History ==
Vesterbro Torv was in the early 1800s an unused area south of the road leading to Viborg. During the 1840s the area was gradually used as a market place when the cattle trade was moved from an area by the city gate Frederiksport . The area is mentioned in different sources of the time as Kvægtorvet (Cattle market) and later Grisetorvet (Pig market). In the 1880s permanent stalls for sheep and pigs where installed and the area was paved in cobblestones surrounded by a banister. In 1890 the square was named Vesterbro Torv for the neighborhood Vesterbro that had grown up around it. The cattle trade continued until 1907 when it was moved to Aarhus Offentlige Slagtehus (Aarhus Public Slaughterhouse) which had opened in 1895. In 1913 the local beautification association began work to renovate the square. Funds were collected from the people living in the area which yielded 1000 DKK, the association itself gave 500 DKK and the city council contributed another 500 DKK.

In the 1950s the square was substantially altered when underground parking garages were built and a monumental office building was constructed on the south side of the square. The older buildings around the square was gradually replaced over the following years and in 1976 the last large building was constructed on Vesterbro Torv no. 10. The only original building from the 1800s is a corner building by Vesterport. In 2016 one of the two last low 1- and 2-story buildings were demolished to make way for a 5-story residential building while proposals to redevelop the remaining building was passing review in the city council.
