= Harald Sandbæk =

Danish priest and resistance worker (1904–1986)

Harald Sandbæk (6 January 1904 – 6 November 1986) was a Danish theologian, author and resistance fighter. He culminated his career as provost of Holmen, Copenhagen, from 1962 to 1973. During the German occupation of Denmark in the Second World War, he was a member of the Danish resistance in Aarhus before joining Den Danske Brigade (the Danish Brigade) in Sweden.

Sandbæk matriculated from Odense Cathedral School in 1924 and graduated in theology in 1931. In 1932 he became the parish priest of Hersom-Bjerregrav-Klejtrup. He was a regular contributor to the journal Det tredje Standpunkt.

During the Second World War, Sandbæk played an active role in the Danish resistance movement as a member of Den Danske Brigade, 3rd battalion. He took part in rail sabotage in Jutland and was arrested by the Gestapo on 15 September 1944 and tortured. He was one of those held at the Gestapo headquarters in Aarhus when it was bombed by the British on 31 October 1944. He was badly wounded but escaped. He was secretly treated in hospital and later moved to Sweden where he served in Den Danske Brigade in Norrköping.

After WWII, Sandbæk became Secretary of the Ecumenical Refugee Commission in Geneva (1947–1949) and secretary-general for the Church of Denmark's refugee assistance service (1949–1950). In 1957, he was parish priest at Copenhagen's Kastelskirken and became provost of Holmen in 1962 until 1973. He published his memoirs Præst, sabotør, flygtningearbejder in 1983.

Harald Sandbæk died on 6 November 1986. He is buried in Holmen Cemetery, Copenhagen.

== See also ==
- Aarhus Air Raid

== Literature ==
- Sandbæk, Harald; Rald, Niels Jørgen (1945). Den danske Kirke under Besættelsen (in Danish).
- Sandbæk, Harald (1983). Præst, sabotør, flygtningearbejder. Samlerens Forl.
