= Eugen Schwitzgebel =

Eugen Schwitzgebel (1900 – 31 October 1944, in Aarhus) was a German officer, a SS Sturmbannführer and Gestapo leader in Aarhus during the Second World War. He was described as "short, stocky Bavarian" who was a "ruthless and impatient man who loved to terrorize his subordinates". He was killed when British airmen bombed the University of Aarhus building which was being used as the Gestapo headquarters and place for keeping the Danish archives.
