= Langelandsgade Kaserne =

Former barracks in Denmark

Coordinates: 56.1675°N 10.1975°E

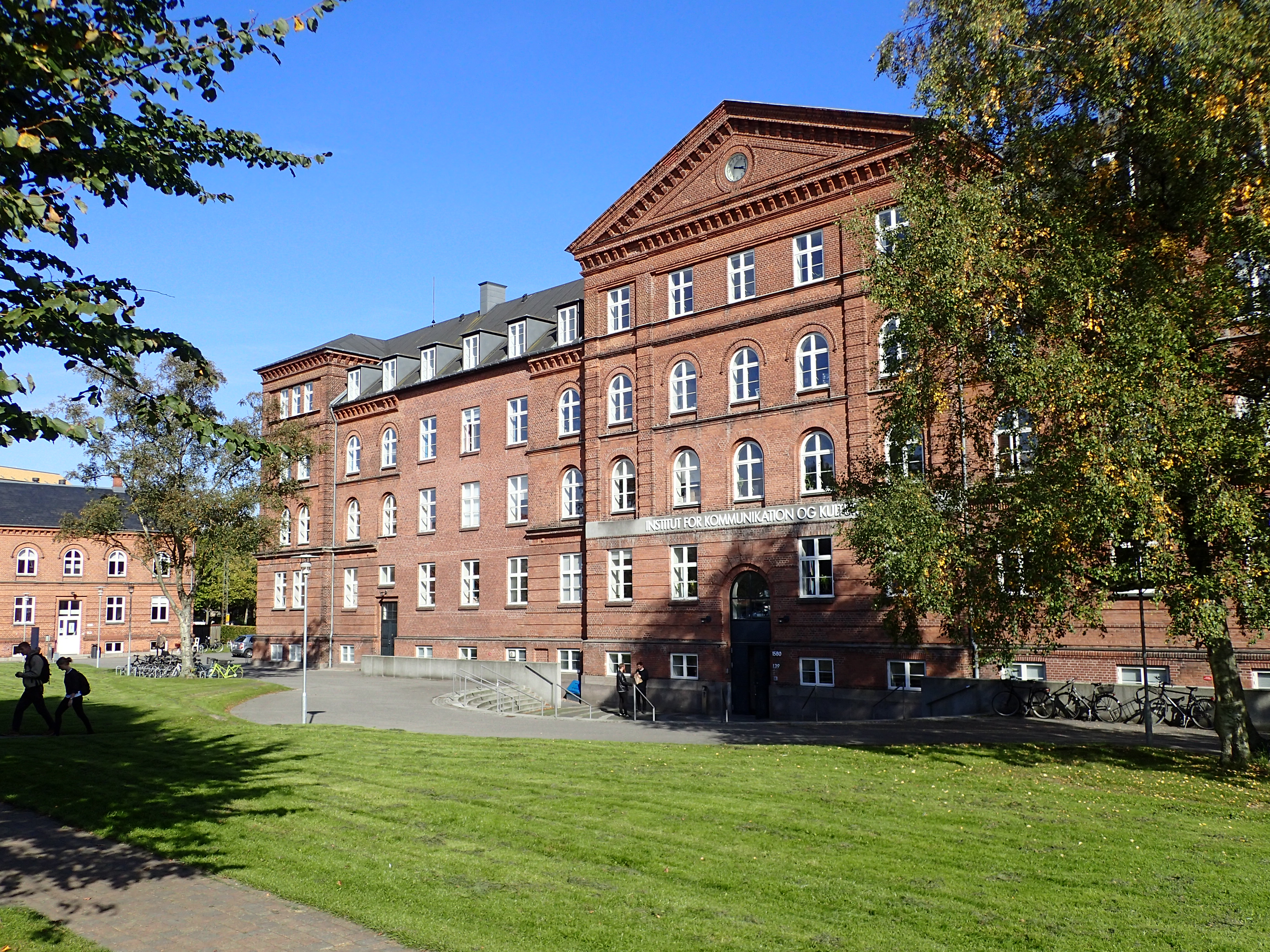
Langelandsgades Kaserne, School of Communication and Culture (Aarhus University)

Langelandsgade Kaserne is a former military barracks in Aarhus, Denmark. It was used by the military from 1889 to 1993, when Aarhus University took ownership. After a restoration, it is now the headquarters of the Aarhus University department School of Communication and Culture (Aarhus Universitet, Institut for Kommunikation og Kultur).

== History ==
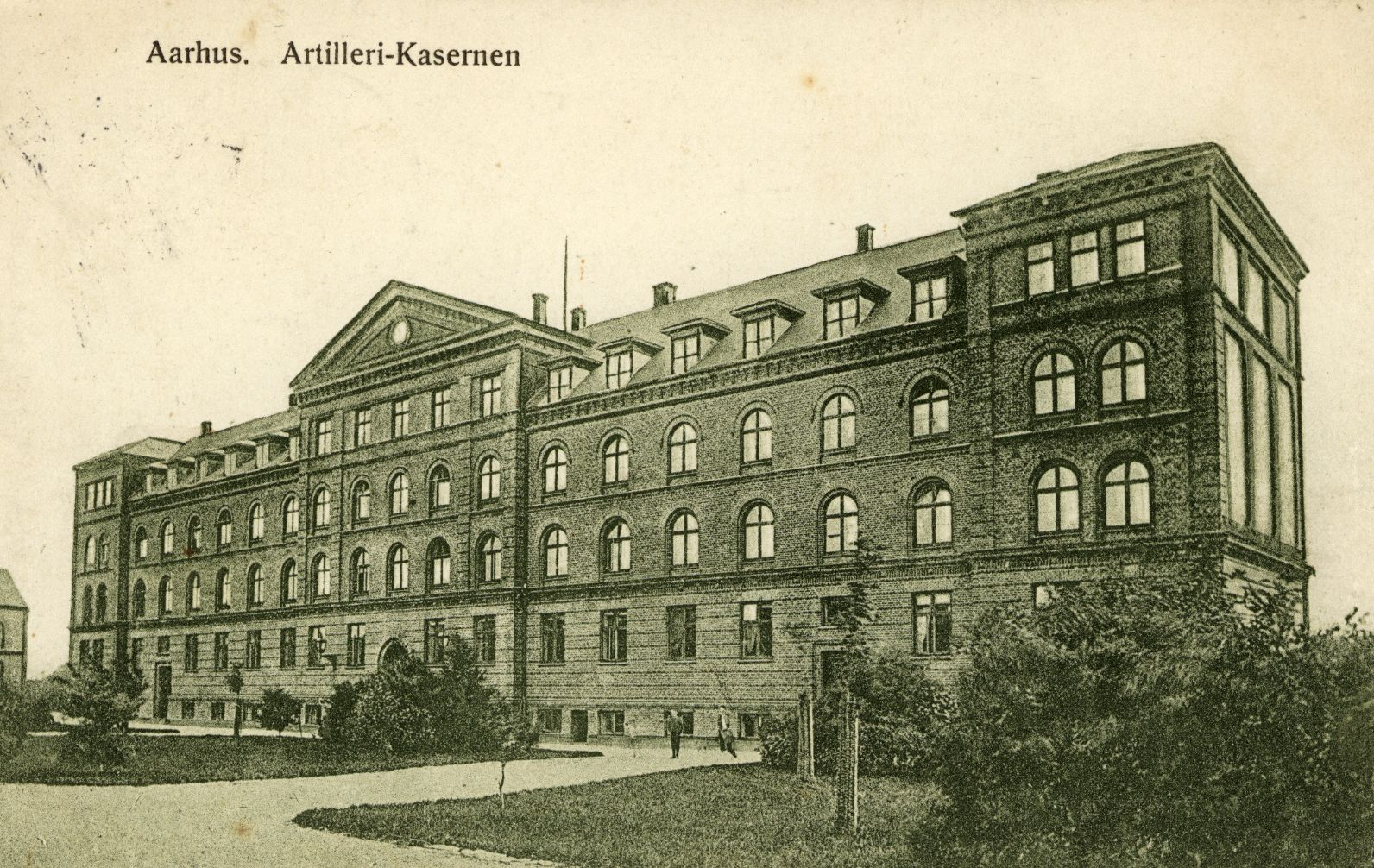
Langelandsgades Kaserne, Artillerikasernen ca. 1908

Langelandsgade Kaserne is the oldest intact barracks still standing in Denmark. It was one of several barracks constructed in Aarhus in the late 19th century and was originally intended to house an artillery regiment. The building was designed by the architects Agathon Just Müllertz (1842-1909) and Sophus Frederik Kühnel (1851-1930). Construction began in 1887 and was finished in 1889. The building has three floors and a loft and basement. The basement housed the sutler, while the first floor was used for offices and study rooms. The second and third floors and the loft were mainly reserved to house the soldiers. Along with the main building there were stables, a workshop, an ammunition depot and homes for officers and the barracks commandant.

During the occupation of Denmark during World War II, the barracks was confiscated by German military forces. On 9 April 1940 the first German forces arrived, and wooden barracks were quickly erected in the courtyard. On 31 October 1944, the Gestapo headquarters in the nearby university buildings was bombed by the British Royal Air Force, and Langelandsgade Kaserne was severely damaged. Twenty Germans, of whom eighteen were soldiers, were killed, two stable buildings and the workshop were destroyed, and the main building sustained heavy damage.

In 1978 the last military contingent, Jydske Telegrafregiment, moved to Fredericia, and only administrative staff remained until 1993, when Aarhus University took over the buildings. Since then the Department of Aesthetics and Communication has had its home there.

== Time Line ==
- 1889–1923: 3rd Artillery Brigade
- 1923–1940: 3rd Field Artillery Brigade
- 1923–1932: 14th and 15th Artillery Brigades
- 1932–1937: 8th Artillery Brigade
- 1932–1940: From the dragoon regiment in Randers, an armored car company and a motorcycle squadron
- 1937–1940: 14th Air Defense Artillery Brigade
- 1940–1945: Occupied by German military
- 1949–1950: 2nd Telegraph Training Battalion
- 1951-1969: Jutland Telegraph Regiment
- 1969: 3rd Artillery Brigade moved to Skive
- 1978: Only administrative staff remaining until 1989
- 1993: Taken over by Aarhus University

== See also ==
- Langelandsgade
- Vester Allés Kaserne
