= Samsing Group =

Danish resistance group

- Samsing-gruppen
- Leader: Willy Samsing
- Dates active: June 1943 – June 1944
- Headquarters: Aarhus, Denmark
- Wars: Second World War

The Samsing Group (Danish: Samsing-gruppen) was a Danish resistance group in Aarhus, Denmark, active from June 1943 until 6 June 1944. The group consisted of Willy Samsing, his three brothers and 10–12 other men. The group conducted some 60 large and small sabotage actions in and around Aarhus and were the driving force behind resistance operations in the city in the early years. In addition to sabotage the group collected weapons and supplies airdropped by the allies and supplied them to other groups in Jutland. In 1944 the group was dismantled by the German authorities and its members arrested. The group worked with a loosely based group of university students that had been active since 1942.

== History ==
Germany invaded and occupied Denmark on 9 April 1940, as part of Operation Weserübung. In June 1941 Germany invaded the Soviet Union and the Danish government subsequently arrested Danish communists and signed the Communist Law on 22 August 1941, forcing many communists to either flee or go underground. Willy Samsing (Codename: Frandsen) was the local leader of the Communist Party of Denmark in Trøjborg. With his three brothers he founded a small group of resistance fighters with communist leanings. The group conducted their first operation on 22 March 1943, and their last in May 1944. On 10–11 August 1943, the group conducted one their larger operations, across nine locations across Aarhus, which may have contributed to the August Crisis.

In May 1944, the Danish resistance was, through a radio broadcast from England, given orders to destroy the electricity plant in Aarhus. Vagn Bennike, who headed the resistance in Jutland at the time, assigned the Samsing Group to the task and gave the order to start planning. The director of the electricity plant happened to also be associated with the resistance and supplied schematics and advice but also pointed out the action could leave the city without power for up to 3–4 years. Willy Samsing subsequently decided against the operation and it was never carried out. After the war documents have shown the order was given without consultation with the Freedom Council.

In April 1944, three members of the group were sent to Højbjerg to intimidate and discourage a civilian that collaborated with the German occupation forces. The group entered the residence where they encountered the wife and 17-year-old son, but not the man they had come for. The group left without harming anyone but on 8 May, the son identified Harry Samsing to the Danish police which promptly arrested him. Four days later on 12 May, two additional members were arrested. It was at this time Grethe Bartram begun her employ as an informant for the Gestapo and she informed on another member during this period. By September, most members of the group were in custody.

The group were eventually deported to Frøslev Prison Camp and later Neuengamme concentration camp. The survivors were repatriated by the White Buses in 1945, but Willy Samsing had contracted typhoid. He later died in the epidemiological hospital in Helsingborg on 26 April 1945.

Events on 10–11 August 1943

- 23.00 Workshop in Vejlby set on fire.
- 23.57 German bus in a mechanics shop on Trøjborg.
- 24.00 Large fire in a German store house in Østergade.
- 00.30 Fire in carpenters workshop in Knudris Gade.
- 00.38 Fire in the Aarhus Yacht docks in Fiskerihavnen.
- 01.30 Fire in a saddlery workshop in Studsgade.
- 04.20 Fire in a German cargo wagon in Trøjborg.
- - Two military barracks blown up at Brendstrupgaard.

== Sources ==
- Hansen, Solomon (1946). Jyske Sabotører: Willy Samsing-Gruppen. Jydsk Centraltryk.
- Lundh, Hedda (2002). Ikke noget theselskab: Var vi terrorister? [No Tea Party: Were We Terrorists?] (in Danish). Afterword by Marianne Alenius. Copenhagen: Museum Tusculanums Forlag. ISBN 87-7289-736-8.
- Hauerbach, Sven (1945). 5. Kolonne; Aarhus-sabotørernes modige indsats. Published by 5 Kolonne. Archived from the original on 15 April 2016.
