= Communist Law =

The Communist Law or The Law on Prohibition Against Communist Associations and Communist Activities was an unconstitutional piece of Danish legislation passed under Nazi occupation on 22 August 1941 which banned the Communist Party of Denmark and other communist parties and organisations in Denmark. The Communist Law was a Danish adoption of the international Anti-Comintern Pact.

== Prehistory ==
The communist party was allowed to continue its activities after German troops had invaded Denmark on 9 April 1940. Prior to the occupation, Danish secret police had registered active communists. After the occupation these registries was turned over to the German authorities.

On 22 June 1941 Germany declared war on the Soviet Union and the German occupation authorities in Denmark demanded the arrest of leading Danish communists. The names of those communists came from the registries that had been handed over by Danish police. The police arrested 295 communists including communist members of parliament.

There was no warrant for these arrests in Danish law and on 22 August 1941 the Communist Law was passed unanimously in parliament and signed by king Christian X with retroactive effect.

== Constitutionality ==
The Communist Law was a violation of several parts of the Constitution of Denmark, hereunder the freedom of speech, freedom of association, the inviolability of parliament and the demand for a jury in political trials.

In the 1953 constitutional reform, a new section was added to the Danish constitution which explicitly forbids incarceration on grounds of political views alone and thus a new Communist Law.

== Cultural references ==
The novel Frydenholm by Hans Scherfig tells a fictionalised account of the incarcerated communists.

== See also ==
- Horserød camp

== Sources ==
- Kaarsted, Tage (1977). De Danske Ministerier 1929–1953, Copenhagen. pp. 173 ff. ISBN 8774928961. (in Danish)
- "Kommunistlejren [The Communist Camp]". Folkedrab.dk (in Danish). Danish Institute for International Studies (DIIS). 23 September 2015.
