= Grethe Bartram =

Danish wartime collaborator

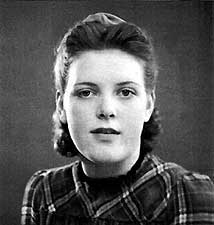
- Grethe Bartram in 1942
- Born: Maren Margrethe Thomsen; 23 February 1924; Aarhus, Denmark
- Died: 23 January 2017 (aged 92); Vessigebro, Sweden
- Other names: Thora, Maren Margrethe Bartram
- Known for: Informed on at least 53 people from the Danish resistance movement during the Second World War
- Status: Deceased
- Conviction: Treason
- Penalty: Death; commuted to life imprisonment

Maren Margrethe Thomsen, known as Maren Margrethe "Grethe" Bartram and "Thora" (23 February 1924 – 23 January 2017), was a Danish woman who informed on at least 53 people from the Danish resistance movement during the Second World War, resulting in the early communist resistance groups being dismantled and many of their members being sent to Nazi concentration camps. Bartram informed on her brother, husband and close acquaintances.

Bartram was sentenced to death for treason after the war. The sentence was commuted to life in prison in 1947. In 1956 she was released and moved to Halland in Sweden where she lived under her married name.

== Background ==
Grethe Bartram was born in Aarhus, and grew up in a poor household, the second of eight children; both her parents were members of the Communist Party of Denmark (DKP), as were the social circles of the family. Her father, Niels Peter Christopher Bartram (born 1896), was from southern Jutland and participated in World War I on the German side. He suffered from shellshock from the war and found it difficult to work but managed to operate a small bicycle repair shop in Midtbyen, Aarhus.

Bartram left school at 13 years old and started working until she became pregnant at 16 and was married on 12 July 1941 to a young machinist, Frode Thomsen (born 28 March 1920) from her workplace. The marriage did not last long, ending in the summer of 1943, and their son was put into foster care with her mother-in-law.

== Informant ==
Bartram's family, including her older brother Christian Bartram, became involved with the resistance. In September 1942 the Danish police put up a DKK 1000 kr. reward for information regarding a sabotage fire in a shop in Fredericiagade in Aarhus. Through her brother, Bartram learned who had been involved and gave the information to the police. Five people were arrested, including her brother. One escaped and the remainder were sentenced to between one and ten years in prison.

Thereafter, Bartram participated in illegal activities with people involved with the resistance movement. In March–April 1944, she was hired as an agent by the Gestapo and in June the Samsing Group and an affiliated group of University students were arrested and eventually deported to Neuengamme concentration camp. The communist resistance groups in Aarhus and across central Jutland were essentially neutralized.

Resistance members still had high confidence in Bartram at the time and in August 1944 she was sent to Copenhagen as a representative to establish new leadership for the resistance in Aarhus. The resistance subsequently became suspicious of her, so she arranged to be arrested and imprisoned in Frøslev Prison Camp to allay this. It did not help and the resistance attempted to kill her on several occasions, succeeding in wounding her. She was sent to Germany to recover. In March 1945 she was hired by the Gestapo in Kolding where she worked until the surrender of German forces in Denmark. On the day of surrender, 5 May, she was in the Gestapo headquarters in Esbjerg where she was wounded when the resistance detonated bombs there. She recovered quickly and went by bicycle to Kolding to get help but the Gestapo had already evacuated. Bartram then went to Brejning where she was arrested on 10 May.

Bartram, by her own account, received DKK 5-700 kr. per month but a witness from the Gestapo claimed she received 3/4 of money paid to informants which amounted to 1200–1500 a month.

== Trial ==
During her trial, it was revealed that Grethe Bartram had informed on as many as 53 people. Of those, her information directly resulted in 15 being tortured during interrogation as well as 35 being transported to Nazi concentration camps in Germany, where eight ultimately died or were reported missing.

Bartram pleaded guilty to the majority of counts she faced and was sentenced to death on 29 October 1946 by the Criminal Court of Aarhus, later affirmed by Vestre Landsret on 22 February 1947 and the Danish Supreme Court on 4 September 1947.

As with Anna Lund Lorenzen, the only other Danish woman sentenced to death after 1945 for war crimes, her sentence was commuted to life in prison by Minister of Justice Niels Busch-Jensen on 9 December 1947. Busch-Jensen gave as his reasons Bartram's young age at the time, that she had been raised in an "anti-religious, communist and materialistic spirit", and that she had had financial troubles.

Bartram was released after ten years in prison on 26 October 1956, after which she moved to Sweden, where she lived under her married name. She became a Swedish citizen during the 1960s and died in 2017 at Vessigebro, aged 92.

== Literature ==
- T. Lauridsen, John (2007). Over stregen - under besættelsen. Samvirke. ISBN 978-87-02-05199-5.
- Bisgaard, Nina (1986). Kvinder i modstandskampen. Tiderne skifter. ISBN 87-7445-284-3.
- Tamm, Ditlev (1984). Retsopgøret efter besættelsen. Jurist- og Økonomforbundets Forlag. ISBN 87-574-4261-4.
- Haaest, Erik (1977). Udyr – eller hvad. Viking. ISBN 87-87503-03-4.
- Skov Kristensen, Henrik (2010). Grethe Bartram – fra kommunist til gestapoagent. Nyt Nordisk Forlag. ISBN 978-87-17-04140-0.
- Hauerbach, Sven (1945). 5. Kolonne. Aarhussabotørernes modige indsats. Archived from the original on 15 April 2016.
- Wolthers, Signe (12 December 2006). Gestopas største stikker. Samvirke.
- Chr. Nielsen, Flemming (1995). Dødsdømt – benådet – straffet. Jyllands-Posten.

== External sources ==
- Grethe Bartram – biography in Dansk Kvindebiografisk Leksikon
- Storstikkeren – Chapter 10 in Erik Haaests book, Udyr – eller hvad from 1977 in an updated e-version from 2006.
- Myter, Mordet i Højbjerg, Marie Lock-Hansen, Forlaget Din Bog
