= Vesterbro, Aarhus =

Vesterbro
- Neighborhood
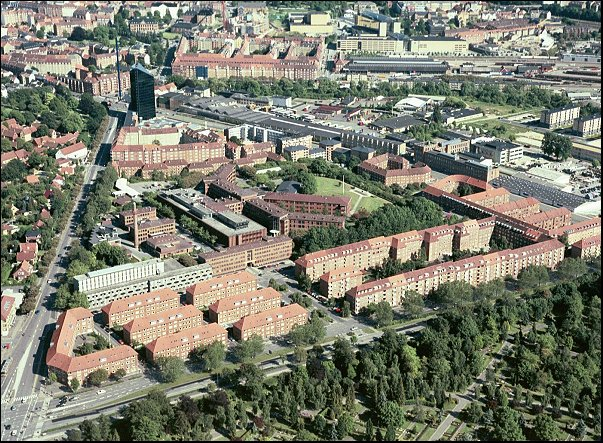
- Vesterbro, western parts

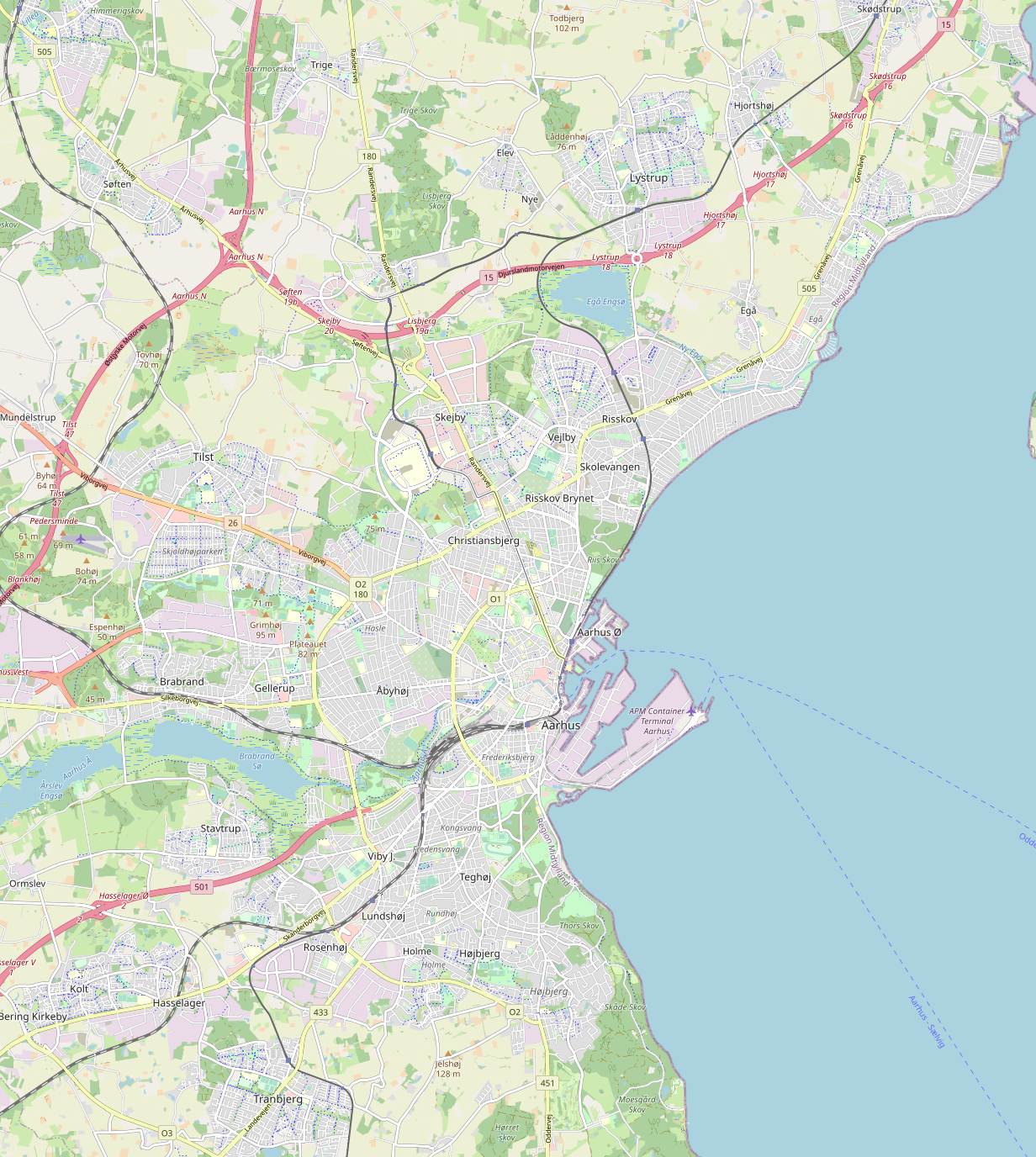
- Location within Aarhus
- Coordinates: 56.161996°N 10.198120°E
- Country: Kingdom of Denmark
- Regions of Denmark: Central Denmark Region
- Municipality: Aarhus Municipality
- District: Aarhus C
- Postal code: 8000

Vesterbro is a neighbourhood of Aarhus, Denmark. It is located in the Aarhus C district, west of the city centre of Indre By. Vesterbro used to be farmland outside the city walls, and the neighbourhood's development progressed, when the city walls of Aarhus were demolished in 1851.

== Description ==
The neighbourhood of Vesterbro is part of Midtbyen and comprise the area between the university, Indre By, the broad railway yard bordering Frederiksbjerg, Aabyhøj and Aarhus V. The oldest part of Vesterbro is located close to Indre By. Places of interest includes the Aarhus Botanical Gardens, the open-air museum of Den Gamle By (one of Denmark's most popular attractions), the hospital of Amtssygehuset and the culture centre of Godsbanen. The main square of Vesterbro Torv used to be a market square for the trading of livestock such as pigs in the 1880s. Now it is probably the busiest junction on Vesterbro.

The inner part of Vesterbro comprise the residential quarters of Ø-gade kvarteret (lit.: the island-street quarter), where most streets are named after Danish islands and CeresByen, a new quarter currently being built on the grounds of the former Ceres Brewery.

== Gallery ==
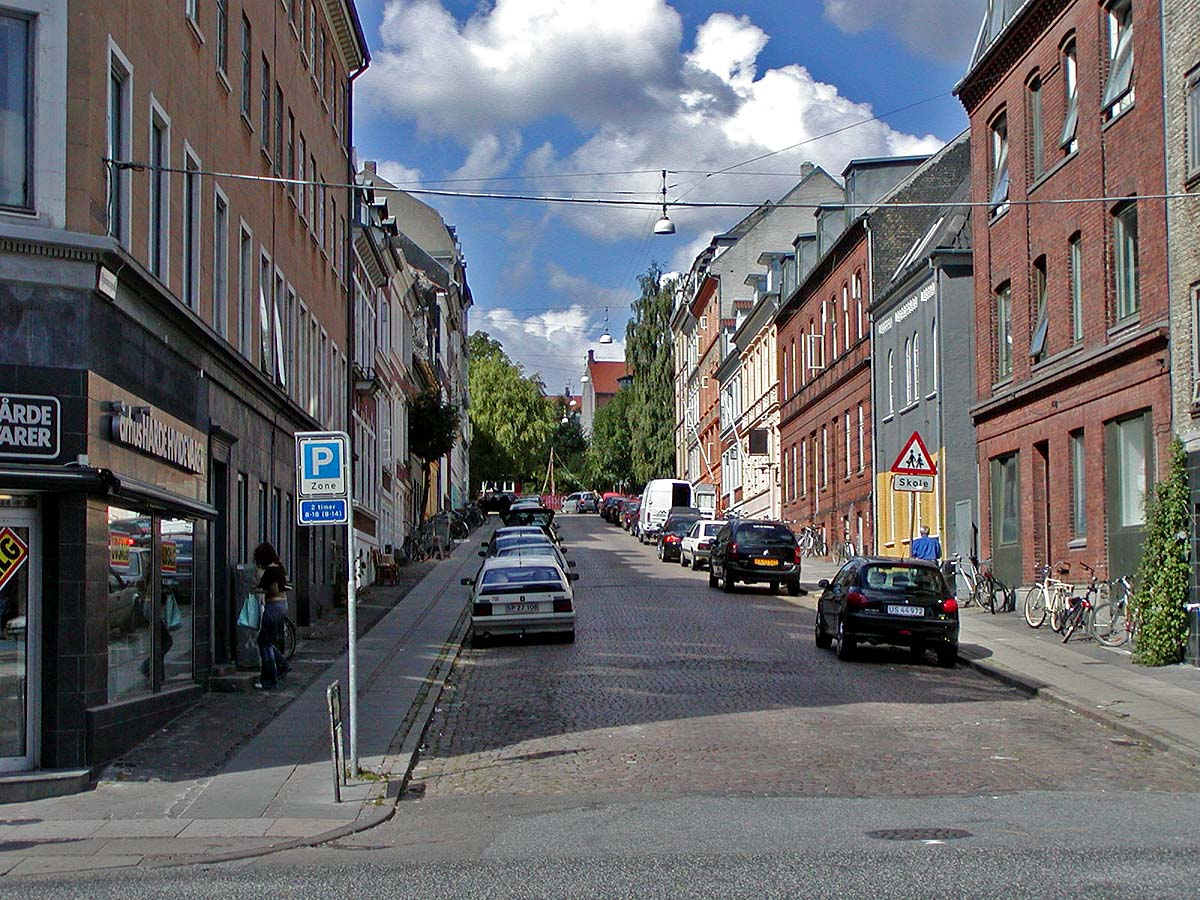
A typical street in Øgadekvarteret, Vesterbro

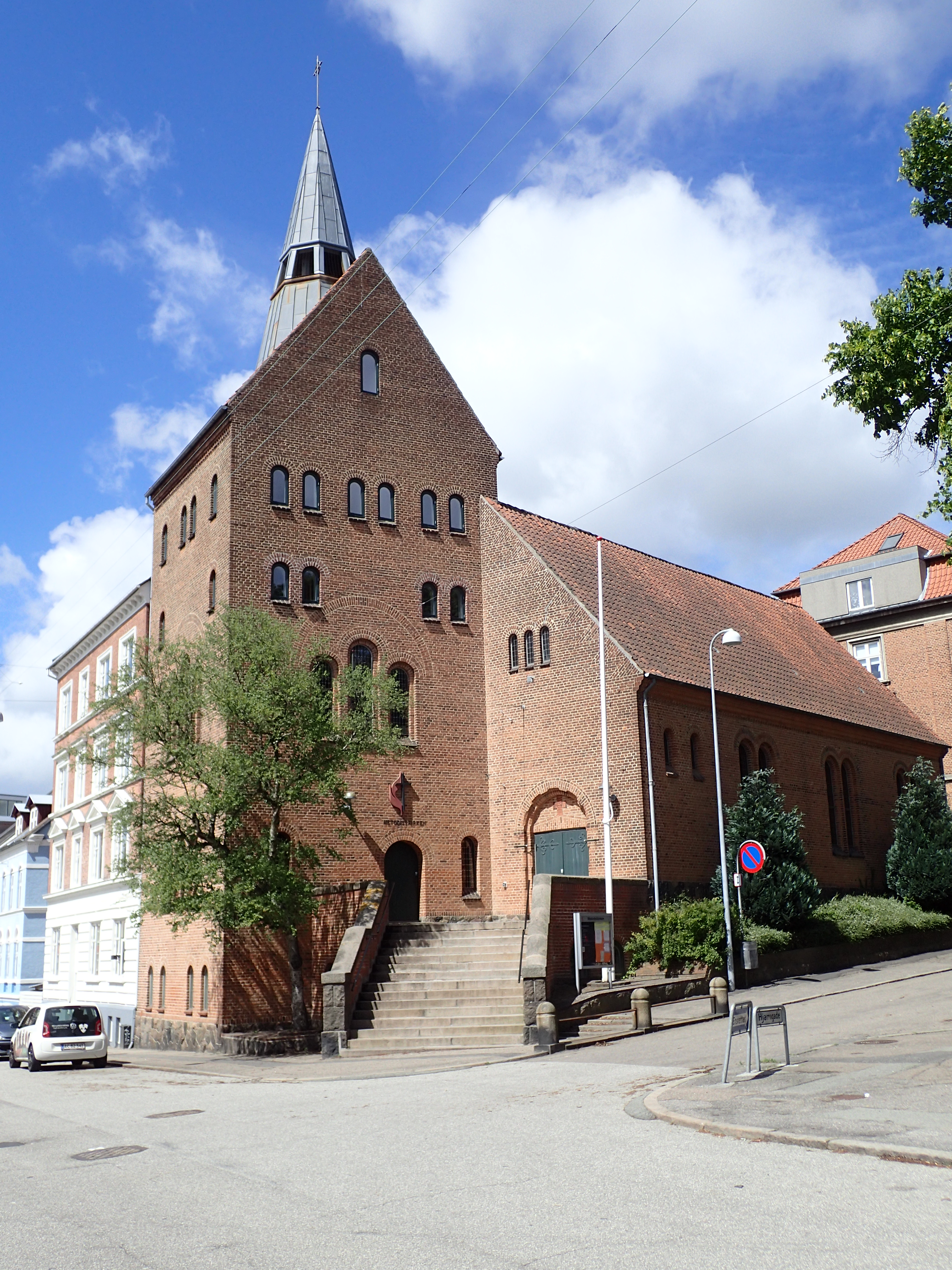
A church in Øgadekvarteret

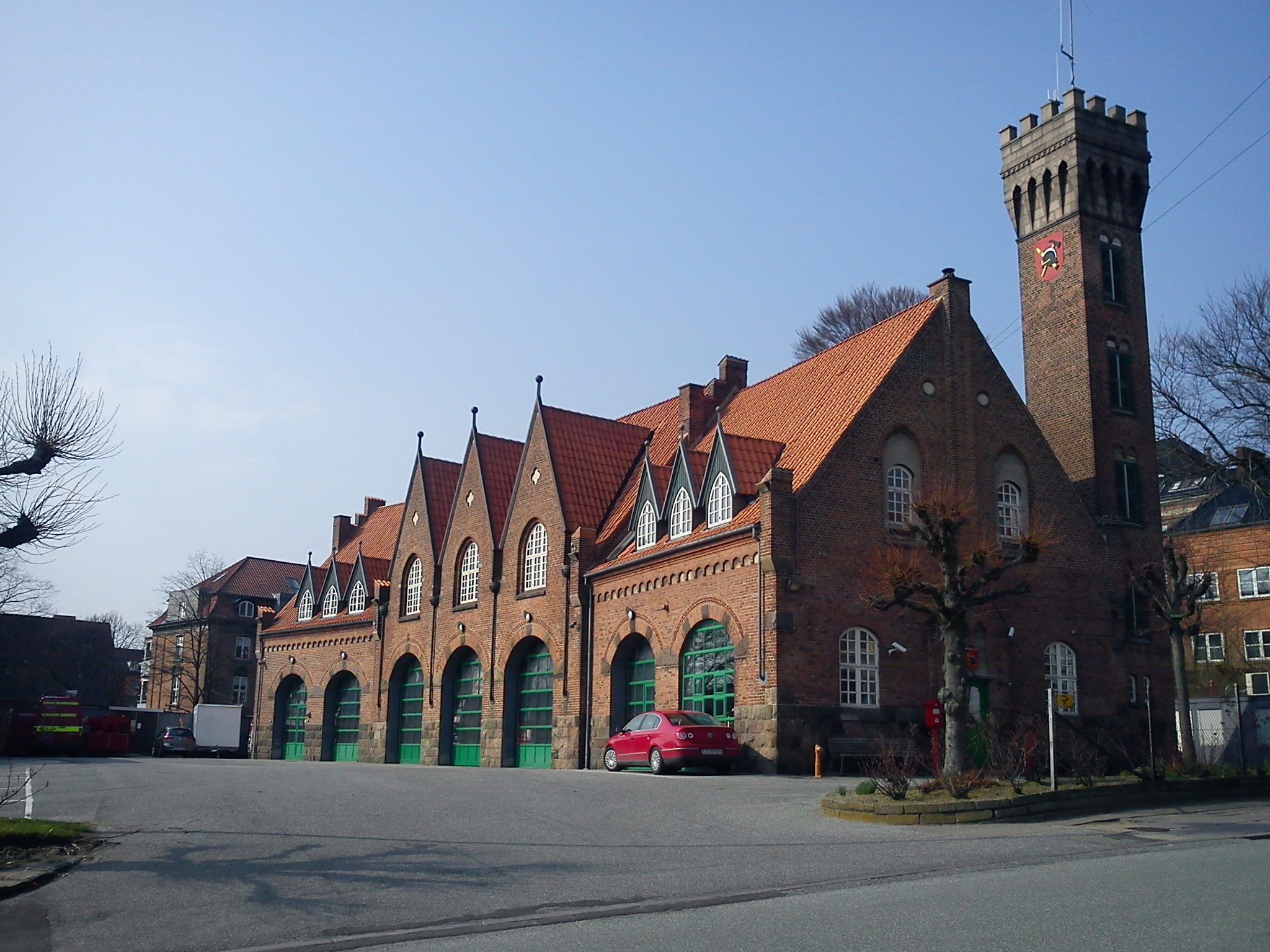
A firestation

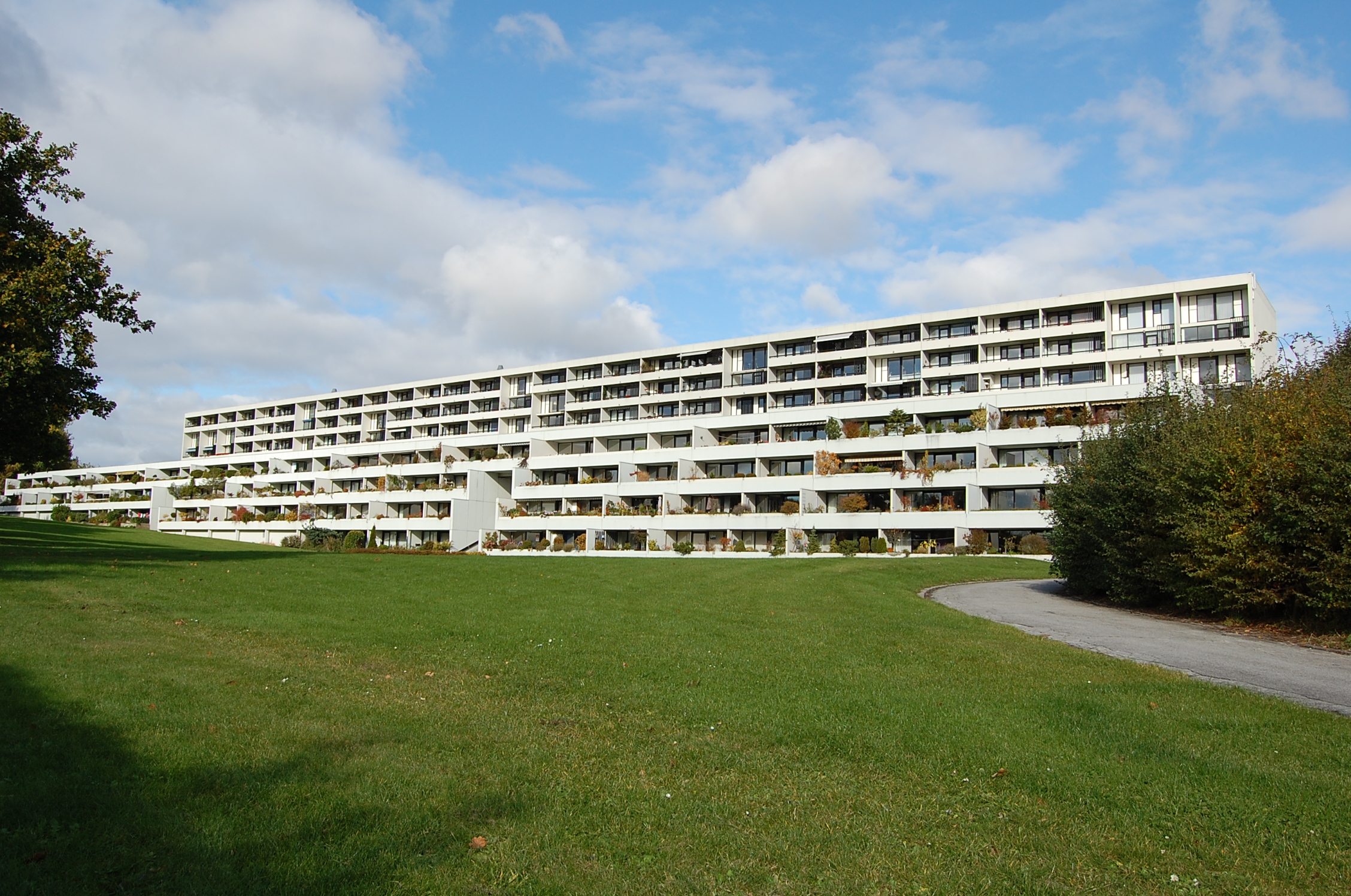
Modern apartment buildings from 1970 in Vesterbro

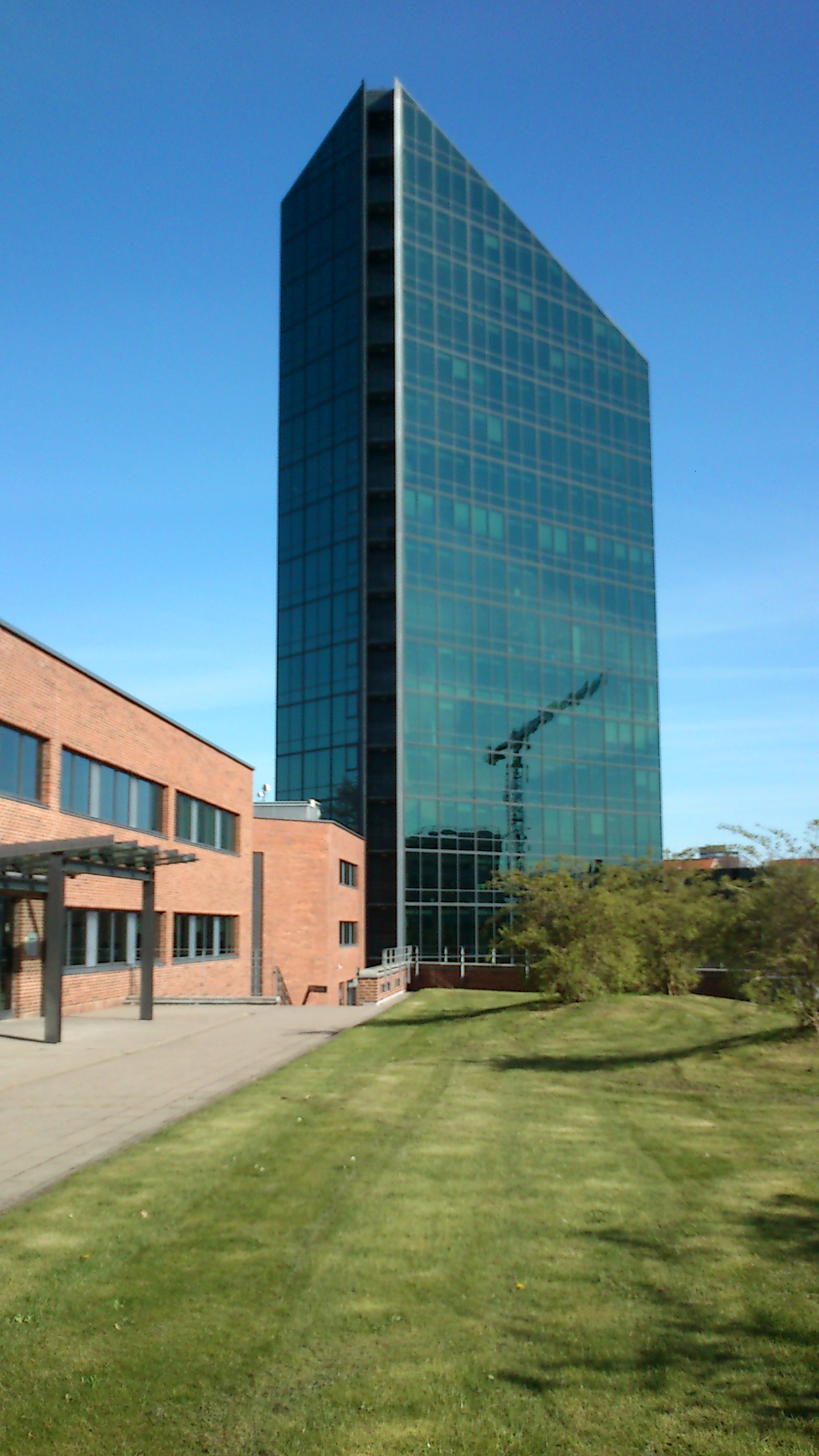
Prismet (lit.: the prism), a visible and central landmark of the Vesterbro skyline

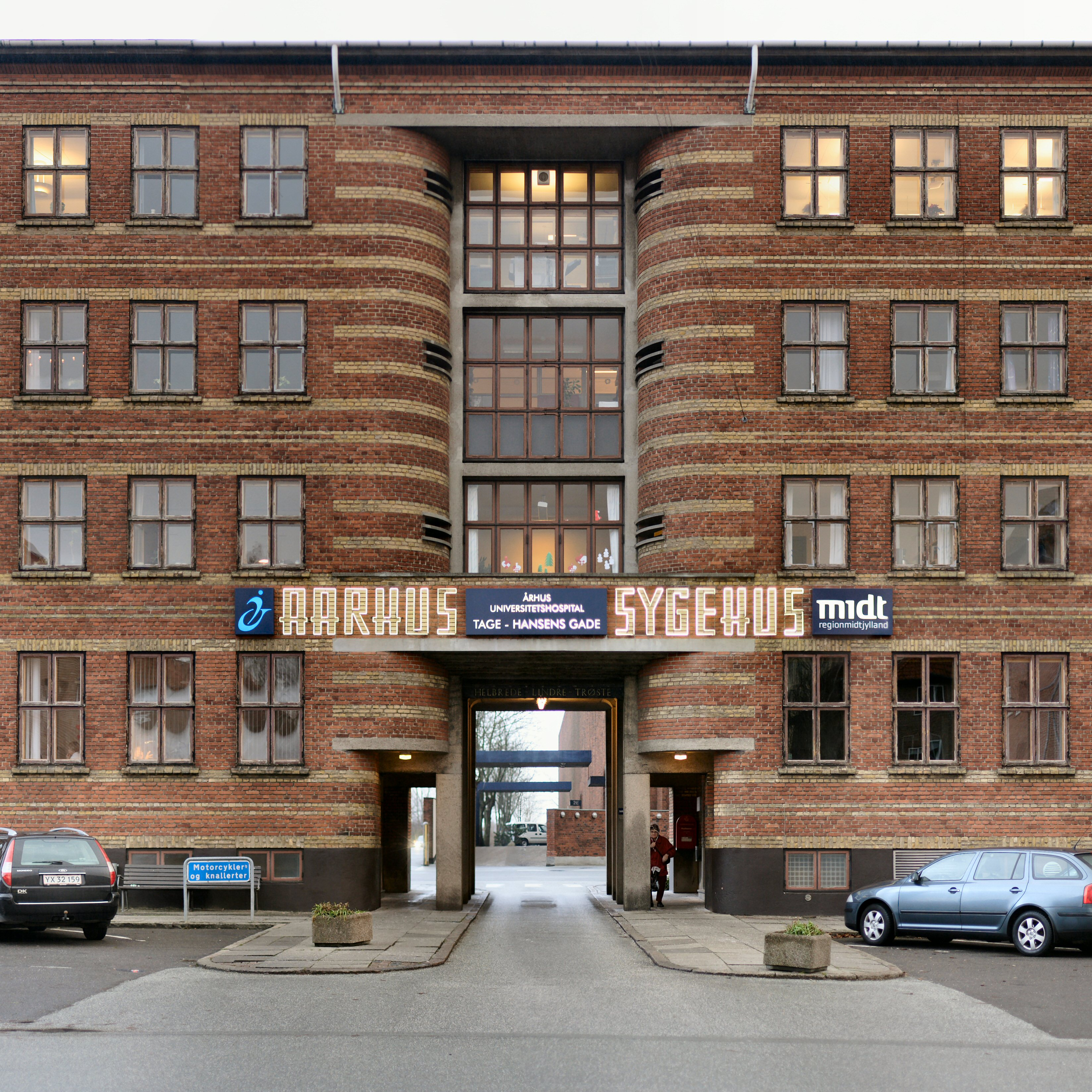
Main entrance to the hospital of Amtssygehuset

== Sources ==
- Vesterbro: Danish
