= Ballehage Beach =

Urban, public beach in Aarhus, Denmark

- Beach
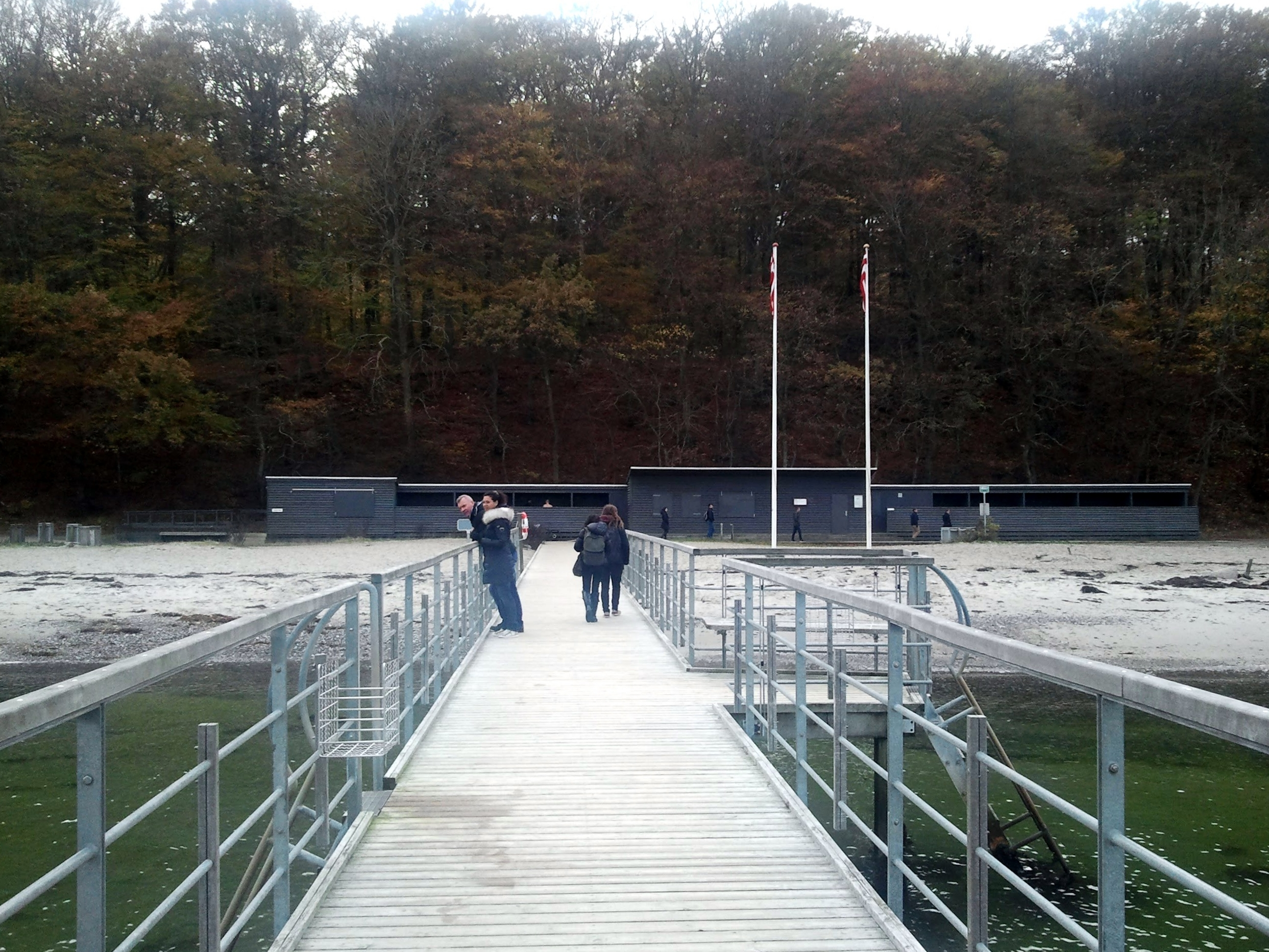
- Ballehage Beach
- Interactive map of Ballehage Beach
- Coordinates: 56.121°N 10.225°E
- Location: Højbjerg, Aarhus, Denmark

Dimensions
  - Length: 1000 meters
- Access: Ørneredevej, Buses 17, 123

Ballehage Beach is an urban, public beach in the southern parts of Aarhus, Denmark and since 1929 it has been one of the oldest sea baths in Denmark. Ballehage Beach is situated in the Marselisborg Forests on the Bay of Aarhus in the suburb of Højbjerg, south of Marselisborg Yacht Harbour and the Aarhus River mouth. Helgenæs lies across the bay to the east, a bit inland to the west is the Marselisborg Deer Park and to the north is the Varna Palace. The beach area is some 1,000 metres (1,000 yards) long and between 10 and 30 metres (30 and 100 feet) wide. It is a white sandy beach with occasional rows of boulders extending into the sea, for coastal erosion protection. Ballehage Beach is popular for sunbathing and swimming due to the shielding effect and scenic view of the nearby forest on the steep hillsides to the west. The beach has a single jetty extending some 20 metres (66 feet) into the sea, offering a platform to jump from or relax on. There are outdoor changing facilities, toilets and storage areas. The Beach is open year-round for everyone at no charge.

Ballehage Beach does not have a life guard in the summer but there is a safety station with a lifesaver. It's situated in an area with heavy foot traffic, busy roads and a restaurants. Aarhus Municipality frequently tests the water for bacteria and algae and rates all beaches on a yearly basis. In 2014 and 2015 the beach has received the highest possible 3/3 rating. The water level drops off relatively rapidly and reaches a depth of 2 metres (6 feet 7 inches) some 20 metres (22 yards) from the shore. The winter bathing club Vikingebadeklubben Ballehage is based out of the facilities on BAllehage Beach.

== Access ==
The park lies along Ørneredevej in the Marselisborg Forests which can be reached by buses which run from central Aarhus and the Aarhus Central Station. Bus no. 31 depart from the central bus station and stops at "Ørneredevej v. Ballehage" by Ballehage Beach. The Deer Park lies nearby and there is parking there. Danish National Cycle Route 5 runs along the coast of eastern Jutland from Odder Municipality to central Aarhus, passing through the Marselisborg Forests and by Ballehage Beach, before it continues north to Den Permanente, Bellevue Beach and Åkrogen. It's possible to walk the 4 km. along the coast from Indre by and Marselisborg Yacht Harbour lies 2 km. north of the beach, providing access by sea for smaller boats and ships that can dock at the jetty.
