= Den Permanente =

Beach in Aarhus, Denmark

Coordinates: 56°10′36″N 10°13′54″E

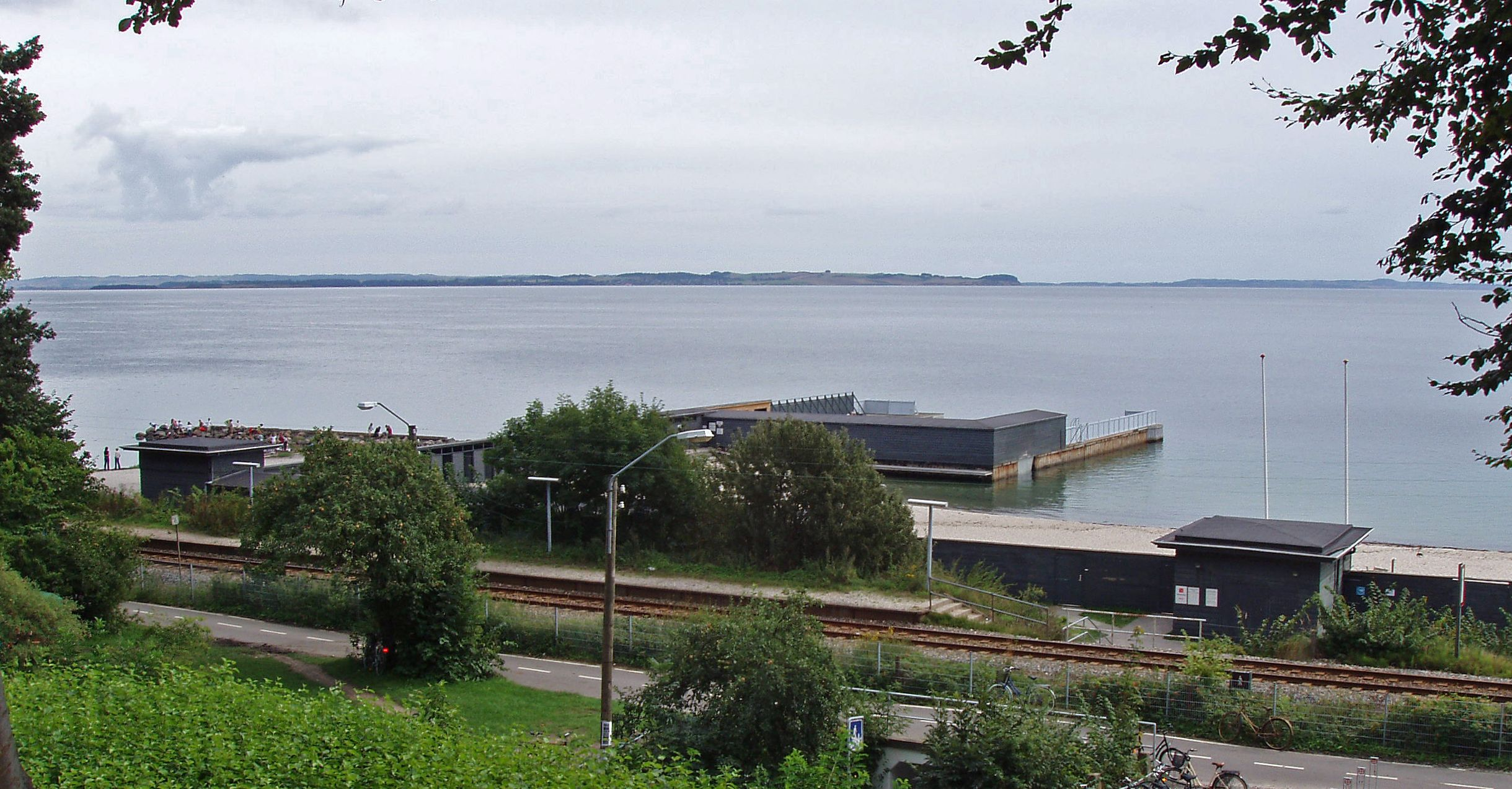
Den Permanente, separated from the forest of Riis Skov by the railway line of Aarhus Nærbane.

Den Permanente (lit. 'The Permanent') is a sea bath and a beach in Aarhus, Denmark.

Den Permanente is situated below the woodland park Riis Skov north of the city centre and along the railway line of Aarhus Nærbane. Den Permanente is one of two municipal beaches in Aarhus with public bathing structures, the other being Ballehage Beach in the Marselisborg Forests south of the city centre. The historic restaurant Sjette Frederiks Kro is situated in the forest above the sea bath.

The sea bath consists of wooden buildings and jetties and provides changing facilities, showers, toilets, shelters, a life guard station and a nearby kiosk. The enclosed sandy beach is small. North and south of the structure there are two adjacent sandy spots and long stretches of rocky sea walls. The sea bath is only open to the general public in the daytime hours from late June to mid August, while the two adjacent beaches are publicly accessible year round. The sea bath was inaugurated in 1933, projected by Aarhus City Council and financed primarily by Aarhus Harbour. Prior to the permanent buildings, seasonal buildings had been erected in the summertime, hence the name "the permanent".

== Sports associations ==
The sea bath is currently used by three sport associations:

- Aarhus Beachvolley Club 1900, beach volley
- Aarhus Kajakpoloclub, kayak polo
- Vikingeklubben Jomsborg, winter bathing

== Gallery ==
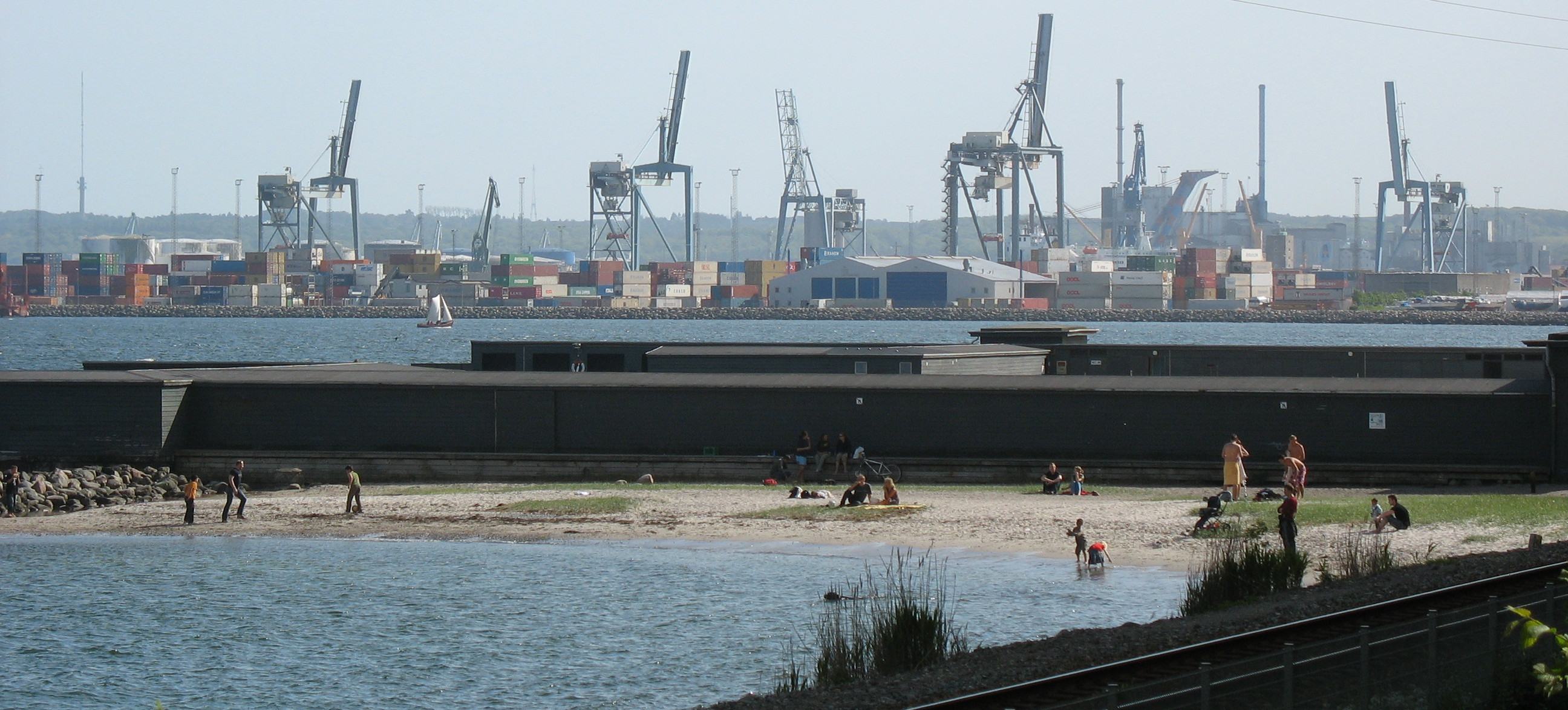
The seabath structure and surrounding sandy beach with a view to Aarhus Harbour on the horizon.

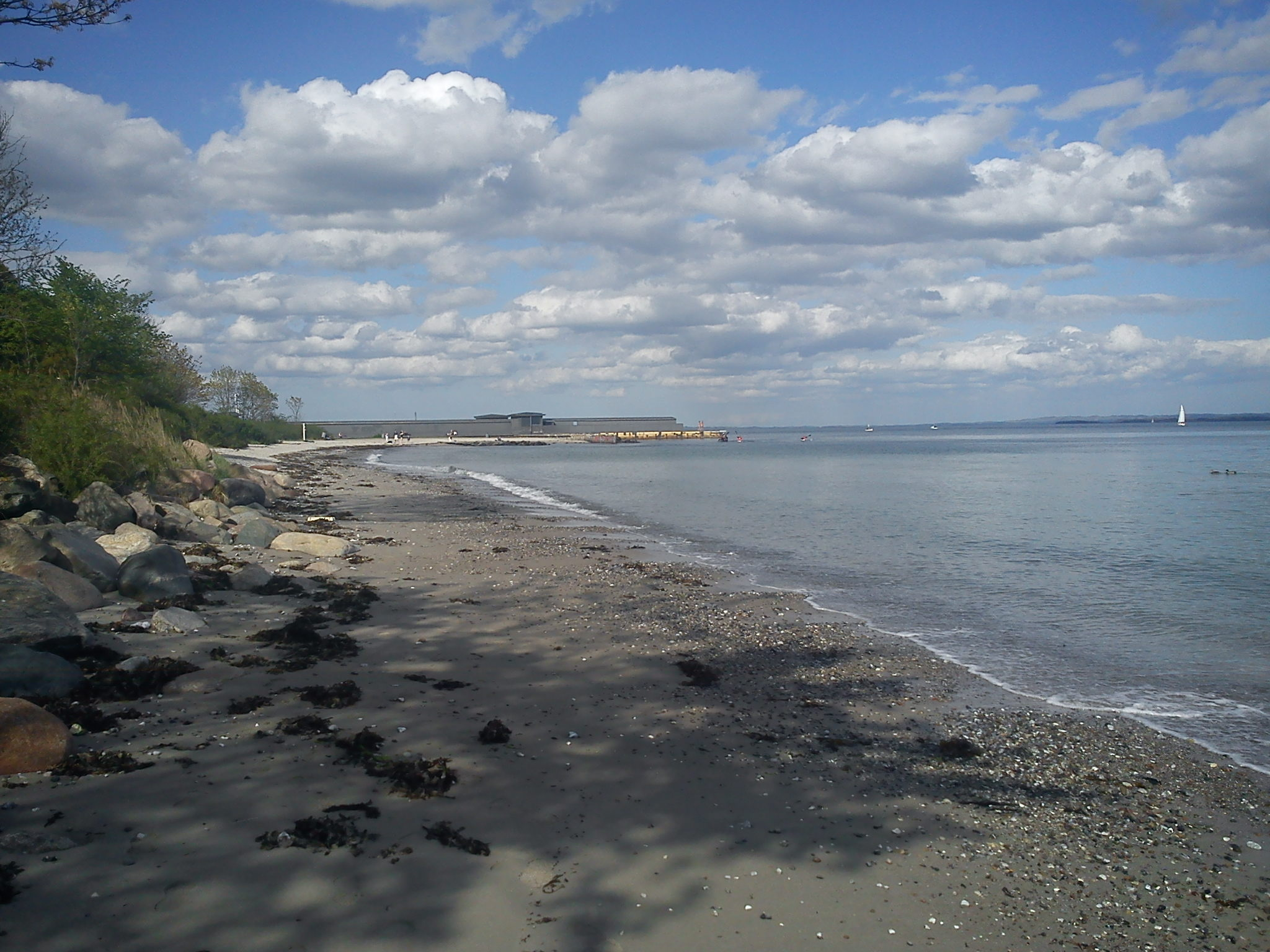
The public southern sandy beach with a view to the seabath structure.

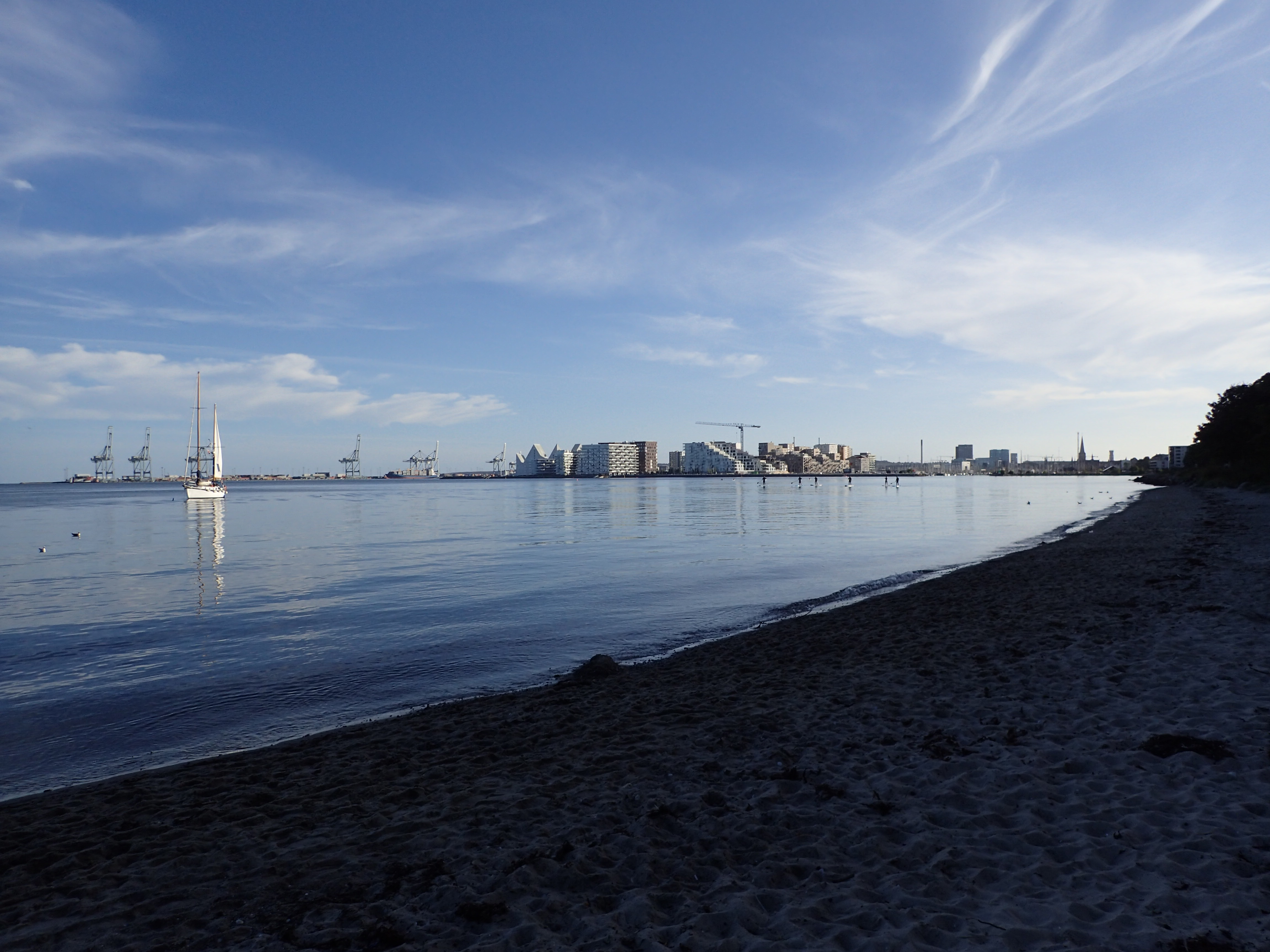
The public southern sandy beach with a view to Aarhus Harbour.
