= Aarhus Forestry Botanical Garden =

Botanical garden in Aarhus, Denmark

Coordinates: 56°7′32″N 10°12′04″E

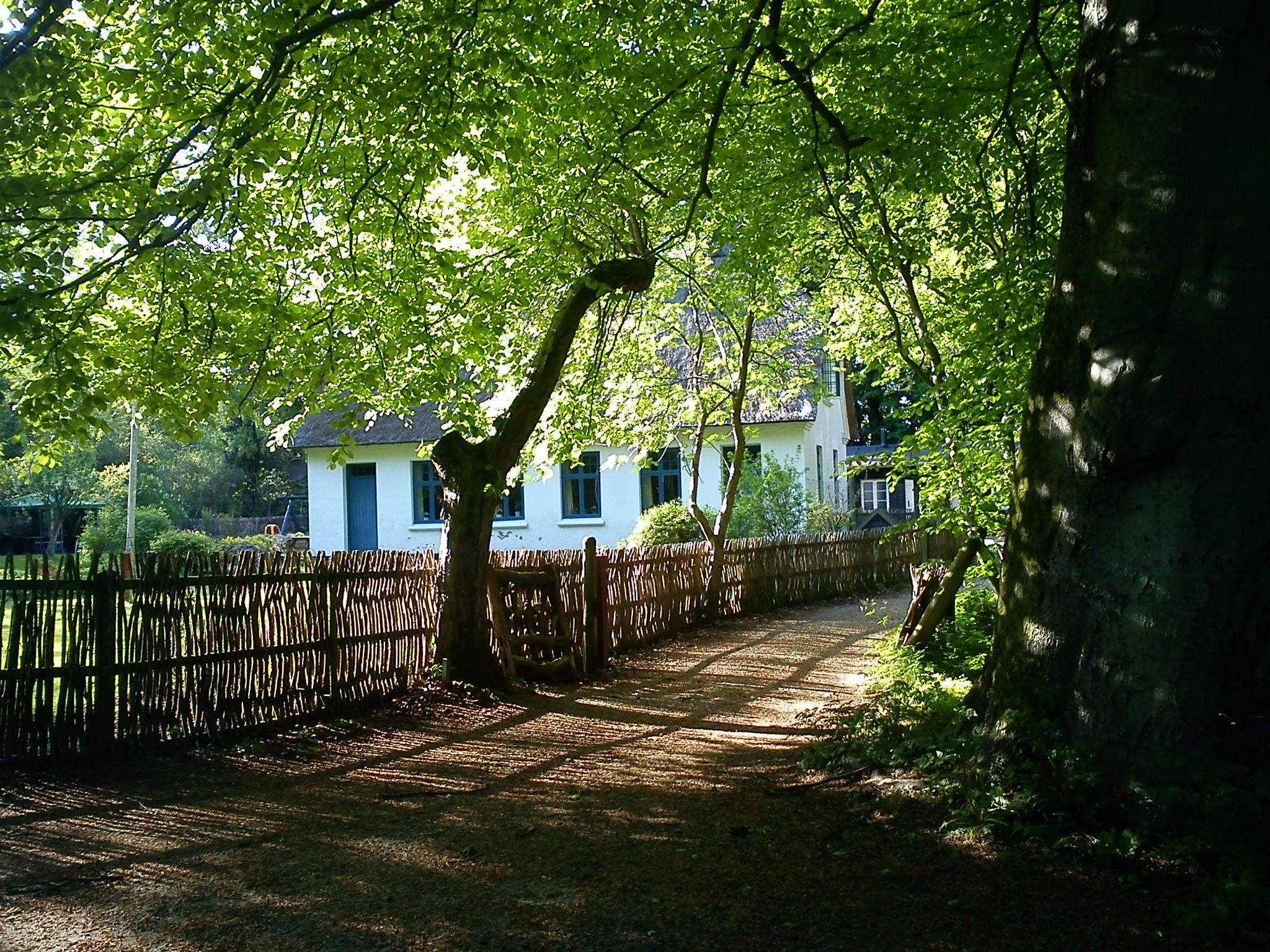
Aarhus Forestry Botanical garden. The Foresters Lodge

Aarhus Forestry Botanical Garden (Danish: Forstbotanisk Have) is a forestry botanical garden located in the south of Aarhus, Denmark. It forms a small part of the northern section of Marselisborg Forests, and is situated right next to Marselisborg Palace and Mindeparken. The cathedral is a 10-minute walk away. The botanical garden was established in 1923.

The garden holds 900 different species of trees and bushes from all over the world, on just about 5 hectares (12 acres). Because of the nearby forest and the varied flora, the botanical garden also attracts a varied fauna and it is not unusual to spot roe deer, squirrels, owls and herons, amongst other animals here.

== Gallery ==
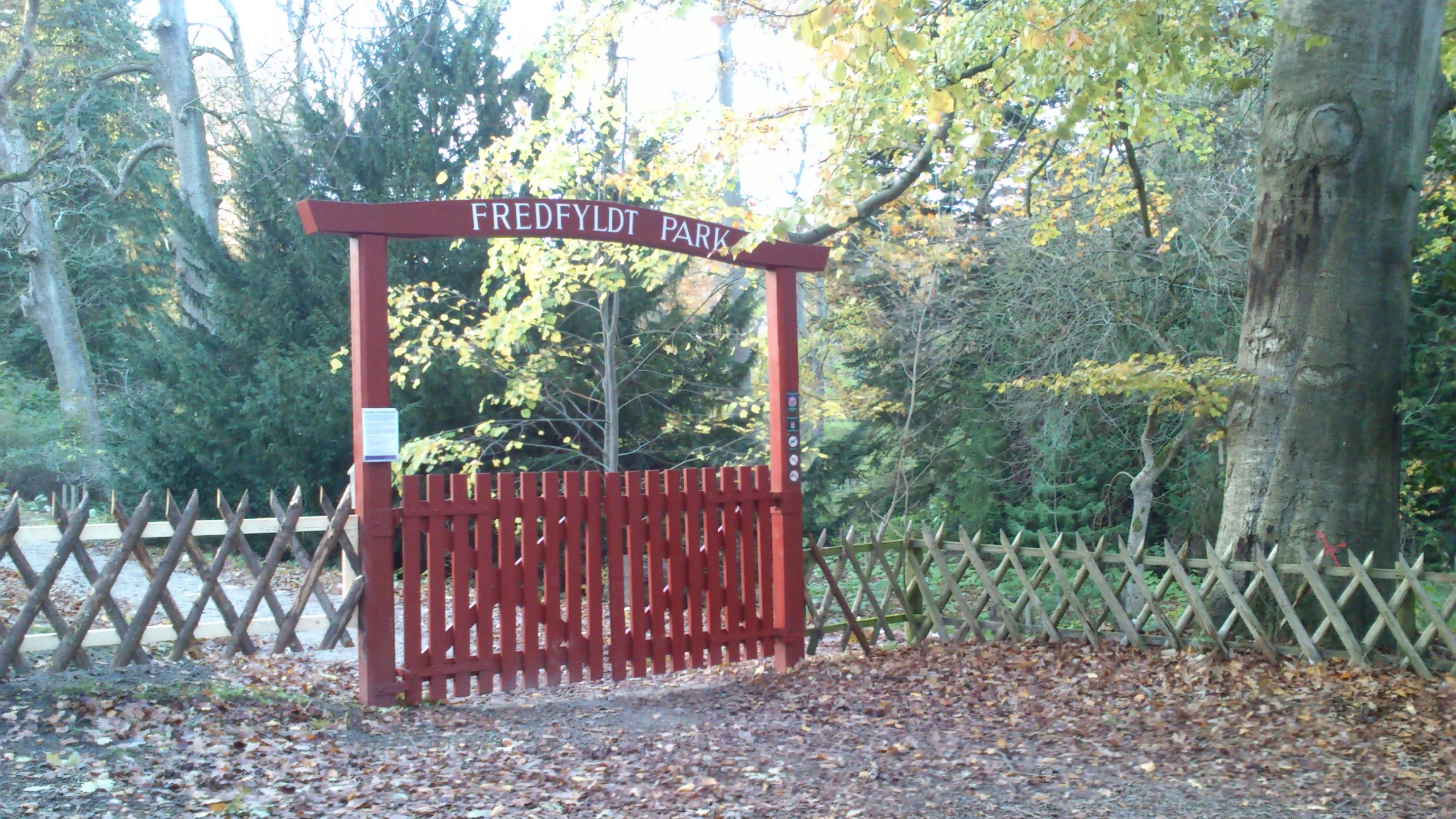

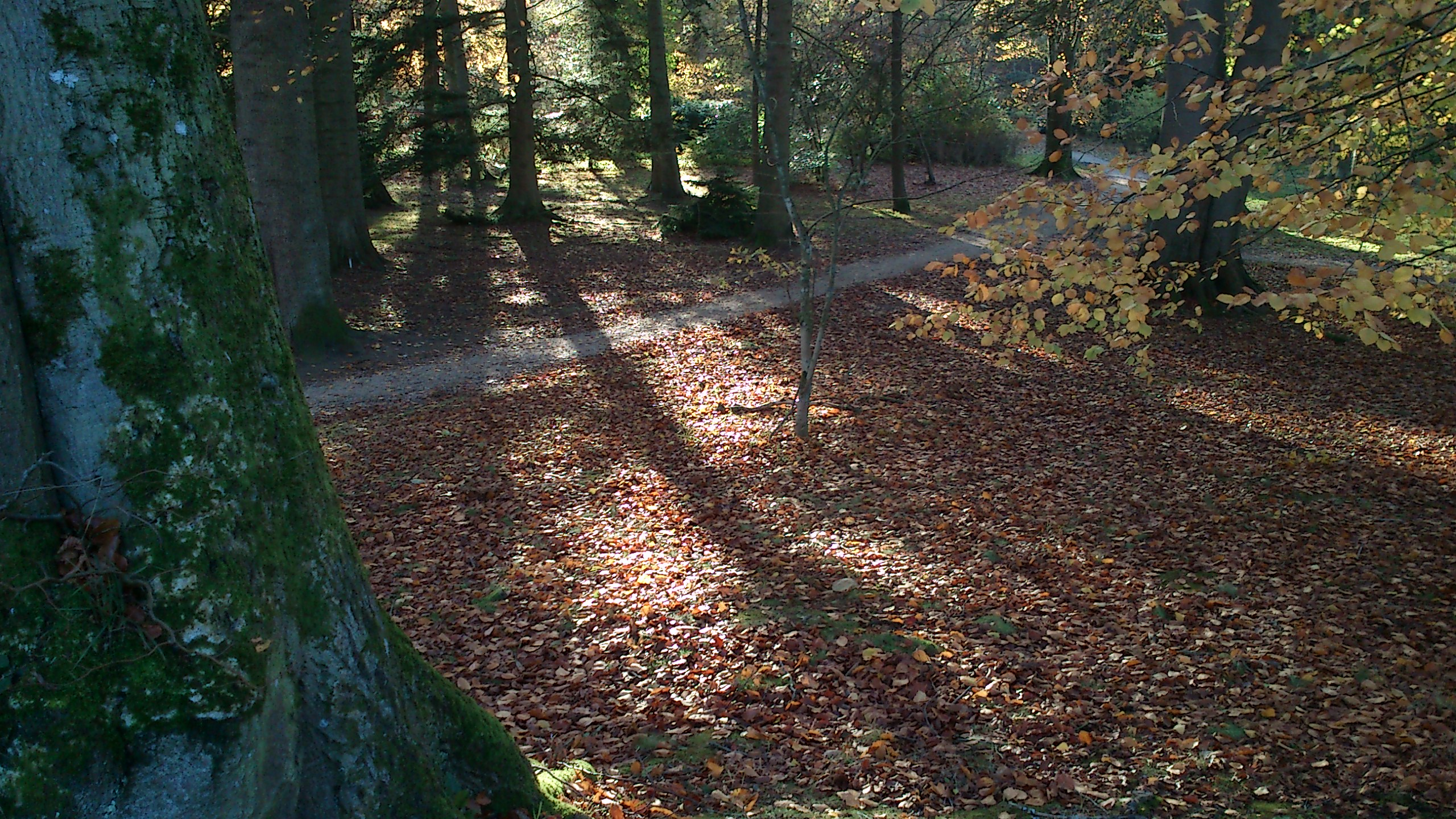

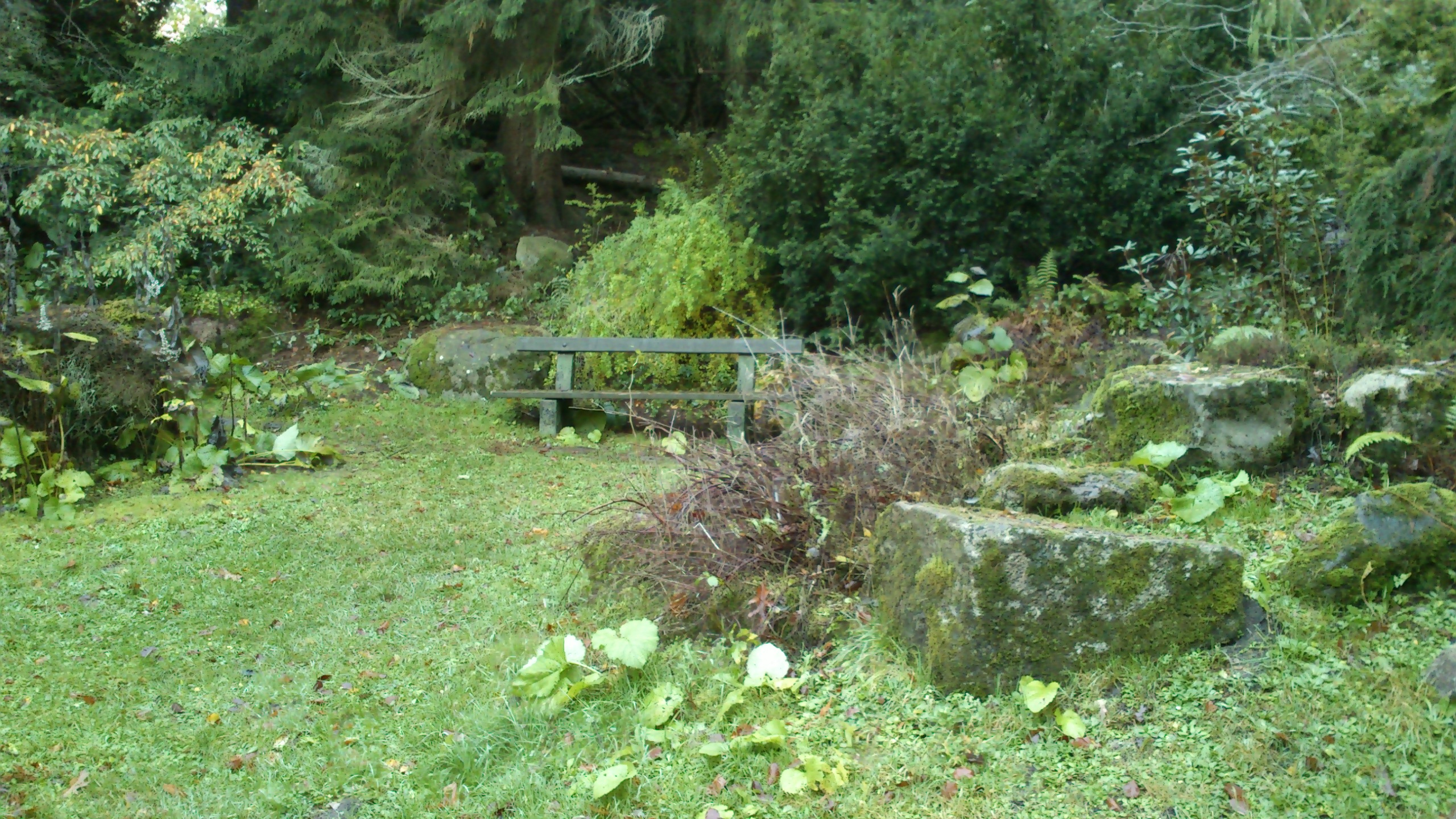

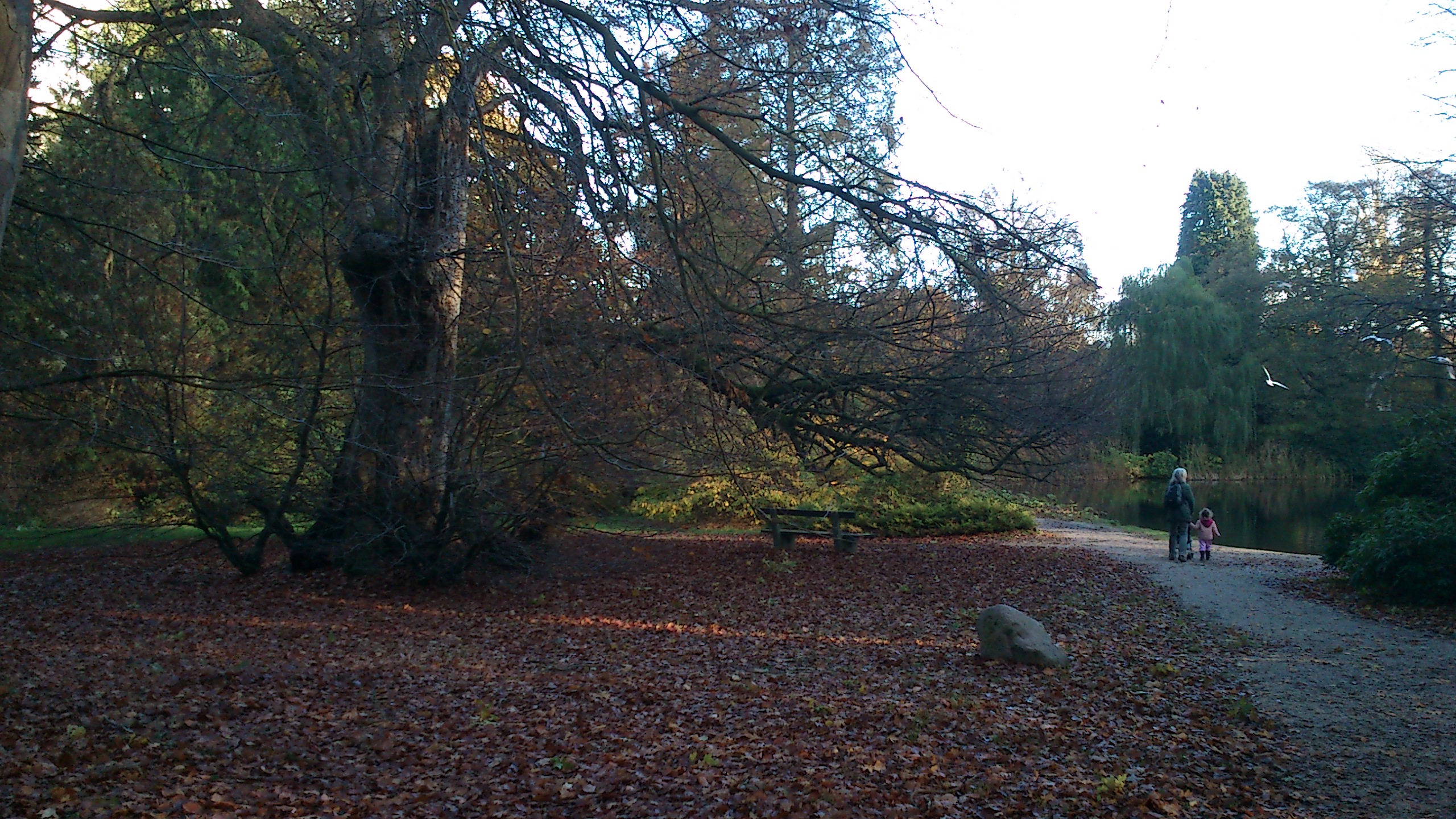

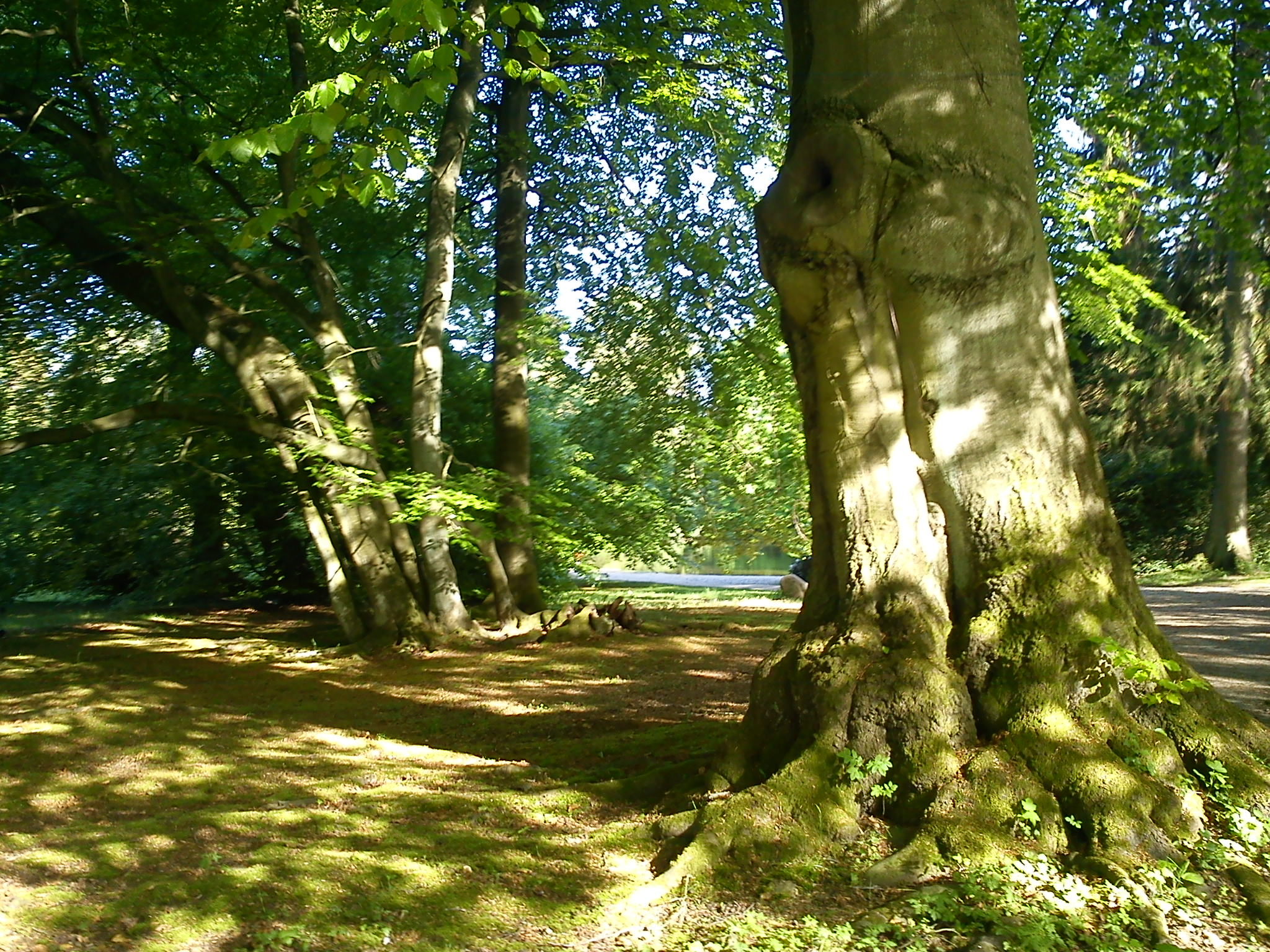

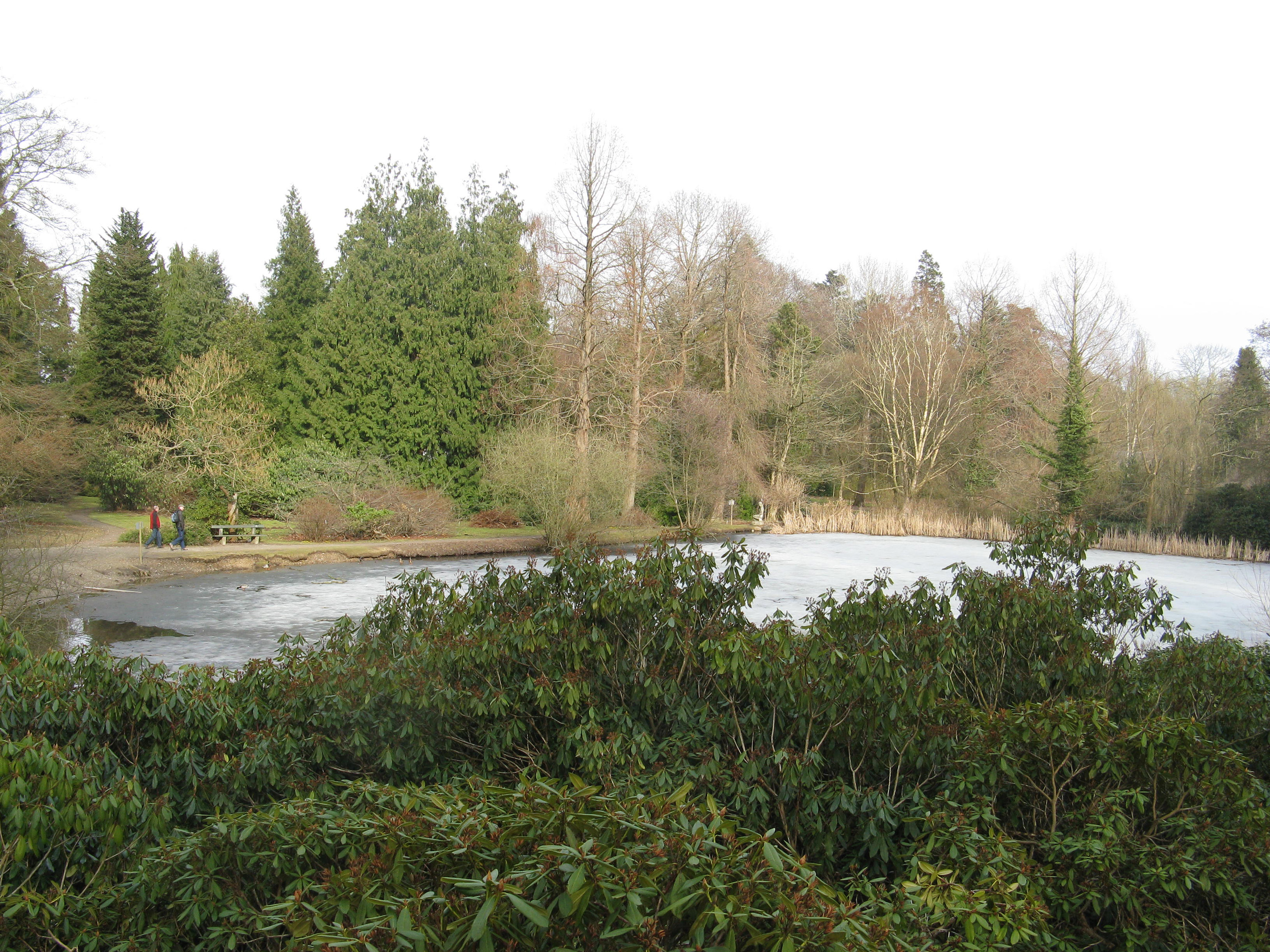

== Sources ==
- Excursions in The Forestry Botanical Garden Aarhus Municipality (2006) (in Danish)
