= Marselisborg Forests =

Forest to the south of Aarhus City in Denmark

Coordinates: 56°06′N 10°14′E

Marselisborg Forests Marselisborgskovene
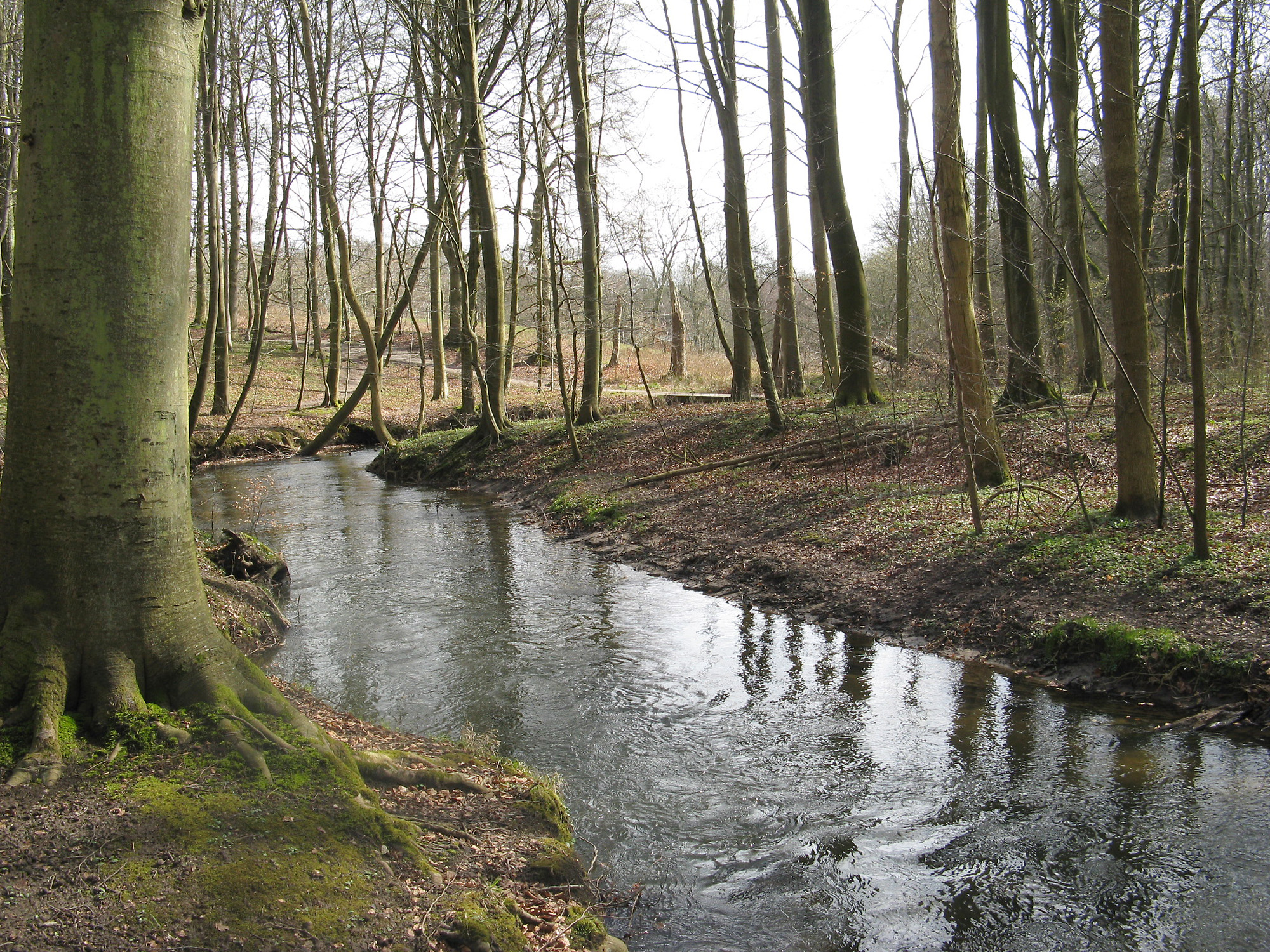
- Marselisborg Forests. Early spring at the Giber stream.
- Interactive map of Marselisborg Forests

Geography
- Location: Aarhus, Central Denmark Region, Denmark
- Area: 15 km^{2} (5.8 sq mi)

Administration
- Authority: Aarhus Municipality

Ecology
- Ecosystems: Mixed deciduous forest, natural beech wood, temperate coniferous forest, plus seventeen special habitats
- WWF Classification: Baltic mixed forests

Marselisborg Forests (Danish: Marselisborgskovene), or simply Marselisborg Forest, is a 550 hectares (1,400 acres) forest to the south of Aarhus City in the Kingdom of Denmark. Many present day sources now includes the forest of Fløjstrup, as part of the Marselisborg Forests, upping the total area with another 200 hectares (490 acres). Marselisborg Forests runs along the coastline of the Aarhus Bay in a hilly terrain with steep slopes and deep gullies, especially at the shoreline. There are many traces of prehistoric activities here and the landscape has been covered by woodland for thousands of years.

== History ==
The Marselisborg Forests of today is comprised by a collection of small patches of woodland, that have been allowed to merge into a single entity, mainly after 1820. The woodland patches originally belonged to the barony of Marselis, residing at the now gone Marselisborg (meaning "Marselis-castle"), where Marselisborg Gymnasium is located today. Before 1820, there was an extensive forestry in the woods, so most of the trees here are no more than 200 years old. Aarhus Municipality took ownership of the land and forests in 1896, when they acquired the Marselis estate.

=== Cultural importance ===
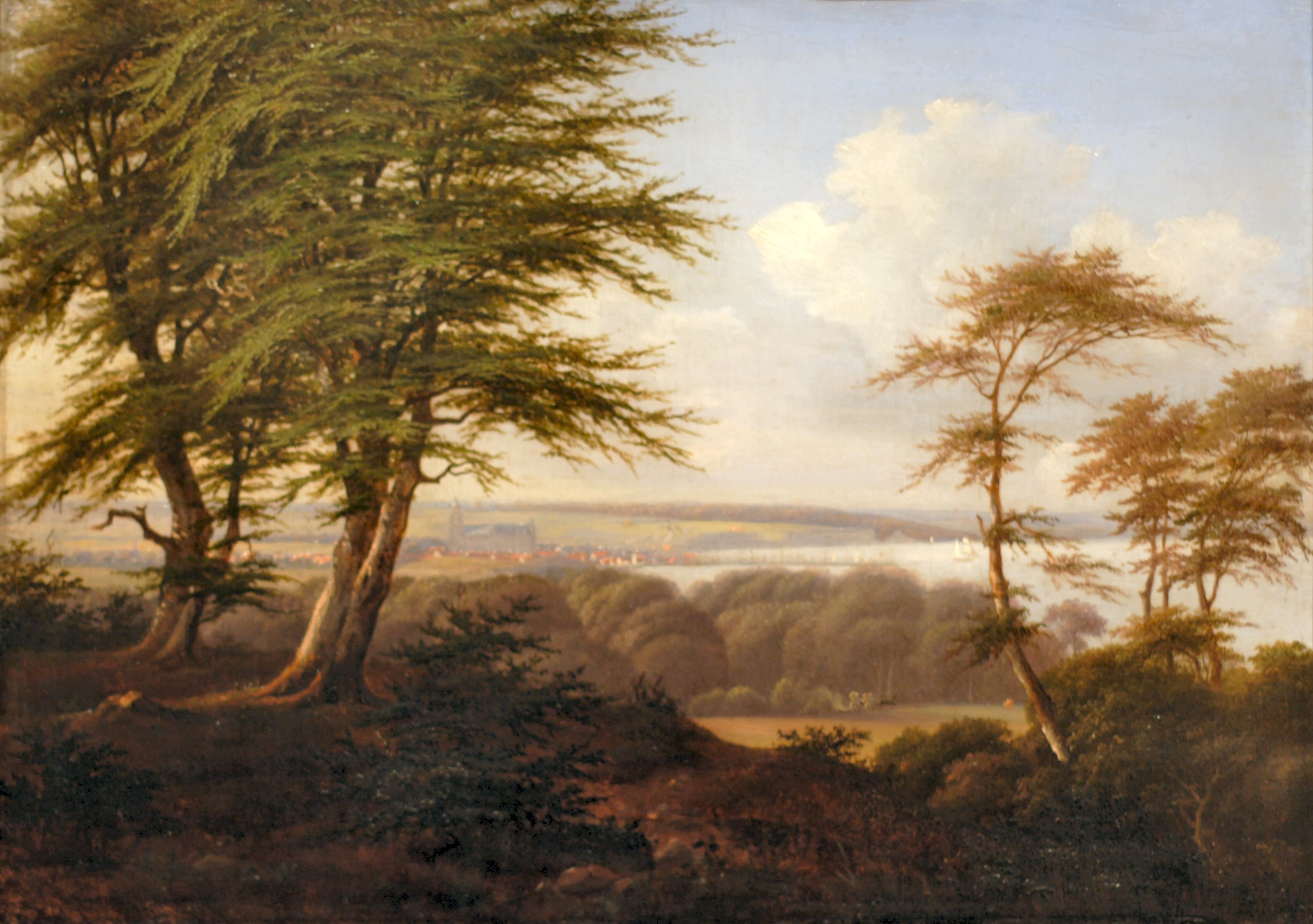
Aarhus seen from Moesgård. Painting from the 1800s by Peter Holm.

Marselisborg Forests have a long cultural history as a recreational area for Aarhus and its citizens and today it is among the most frequented forests in Denmark. The forests are used heavily for a variety of purposes, such as kindergarten excursions, camping, mountainbiking, scouting activities and headquarters, horse trails, running events, celebrations, picnics and more everyday unorganized activities like strolling, mushroom hunting, surf fishing, etc.. The forestry business is rather limited today. Marselisborg Forests are home to several important facilities for the citizens of the Aarhus area, such as:

- An amusement park (Tivoli Friheden)
- A stadium and sports arena (Atletion)
- A forestry botanical garden
- Marselisborg Deer Park.
- The Varna Palace from 1909. Now 'Odd Fellow Palace Varna' since 1970.
- A hotel. The Helnan Marselis Hotel.
- Blommehaven Camping site.
- Marselisborg Kayak Club (MKC) and headquarters.
- Frederikshøj Kro. Originally the home of the forest keeper, but also known as a restaurant from around 1800. For many years it offered orchestral concerts in addition to the food and drinks. Now exclusively a highend restaurant, with attached conference halls.
- 3 old watermills:
  - Silistria. First mentioned in written sources in 1661 and with a long history as a grain mill, brewery, restaurant, etc., Silistria is now the headquarters of OK Pan Århus, Denmark's oldest orienteering club founded in 1946.
  - Thors Mølle (Thors Mill) from 1637, as the only remaining stamp mill of the original five at the Varna stream. Initially a powder mill and with a history as a guesthouse and restaurant, tracing back to the 1700s. The modern day restaurant at Thors Mølle, were founded around the year 1900.
  - Skovmøllen (The Mill in the Forest) can be traced back to at least the year 1570, but extensively altered and rebuilt in 1852. Skovmøllen is Denmark's only functioning undershot millstone (with an overshot water wheel) and it powers both a grain mill and a sawmill. Skovmøllen have worked as a restaurant and housed celebrations since the 1800s. The milling business was restarted in the year 2000, by a team of volunteers and guided tours are arranged regularly.
- Moesgård Museum with surrounding open-air museums, including the old Moesgård Manor.
- Ballehage Beach, the oldest of two public municipal beaches in Aarhus with bathing facilities.

The many sources to the cultural history and recreational use of the Marselisborg Forests through the ages, suggests that the forests were used even more extensively in previous times, than today. In the early 1900s, it even housed a zoo, and two steamboats regularly transported citizens from the Aarhus harbour to various spots, just for recreational purposes. Many of the historic documents of the booming restaurants and scenes, reports dramatic drops in turnovers, when television was introduced in the 1950-60's.

As one of the more popular and noteworthy happenings of our time, the northern parts of Marselisborg Forests housed a Sculpture by the Sea event once every second year in June from 2009 to 2015. The tradition was initiated by crown princess Mary and crown prince Frederik of Denmark, inspired by Australia; Mary's country of birth. The event called 'Sculpture by the Sea, Aarhus - Denmark' was financially and legally independent of 'Sculpture by the Sea Incorporated' and it was produced by the city of Aarhus in collaboration with ARoS Aarhus Artmuseum under the patronage of the crown prince couple. The exhibitions attracted an estimated half a million visitors each.

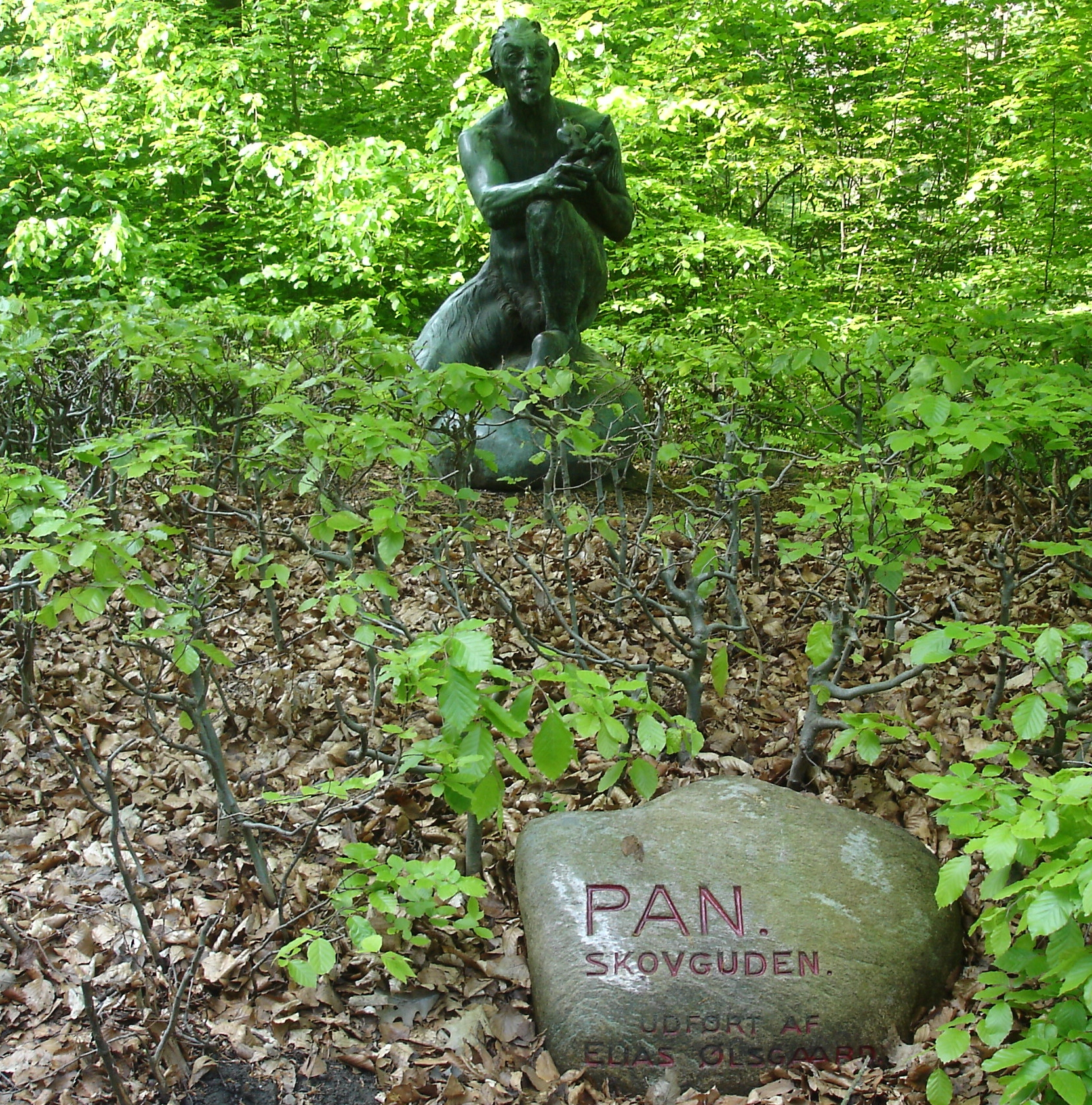
A sculpture of Pan in the woods near the northern entrances.

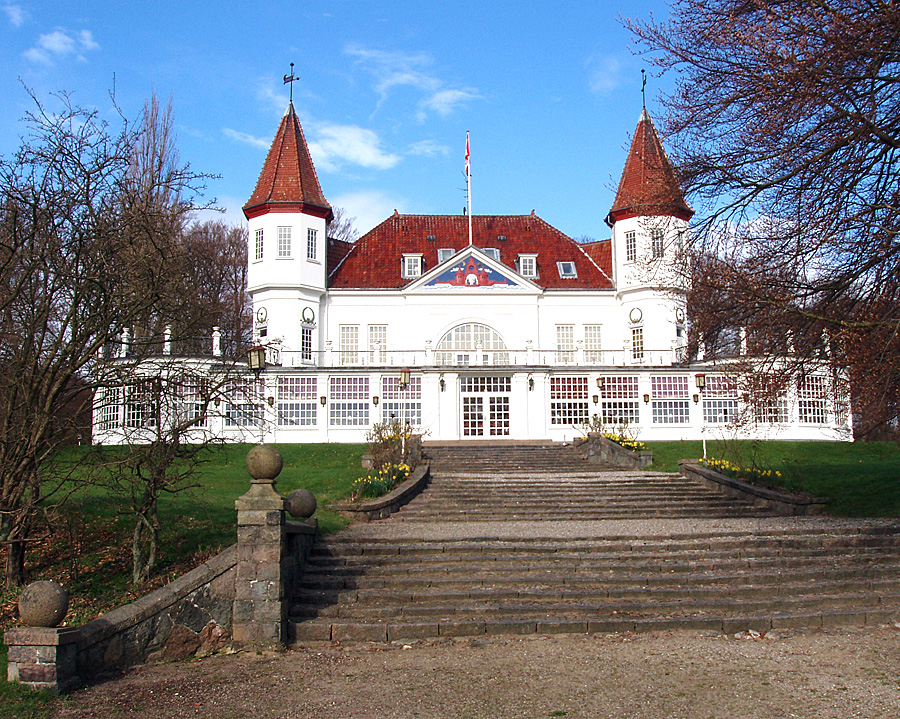
The Varna Palace

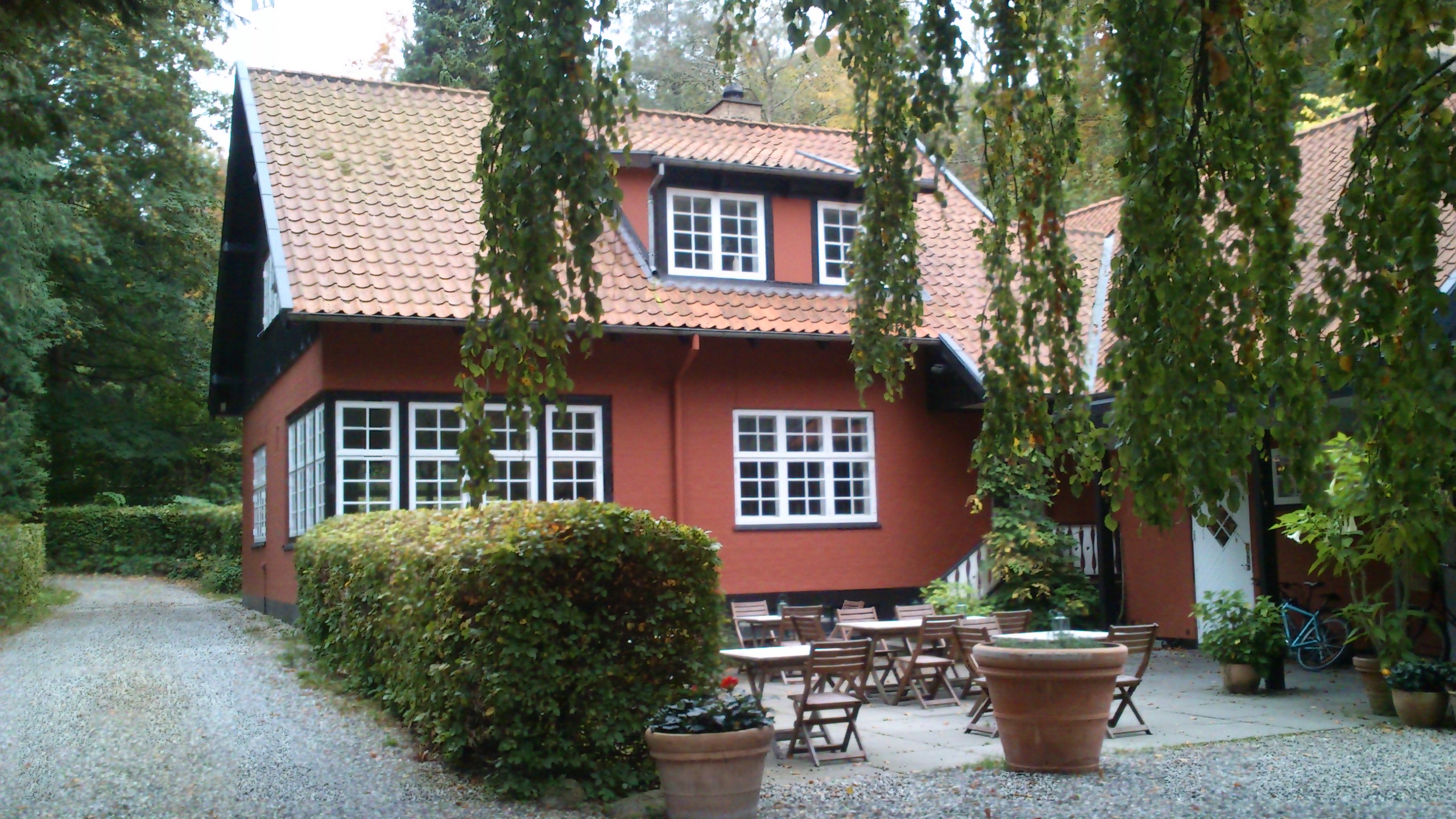
Thors Mill

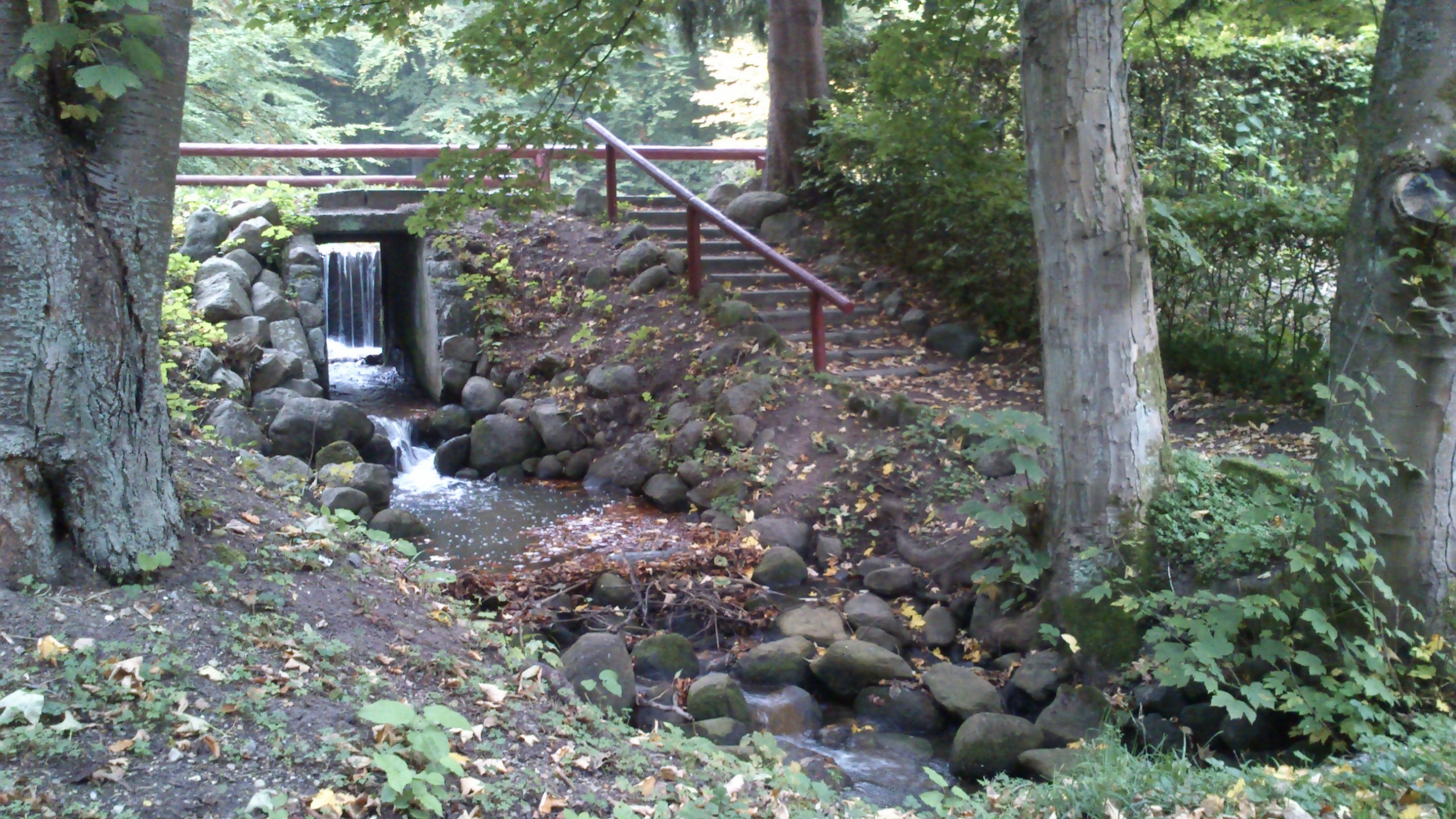
The sluice at Thors Mill.

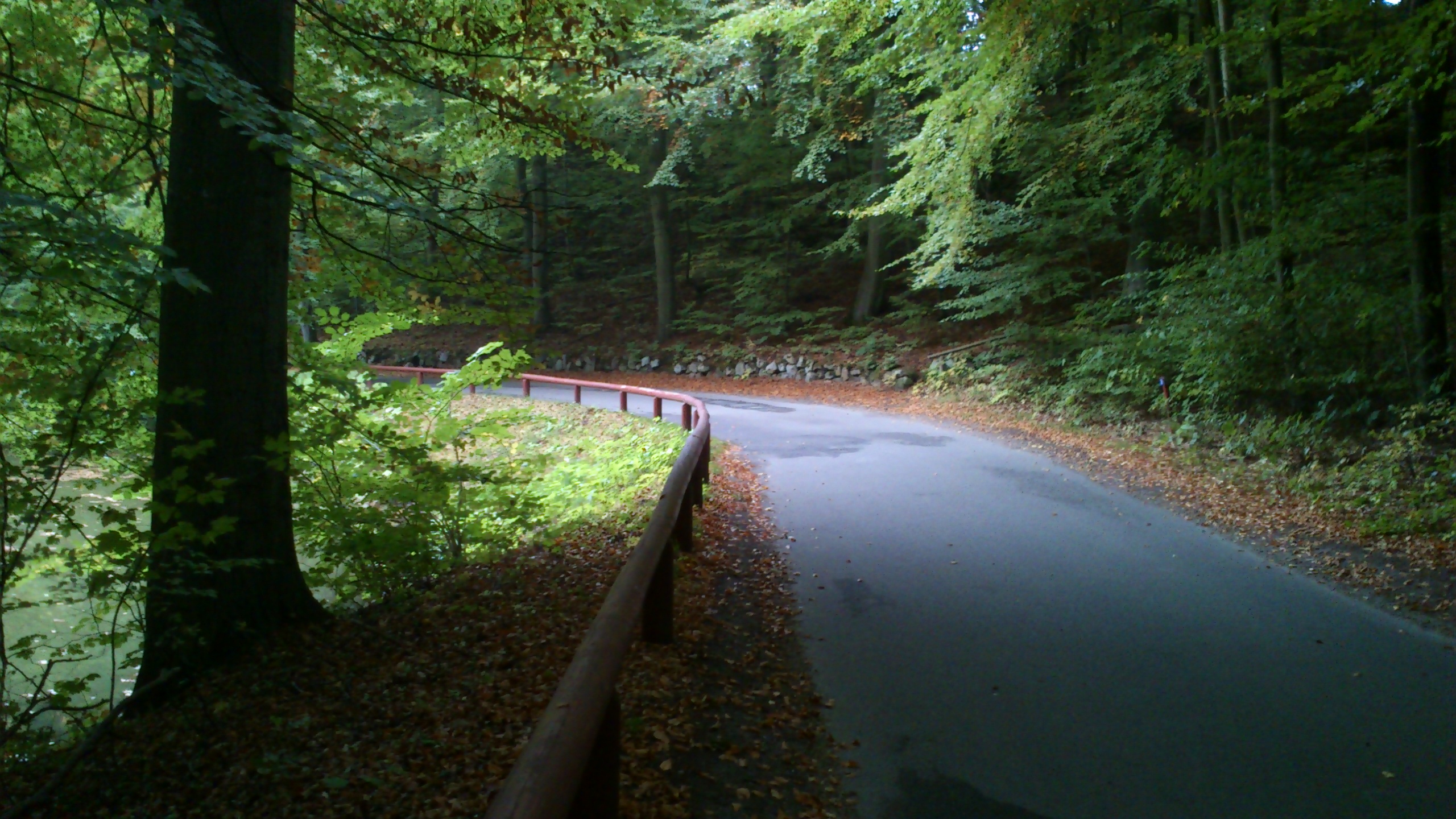
The red painted wooden structures are characteristic for the forests.

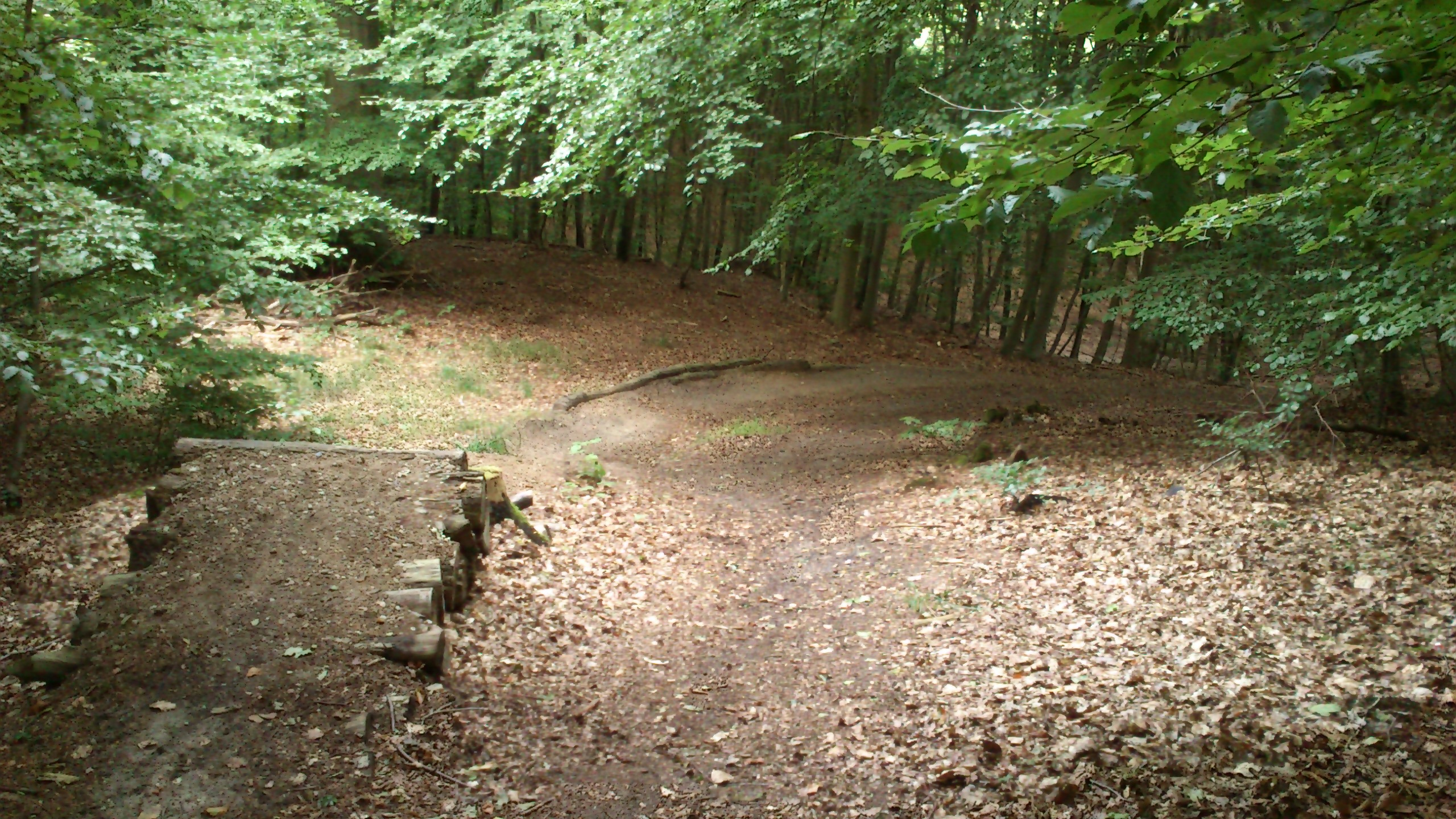
A 25 km mountainbike track runs through the forests.

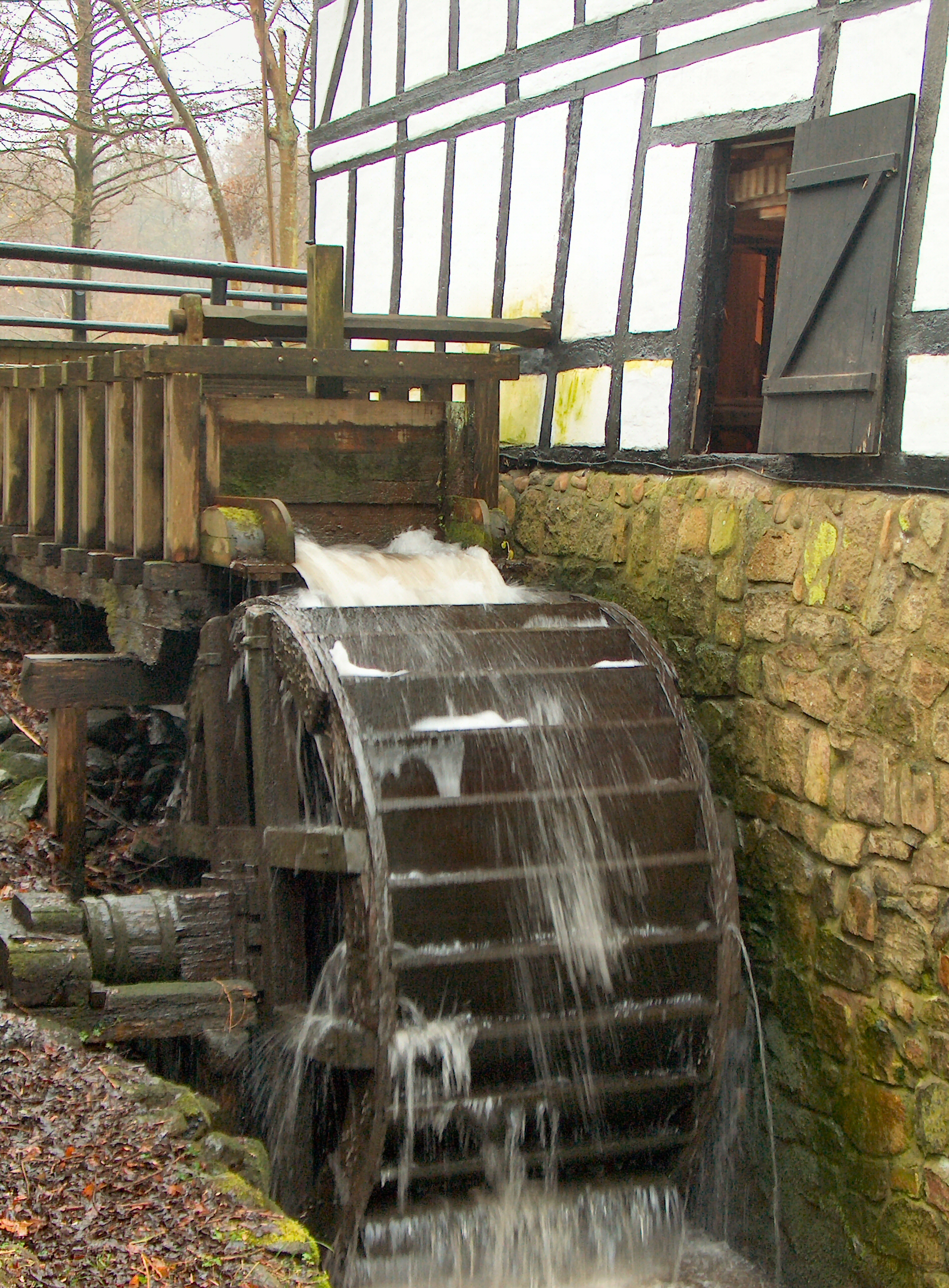
Skovmøllen, showing the waterwheel at work.

== Flora, fauna, and funga ==
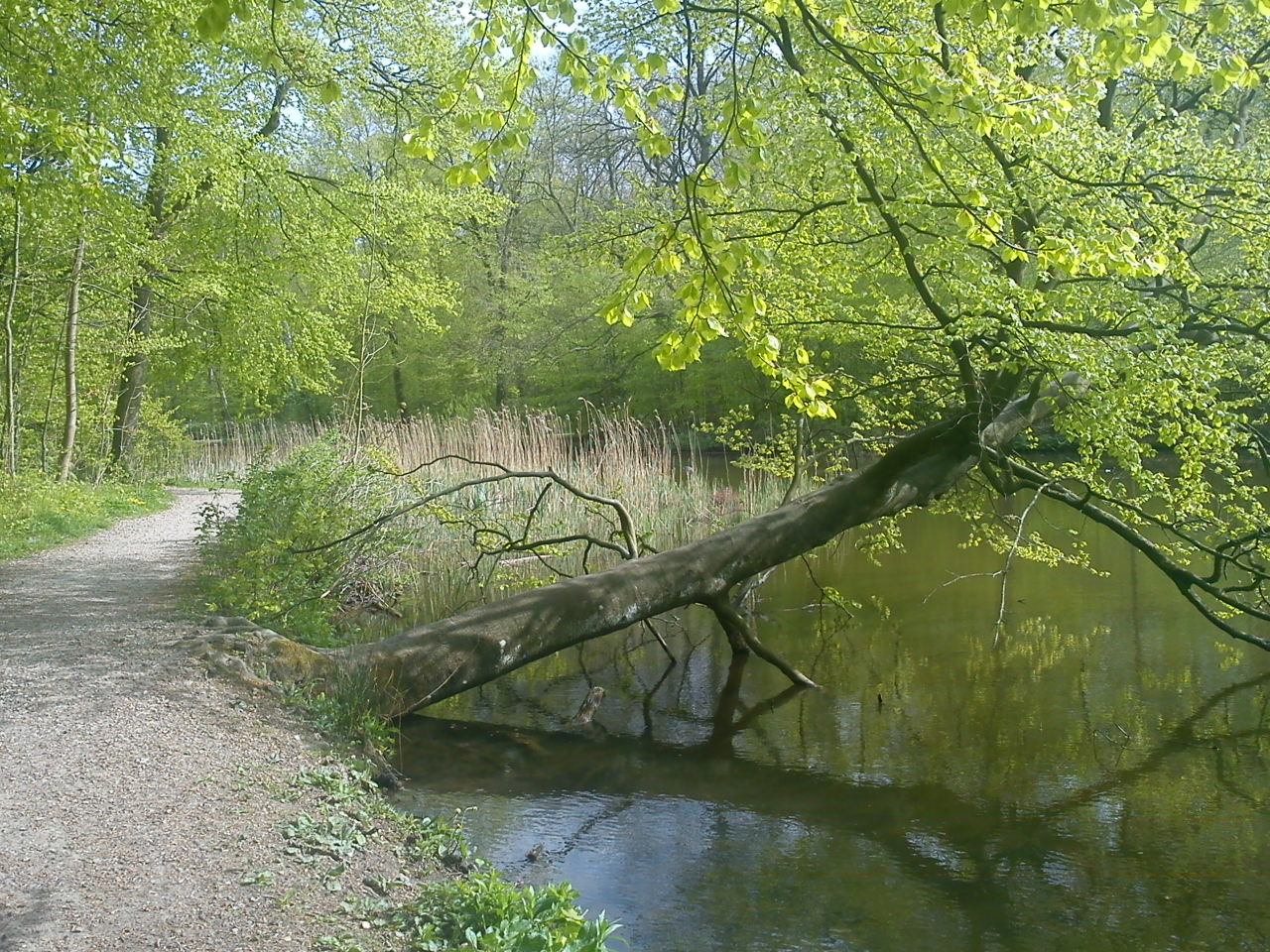
Beech (Fagus sylvatica) is prevalent

In spite of the high level of human activity, Marselisborg Forests does have an interesting flora and fauna and it is not impossible to find the peace and tranquillity, that one normally associates with wild nature. It is one of the few big forests in Denmark, that can present larger connected areas of natural beech wood. Most of the forest is a mixed deciduous forest, with species like beech, ash and maple as the most common. There are other areas dominated by conifer, and oak trees are mixed in throughout the forest.

At Moesgård Museum, sections of the forest have been raised in the 1970s, to recreate various forest-types associated with different epochs since the last ice age. These sections includes ash, birch and alder swamps, linden, elm and oak woods. Mixed in is also the versatile hazel and forest apple.

Marselisborg Forests is home to very rich and varied fungi colonies, with several rare or threatened species. The forests is known for its Mycorrhiza, but also the rare and poisonous Satan's mushrooms, Warted Amanita, and bleeding corals are to be found here. In some years, larger quantities of the edible porcino, trumpet of the dead and charcoal burner can be found, to mention a few examples.

The forests supports a population of northern crested newts. They are common in Denmark, preferring the south-eastern parts of the country, and is thus not a Red List species, but their habitats are threatened on an international scale. Based partly on these facts, a larger part of Marselisborg Forests is to be protected under the EU Habitats Directive and have been designated as area H234.

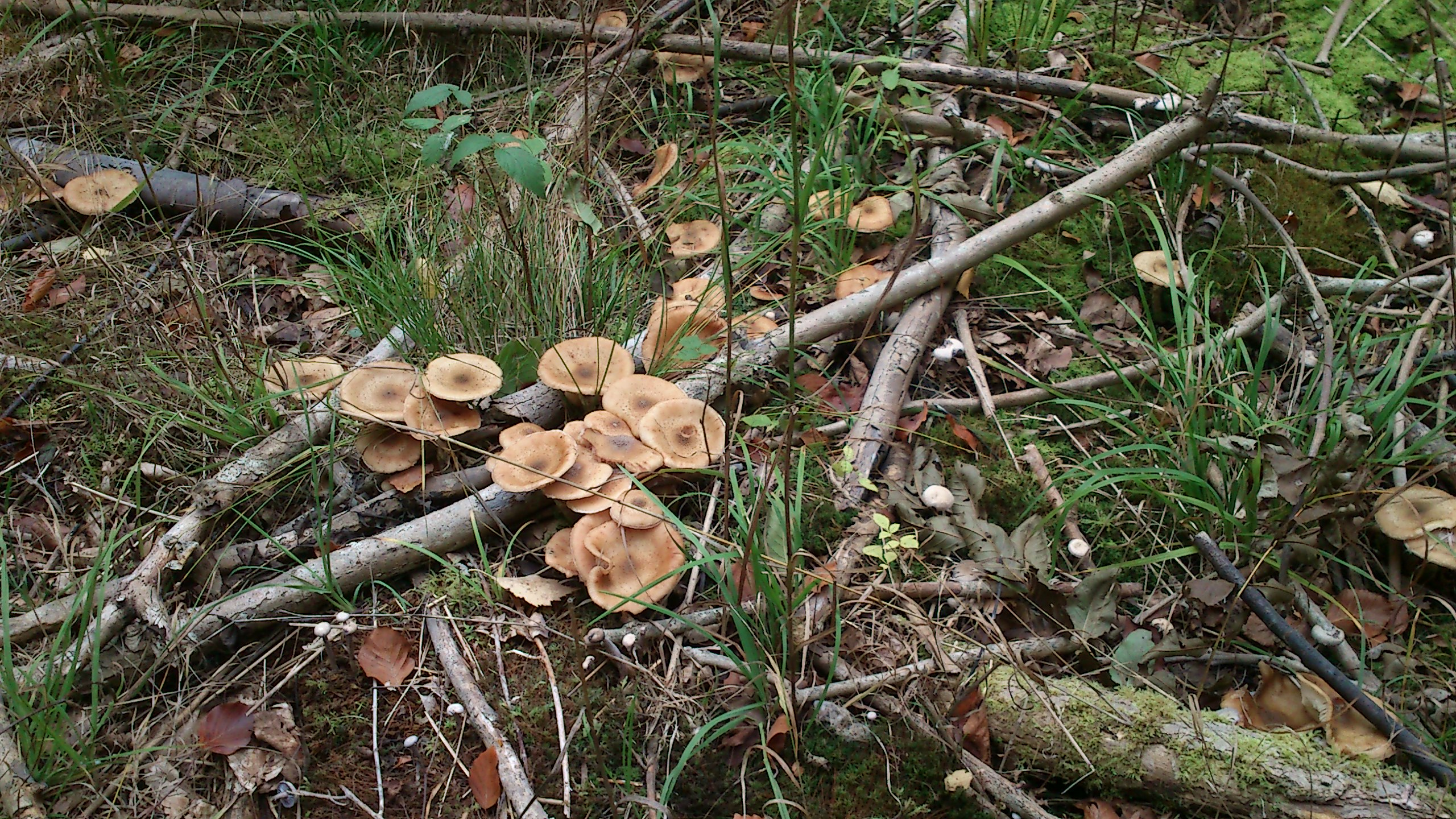
Autumn brings out a variety of mushrooms.

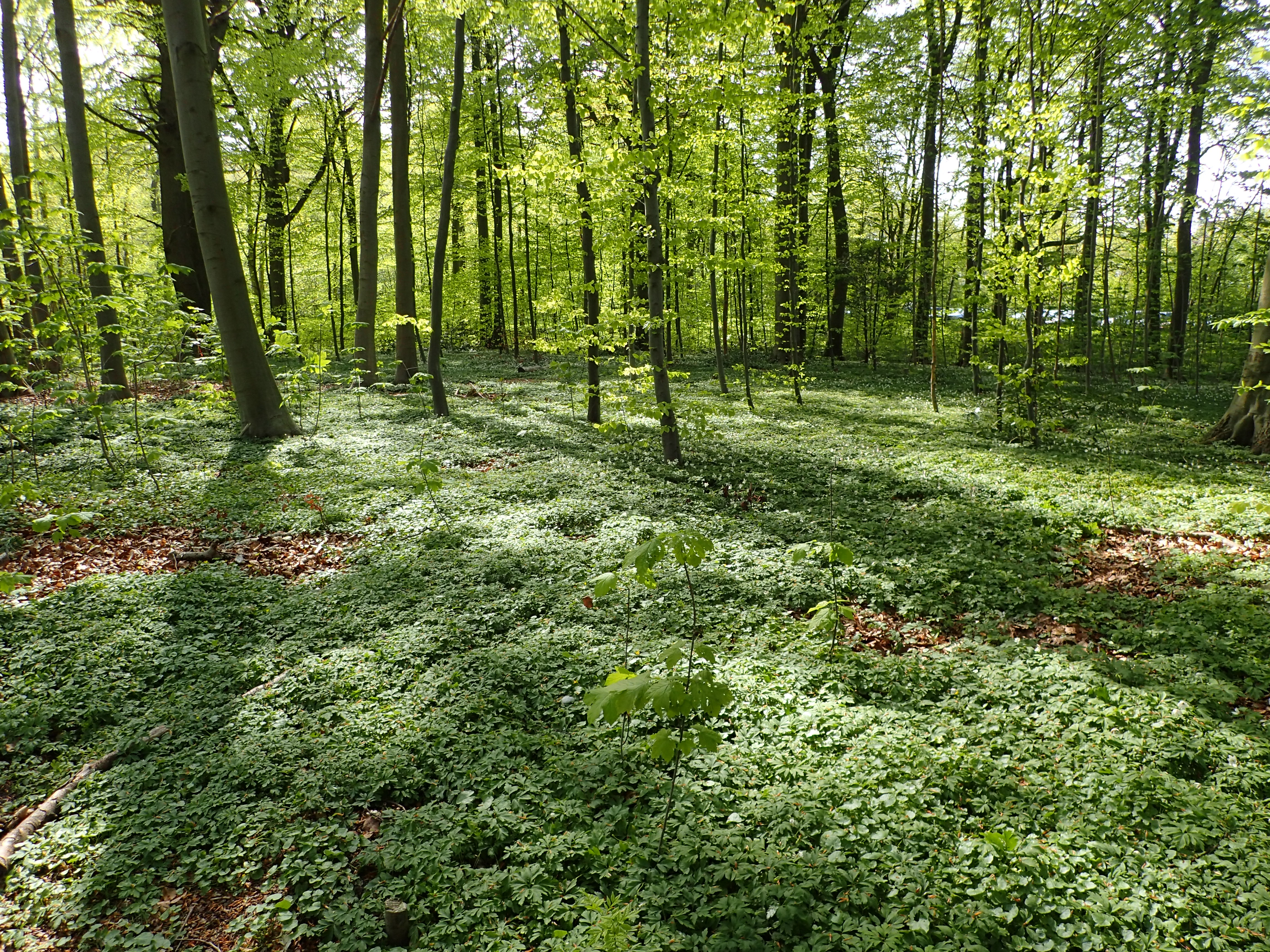
The forest floor of some areas is covered in anemones in the spring, a tell-tale sign of ancient woodland.

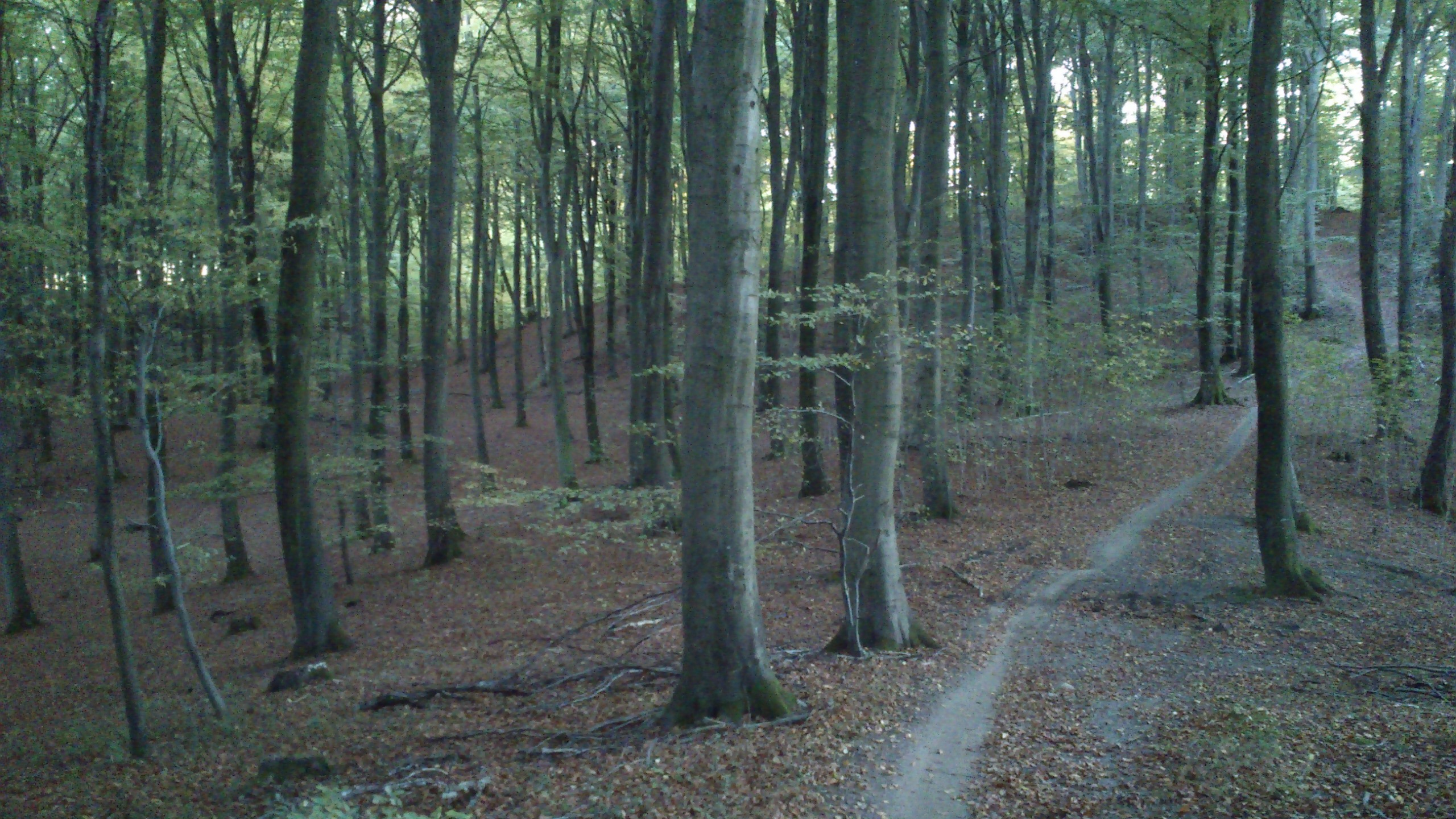
Beech forests can be quite dark.

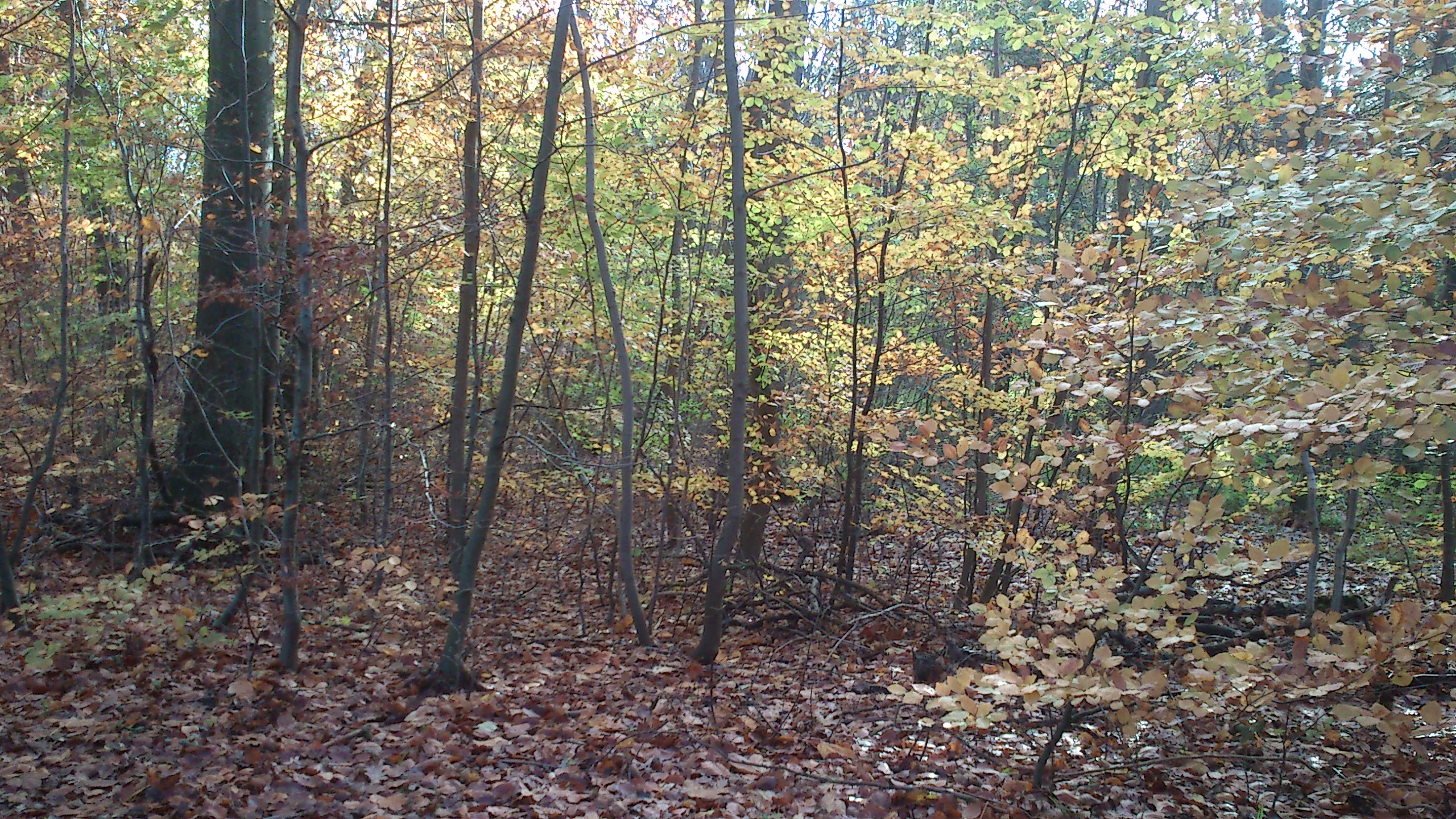
Autumn scene from a natural beech wood habitat in the forests.

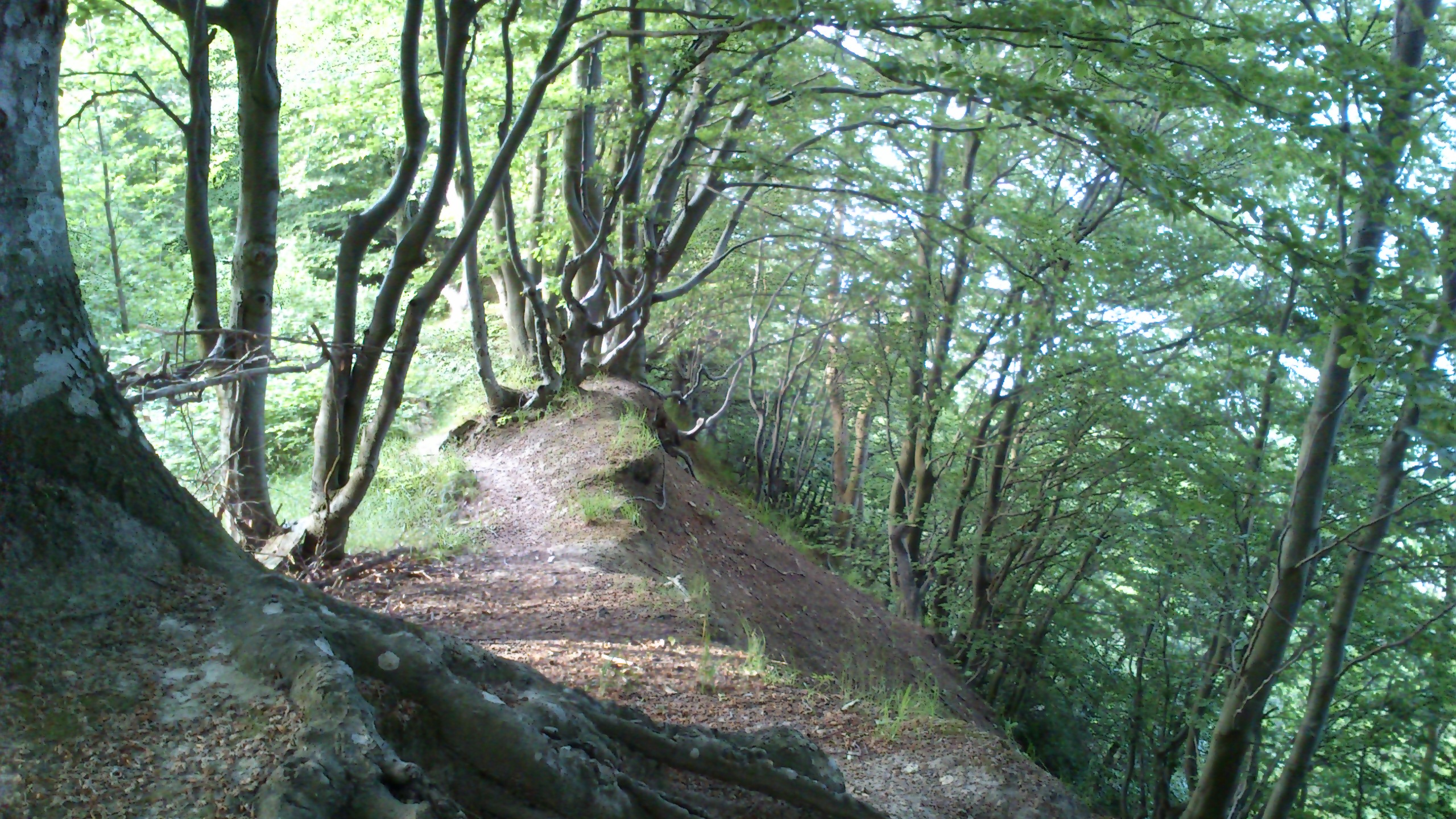
The coastal slopes are quite steep and inaccessible in most places.

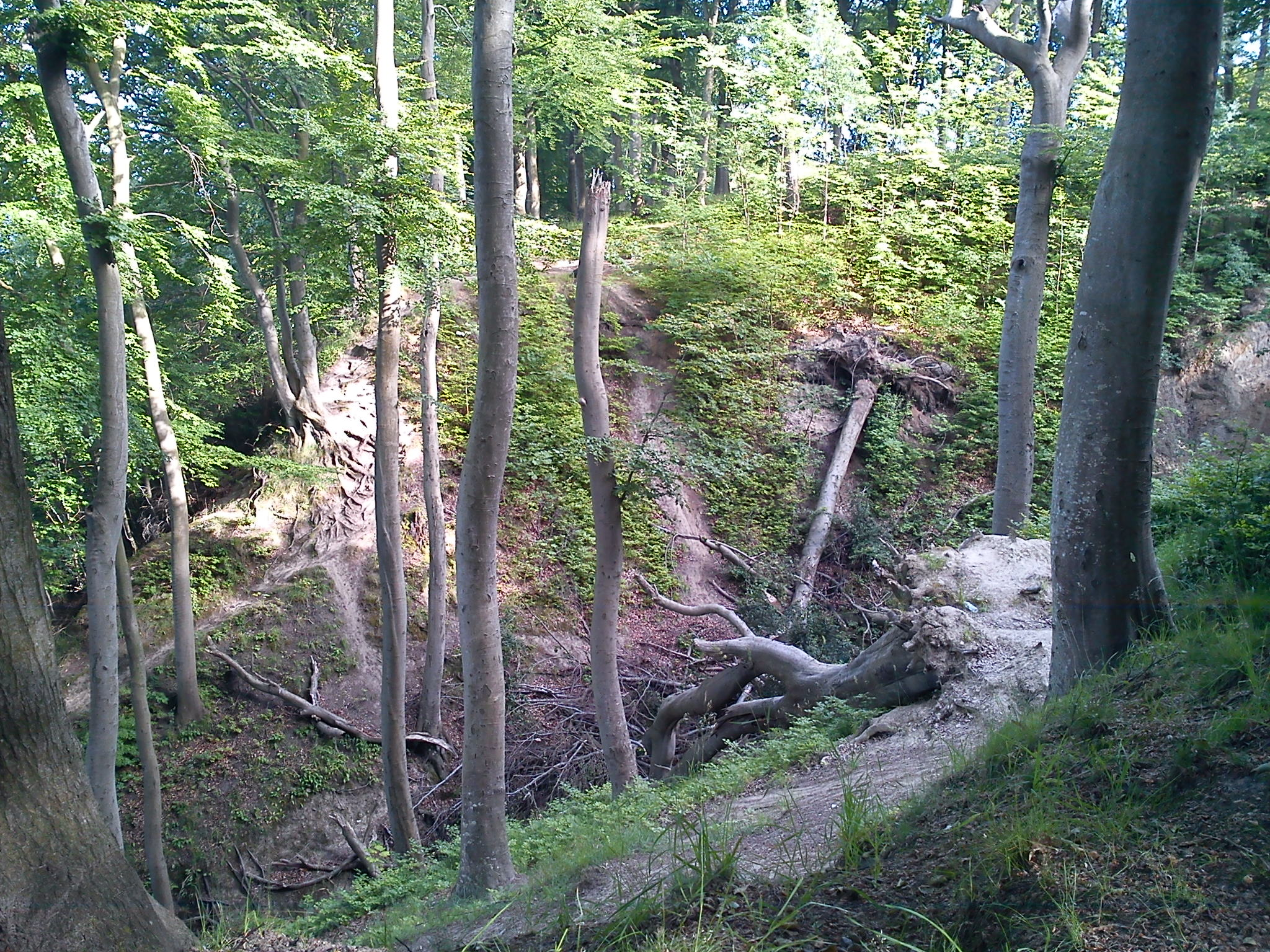
Djævlekløften (Devil's Gap), probably the deepest gully in the forests.

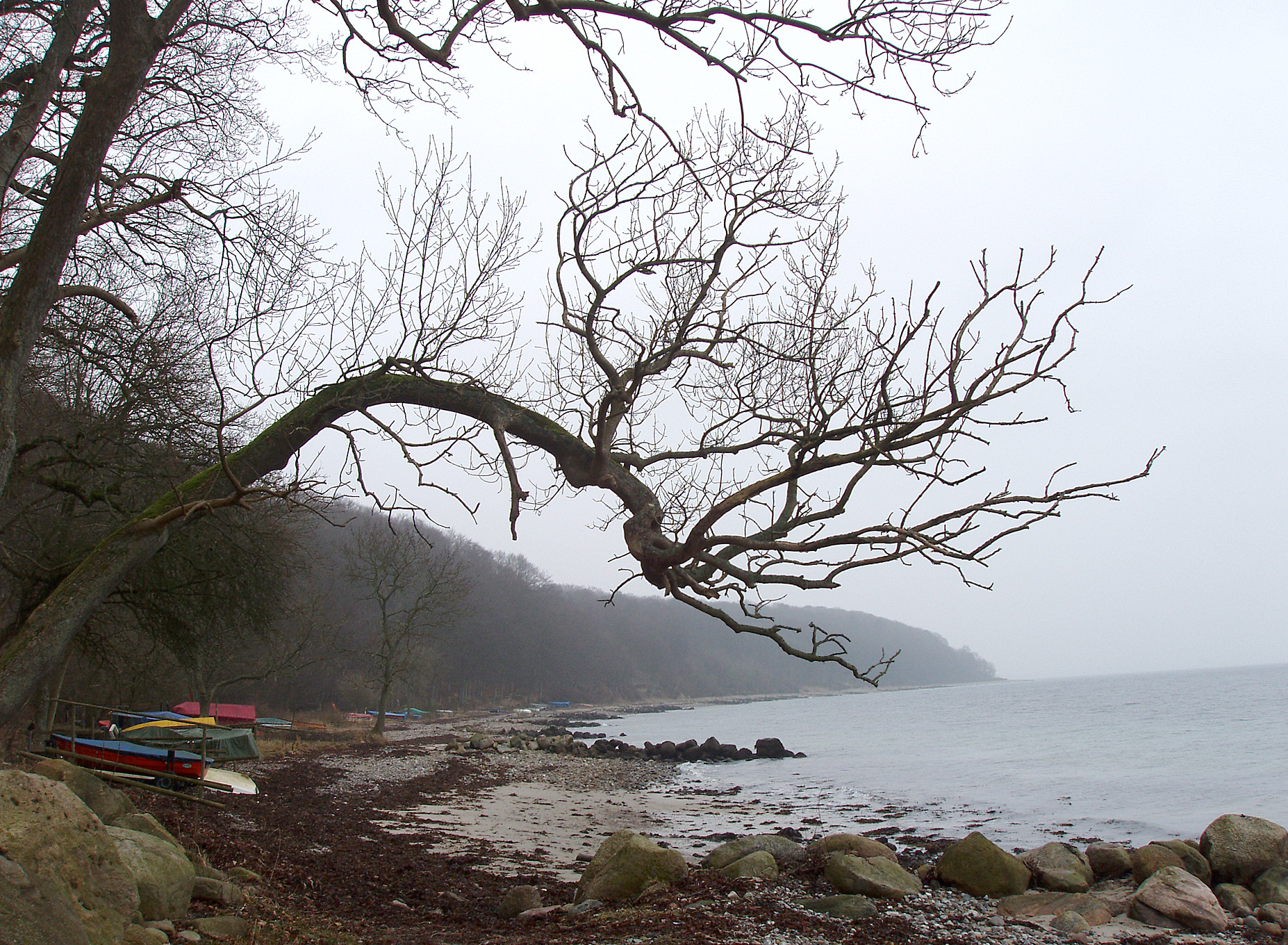
The forests runs along the Bay of Aarhus.

== Sources ==
- Bernhardt Jensen & Peder Jensen: Marselisborgskovene Aarhus University publishing house 1974 (in Danish)
- Lars Friis Olsen: Gennem skovene syd for Århus Klim 2011, ISBN 9788779558656. (in Danish)
- The Coastal Route Aarhus Municipality. Map available. (in Danish)
- Habitat area H234 Danish Nature Agency (2011) (in Danish)
- Great Crested Newt (Triturus cristatus) Habitat species of Denmark. (in Danish)
- Sculpture by the Sea, Aarhus The exhibitions own website
