= Marselisborg Deer Park =

Park in Denmark

Coordinates: 56°7′15″N 10°13′10″E

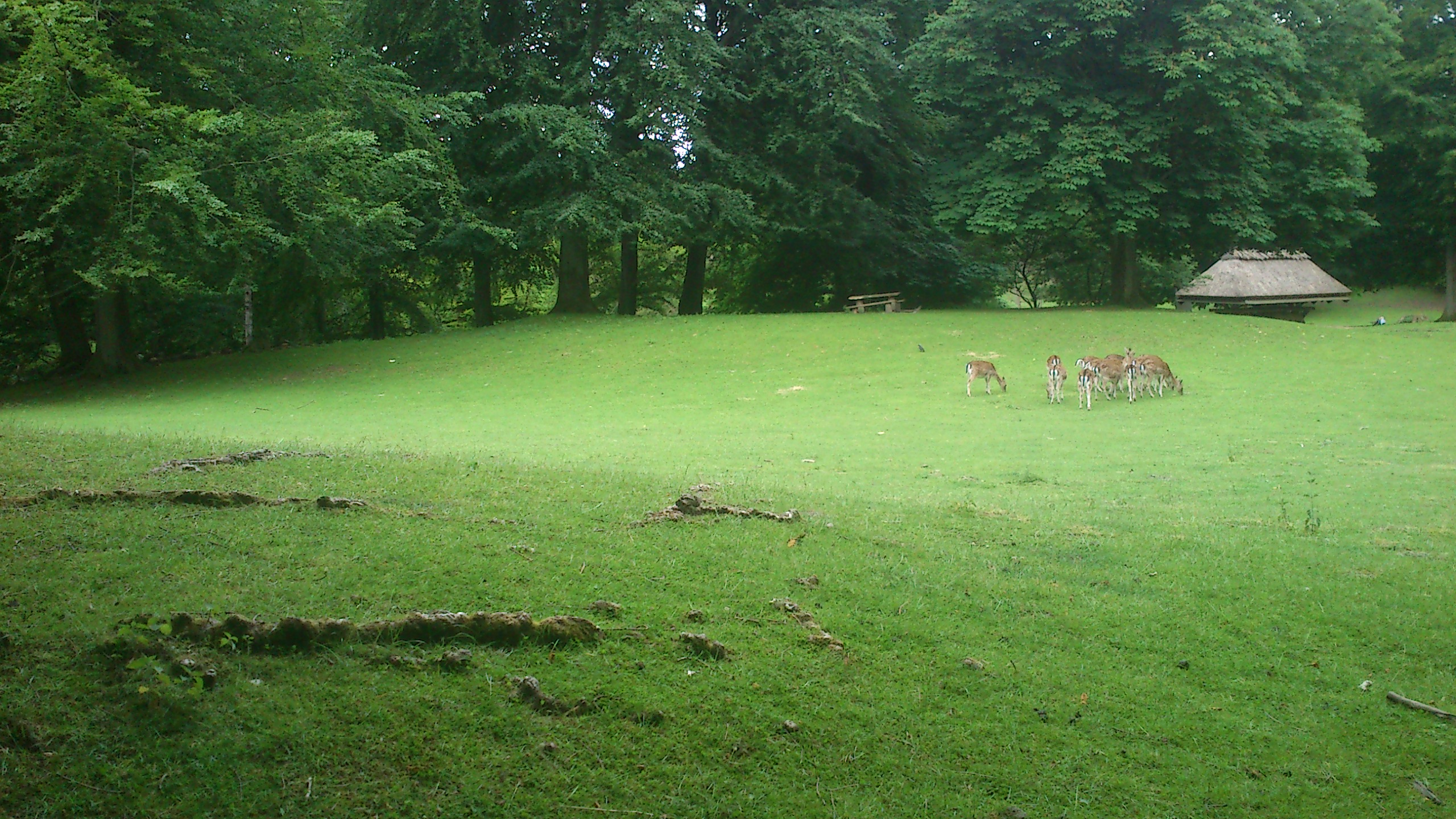
Fouraging roe deer in the Marselisborg Deer Park

Marselisborg Deer Park (Danish: Marselisborg Dyrehave) is a 22 hectares (54 acres) enclosed woodland area in the northern parts of the Marselisborg Forests. The trees are somewhat sparse here and the terrain especially hilly, compared to the surrounding forest.

Marselisborg Deer Park is not a deer park in the original sense, as it is not meant for hunting deer. The idea is more like a small safari park, but just presenting a few common species, without exotic animals. Initially, sika deer were introduced to graze the curvy open woodland hills, but later roe deer and wild boars has been added.

The park was established in 1932 and have since been enlarged several times. It is owned and administered by the Aarhus Municipality.

== Safety and concerns ==
The deer park is open and free for public access year round in the daylight hours, although the following visits are discouraged:

- June–July. Here the female does are nursing their young calves. The does show protective behaviour and might attack humans that come too close. In addition the important nursing might be disturbed too much, giving the calves a lower chance of survival.
- September–November. Here the deer are mating and the bucks will be in a rut and showing aggressive behaviour. Especially the sika bucks with their antlers poses a threat to visitors. In addition, disturbances might postpone the mating, giving the outcome calves a lower chance of survival, if the animals are stressed too much.
- Stormy weather. Many of the old trees poses a danger, with heavy falling branches.

These are explicit dangers, but there are a lot of general concerns too to take into account, when visiting the area. Many of them are obvious to most people, but here is a few important ones that might not be:

- Feeding. Deer and many mammals cannot digest bread, pasta or similar food items and they will fall ill if they eat it. Instead the animals can be fed with carrots and apples, which are normally considered safe. The wild boars must never be fed anything.
- Chasing. Chasing smaller animals will stress them unnecessary and can make them sick or even kill them. Chasing larger animals might make them aggressive and cause them to attack. Visitors can choose to interact with animals, if the animals approach in a friendly or neutral manner.
- Flocks. Many animals have a natural flock behaviour and it can be dangerous for humans to be caught inside a flock, even if the individual animals does not pose a threat when encountered by themselves. Stay on the outskirts of flocks.
- Collecting food. Animals in the wild live from what the surrounding nature offers them, so do not collect larger quantities of food items, as the animals might need them for their survival. Do not collect the chestnuts or mast in the Marselisborg Deer Park.
- Litter and garbage. Animals might try to eat litter and it can harm them, in some cases kill them. Do not leave litter or garbage in nature.

The wild boars are permanently fenced in their own enclosure, as they are a dangerous animal.

== Gallery ==
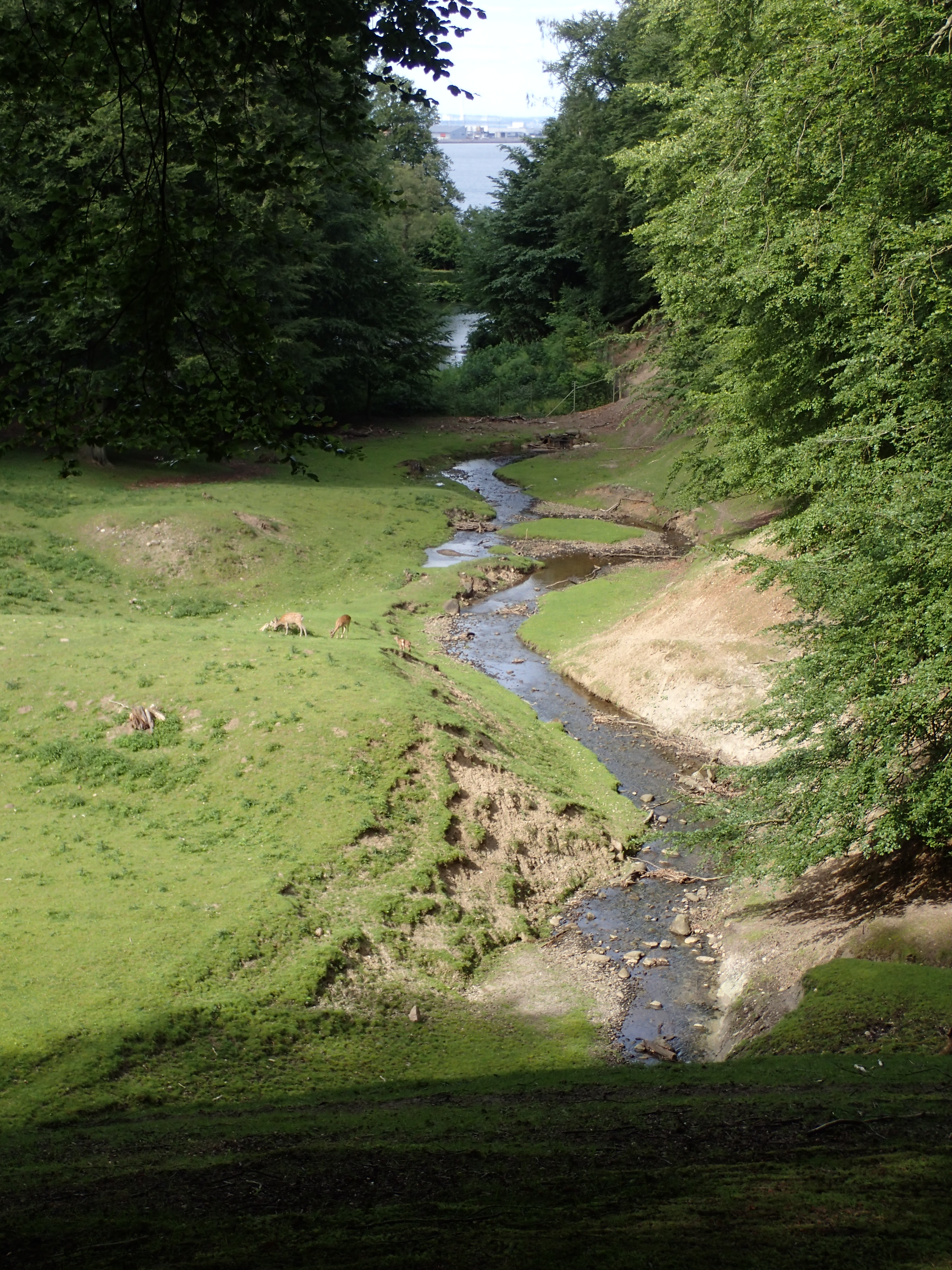
The vista known as Udsigten (The View)

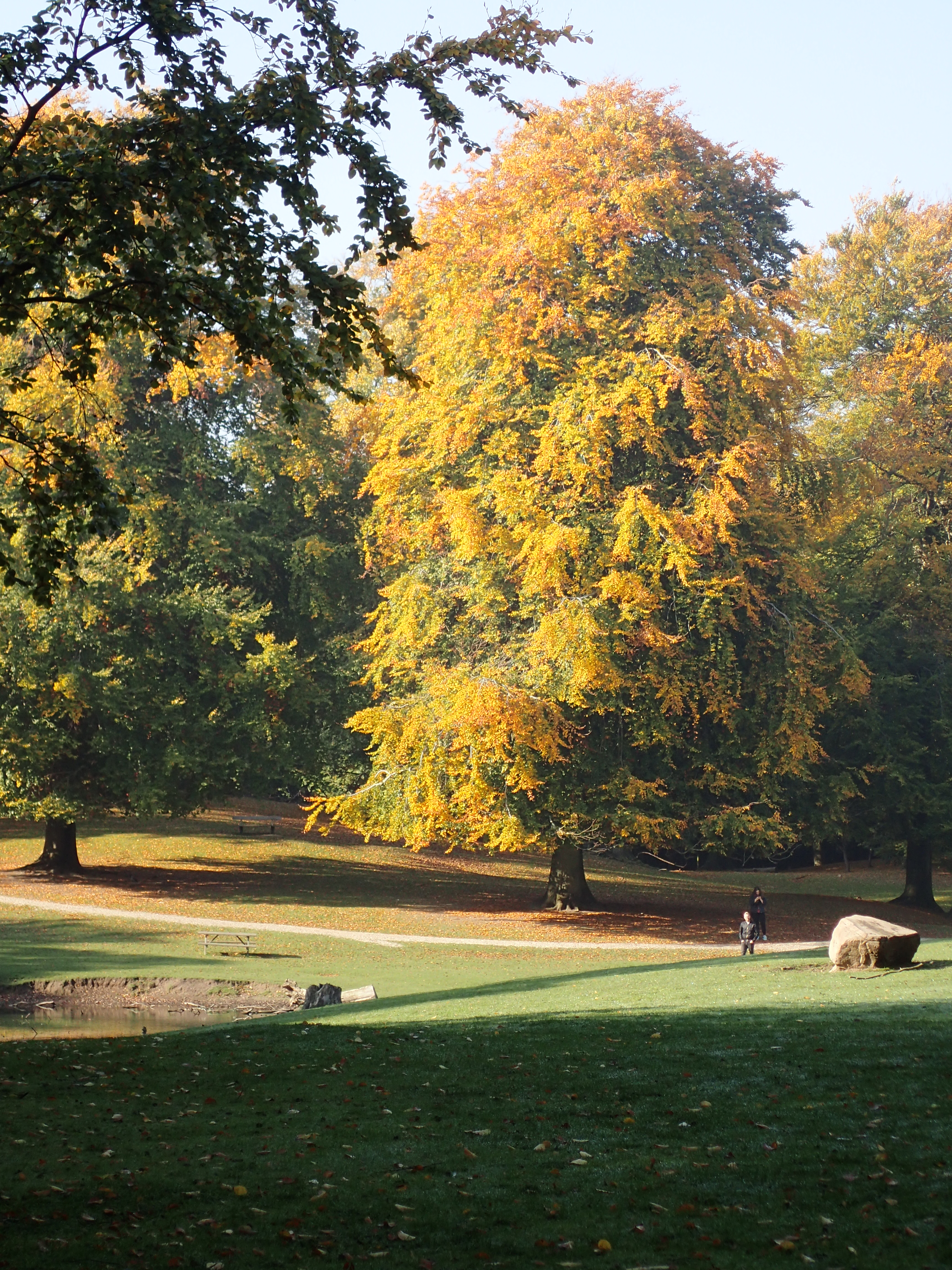
Autumn scene

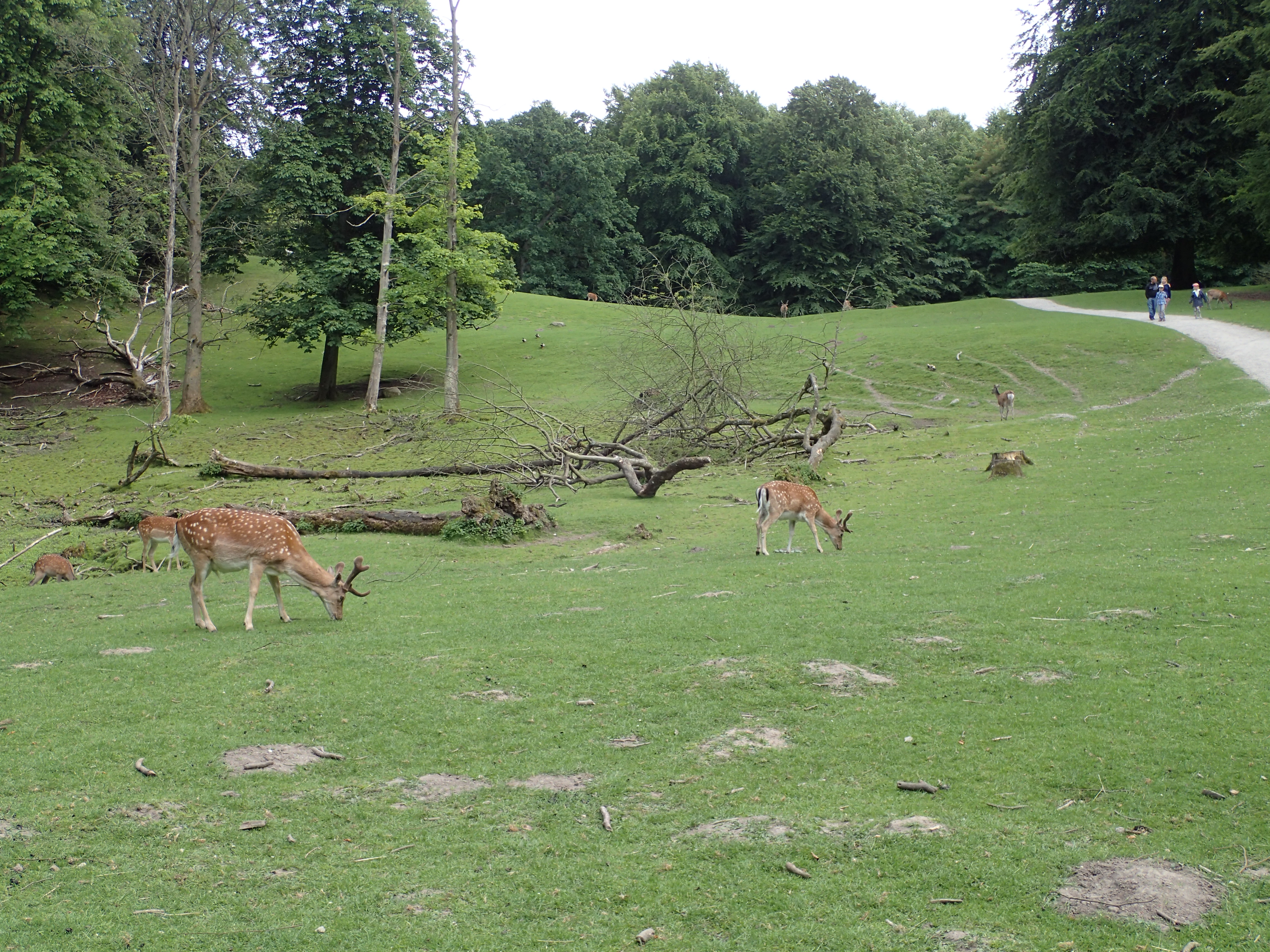
The landscape

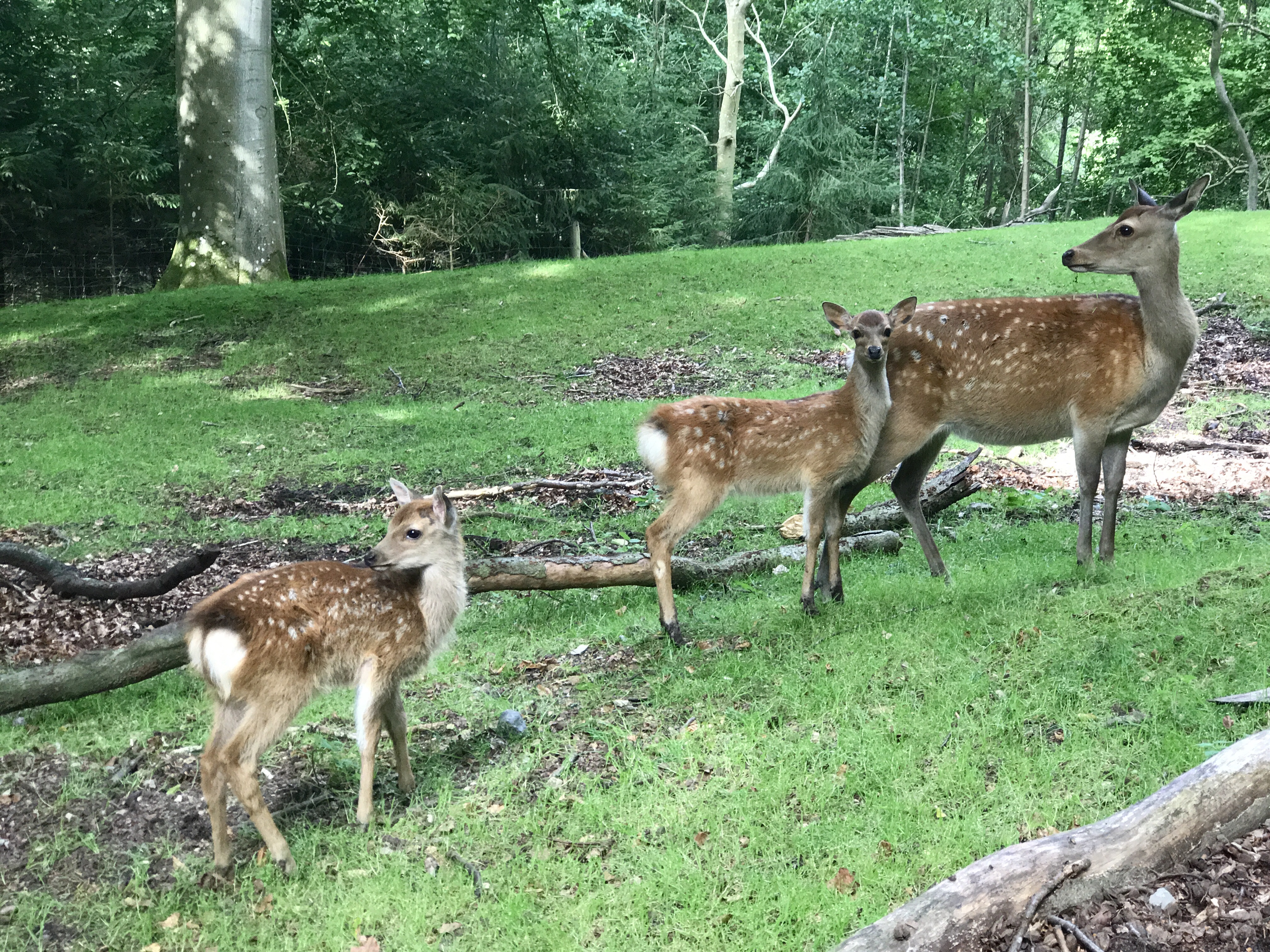
Roe deer

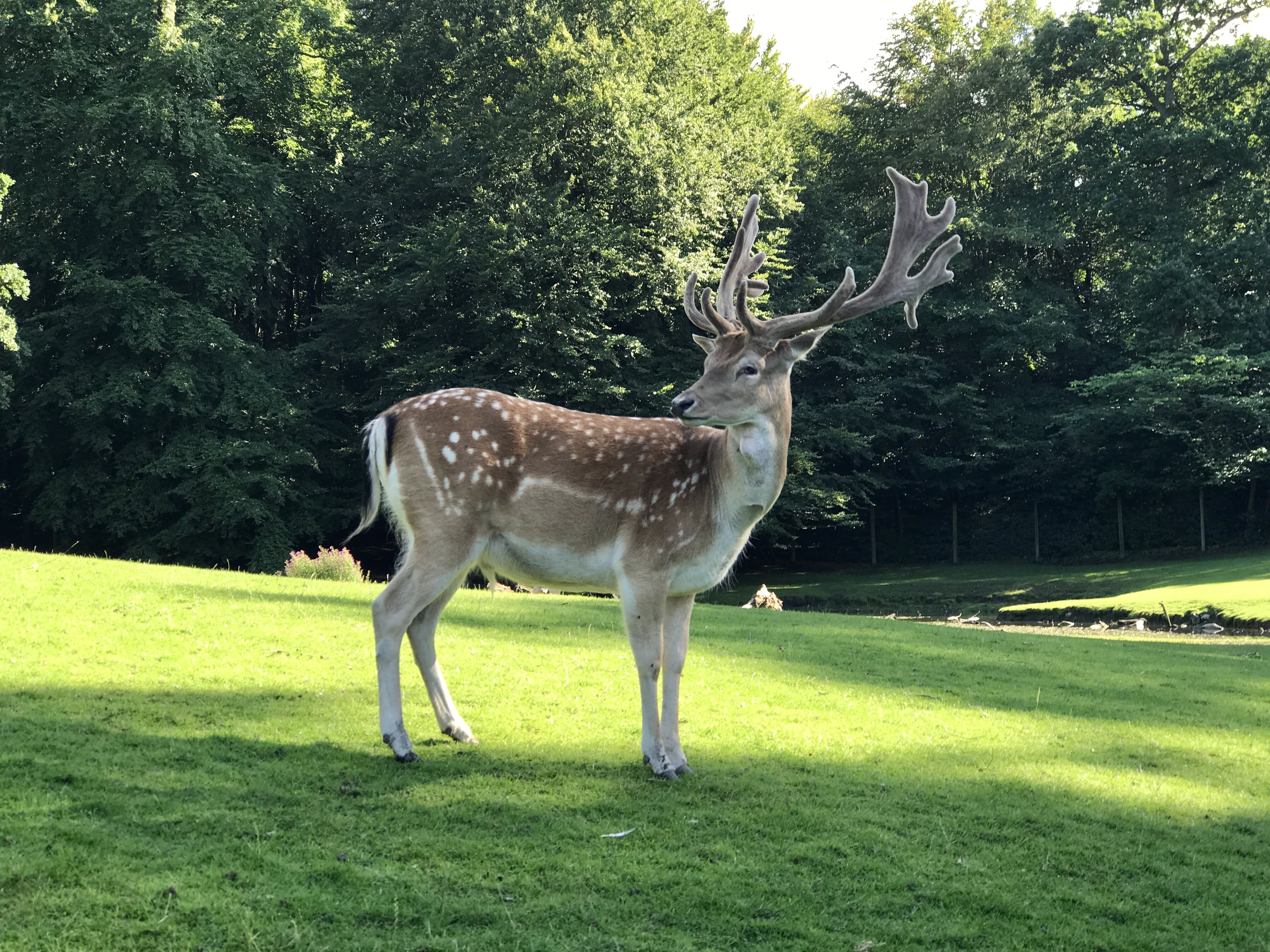
Roe deer stag

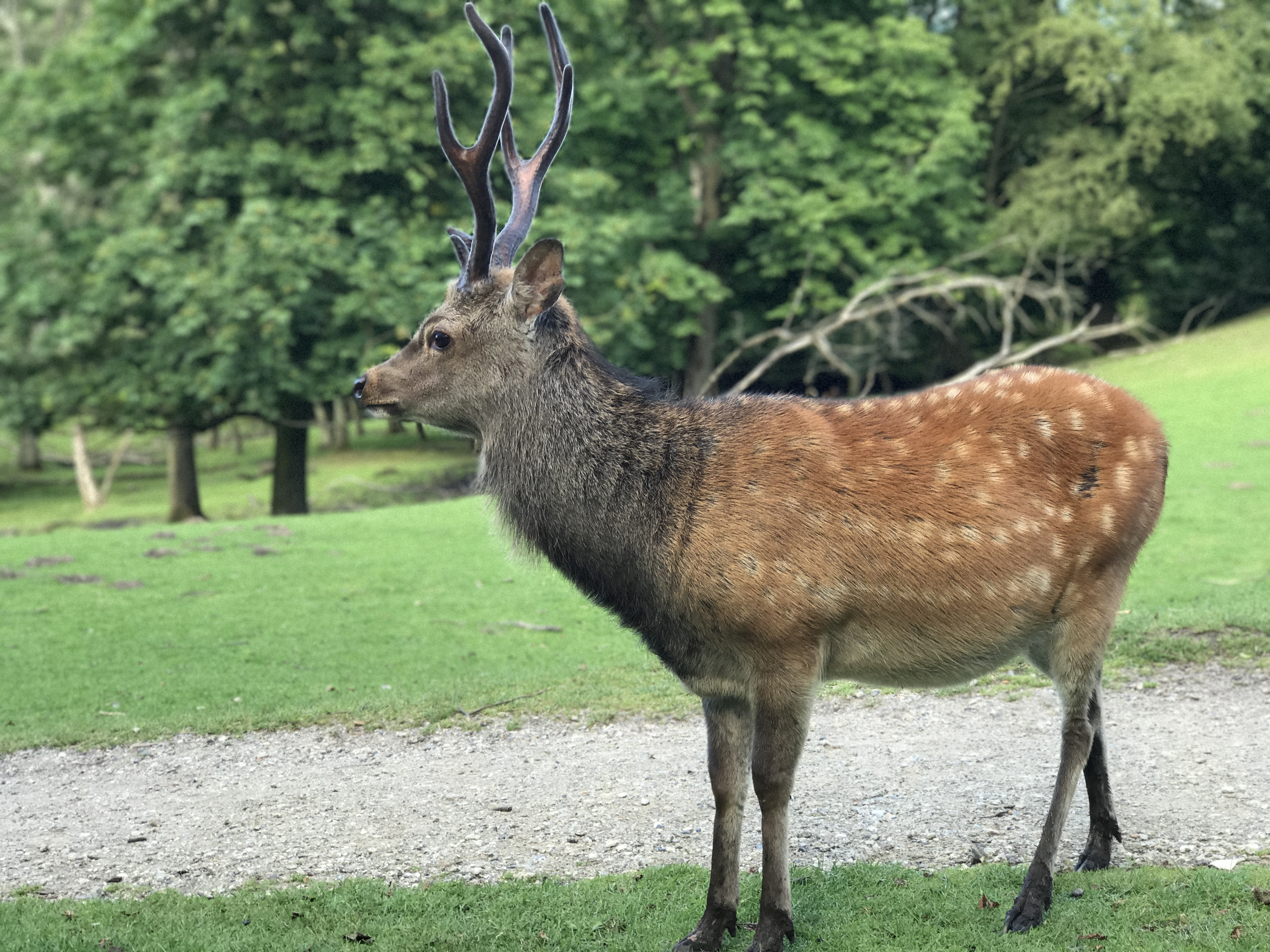
Sika deer

== Sources ==
- Information on the Deer Park Aarhus Municipality (in Danish)
