= List of parks in Aarhus =

This is a partial list of publicly accessible parks in Aarhus, Denmark. Aarhus contains more than 100 parks. Some are managed by Aarhus Municipality, a few are private, and others are managed by institutions such as hospitals and universities.

Name	Type	Image	Created	Size	Location
Aarslev Møllepark	Park and forest		1860s	5.6 ha	56.153768°N 10.088128°E
Botanical Gardens	Botanical garden, statues, and a playground		1875	17.8 ha	56°09′38″N 10°11′27″E
Bellevue	Urban beach park			6.2 ha (1.5 km beach)	56°11′26.5″N 10°14′53″E
Brabrand Søpark	Park			2 ha	56.150889°N 10.107305°E
Byvangen	Park			1.6 ha	56.130601°N 10.170828°E
Cereshaven	Park		2019 (1865)		56°09′22.5″N 10°11′38.0″E
City Hall Park	Park and sculpture park		1941	1.85 ha	56.151735°N 10.201824°E
Concert Hall Park	Park		1980	1.75 ha	56.1526°N 10.2003°E
Danmarks Japanske Have	Japanese-style garden		1998	1.2 ha	56.238429°N 10.158821°E
Den Permanente	Beach park		1933	2.4 ha	56°10′36″N 10°13′54″E
Eskelunden	Natural space and concert facilities			40.3 ha	56.139140°N 10.160217°E
Forestry Botanical Garden	Botanical and sculpture park		1923	5 ha	56°7′32″N 10°12′04″E
Forteparken	Park			6.8 ha	56°11′43.8″N 10°13′22.3″E
Frederiksbjerg Bypark	Park and playground			1.1 ha	56.147159°N 10.189839°E
Frue Kirkeplads	Cemetery park		?	0.15 ha	56°09′30.8″N 10°12′15.5″E
Hasle Hills	Landscape park and natural space		2003	15.5 (71.7) ha	56.167°N 10.142°E
Holme Bypark	Park			4.6 (14) ha	56.110004°N 10.179981°E
Ingerslevs Boulevard	Park		1912, 1948 and 1996	0.8 ha	56.144354°N 10.192535°E
Klokkerparken	Park		1963	7.2 ha	56.164174°N 10.155641°E
Langdalen	Natural space		2009	18.8 ha	56.162315°N 10.109417°E
Langenæs Park	Park			8.9 ha	56°08′35.0″N 10°10′50.8″E
Marienlyst Park	Park		1988	20 (83) ha	56.1811°N 10.1596°E
Marselisborg Deer Park	Forest park		1932	22 ha	56°7′15″N 10°13′10″E
Marselisborg Hospitals Park	Park		1913	2.8 ha	56°08′26.6″N 10°11′17.5″E
Marselisborg Palace Park	Sculpture park		1902	13 ha	56°07′38.9″N 10°12′02.3″E
Mindeparken & Rømerhaven	Park, monument and sculpture park		1925	16.5 ha	56°7′46″N 10°12′26″E
Mølleparken	Park		1926	1.1 ha	56.1559°N 10.2004°E
Nordre Cemetery	Cemetery park		1876	14.8 ha	56°10′4″N 10°12′51″E
Præstevangen	Park		1958	1.5 ha	56°09′50.9″N 10°10′05.3″E
Risskovpark	Park			8.2 ha	56.185287°N 10.233878°E
Skanseparken	Park		1902	1.4 ha	56.1454°N 10.2070°E
Skjoldhøjkilen	Landscape park and natural space		2005	134 ha	56.169°N 10.126°E
Skæring Hede	Urban forest		1946	5 ha	56.2374°N 10.3378°E
St. Olufs Cemetery	Park		1700s	0.12 ha	56.158406°N 10.213002°E
Tangkrogen	Park and event facilities		c. 1900	5 ha	56.138161°N 10.209472°E
Vennelystparken	Park		1830	7 ha	56.1644°N 10.2078°E
Vestereng	Natural space		1987	60.8 ha	56°11′12″N 10°10′47″E
Vestre Cemetery	Cemetery park		1927	16.9 ha	56°9′34.92″N 10°10′48.74″E
Vorrevangsparken	Park		1950	3.1 ha	56°11′11.4″N 10°12′11.1″E
Vårkjærparken	Park			4 ha	56.126146°N 10.147796°E
University Park	Landscape park		1933	15 ha	56.168°N 10.203°E
Åkrogen	Urban beach park			18 ha (1.3 km beach)	56.205172°N 10.283763°E
Åparken	Park		2008	1 ha	56.155646°N 10.194369°E
Åby Park	Park			2.2 ha	56.153346°N 10.164692°E
