= Skæring =

- Neighborhood
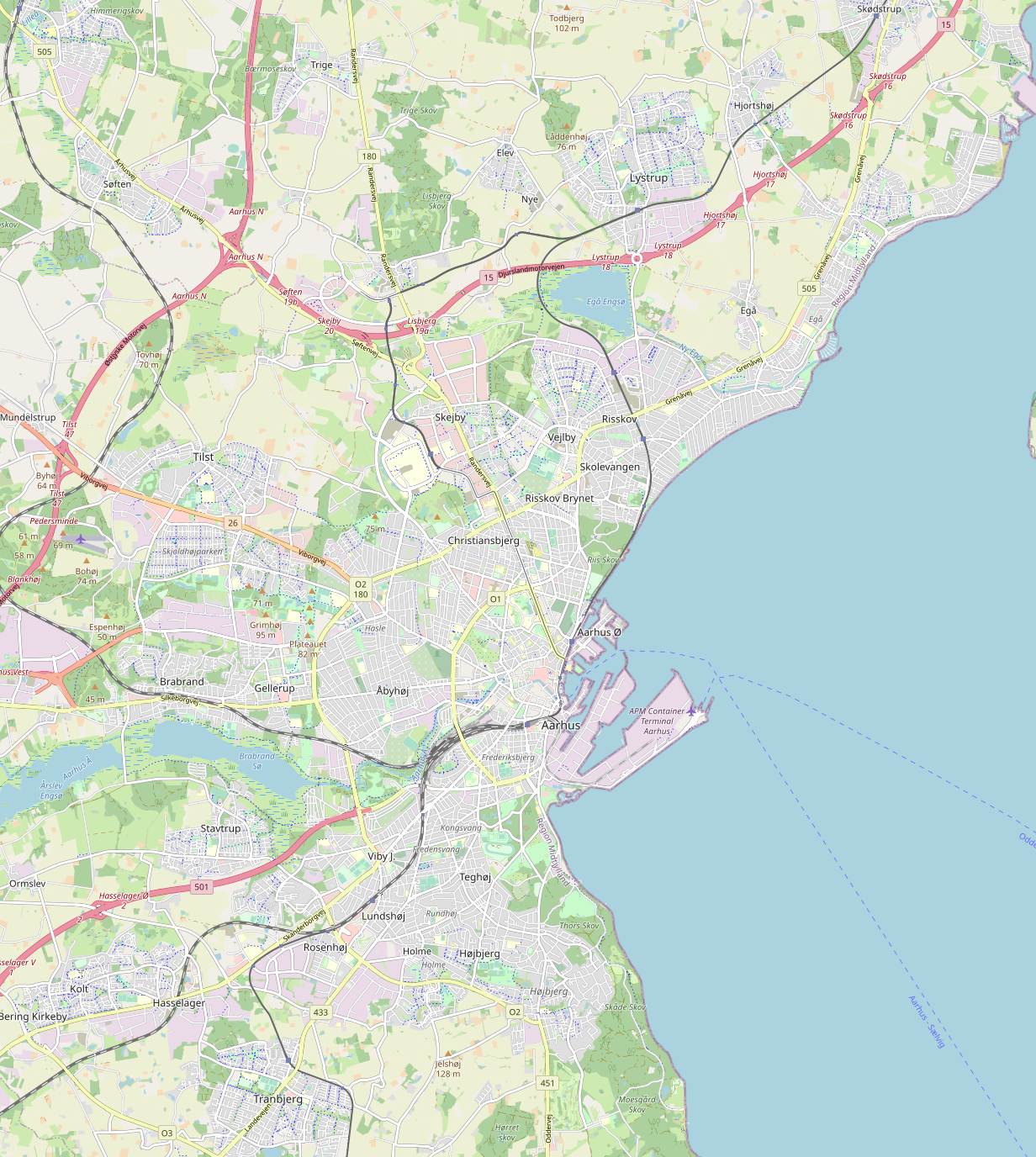
- Location within Aarhus Location within Central Denmark Region Location within Denmark
- Coordinates: 56.227135°N 10.299601°E
- Country: Kingdom of Denmark
- Regions of Denmark: Central Denmark Region
- Municipality: Aarhus Municipality
- District: Egå
- Postal code: 8250

Skæring is a suburb of Aarhus in Denmark. It is situated some 10 km. north-east of Aarhus C and is one of Aarhus's wealthiest suburbs. Skæring Parish had a population of 4,977 as of 2006 of which 4,402 were members of the Church of Denmark. Skæring is known for its beaches, the marina Kaløvig Bådelaug and the former military shooting range Skæring Hede which is today a public park and memorial for five resistance fighters who were executed there during the Second World War. In addition, two movies have been filmed in Skæring.
