= Axel Poulsen =

Danish sculptor

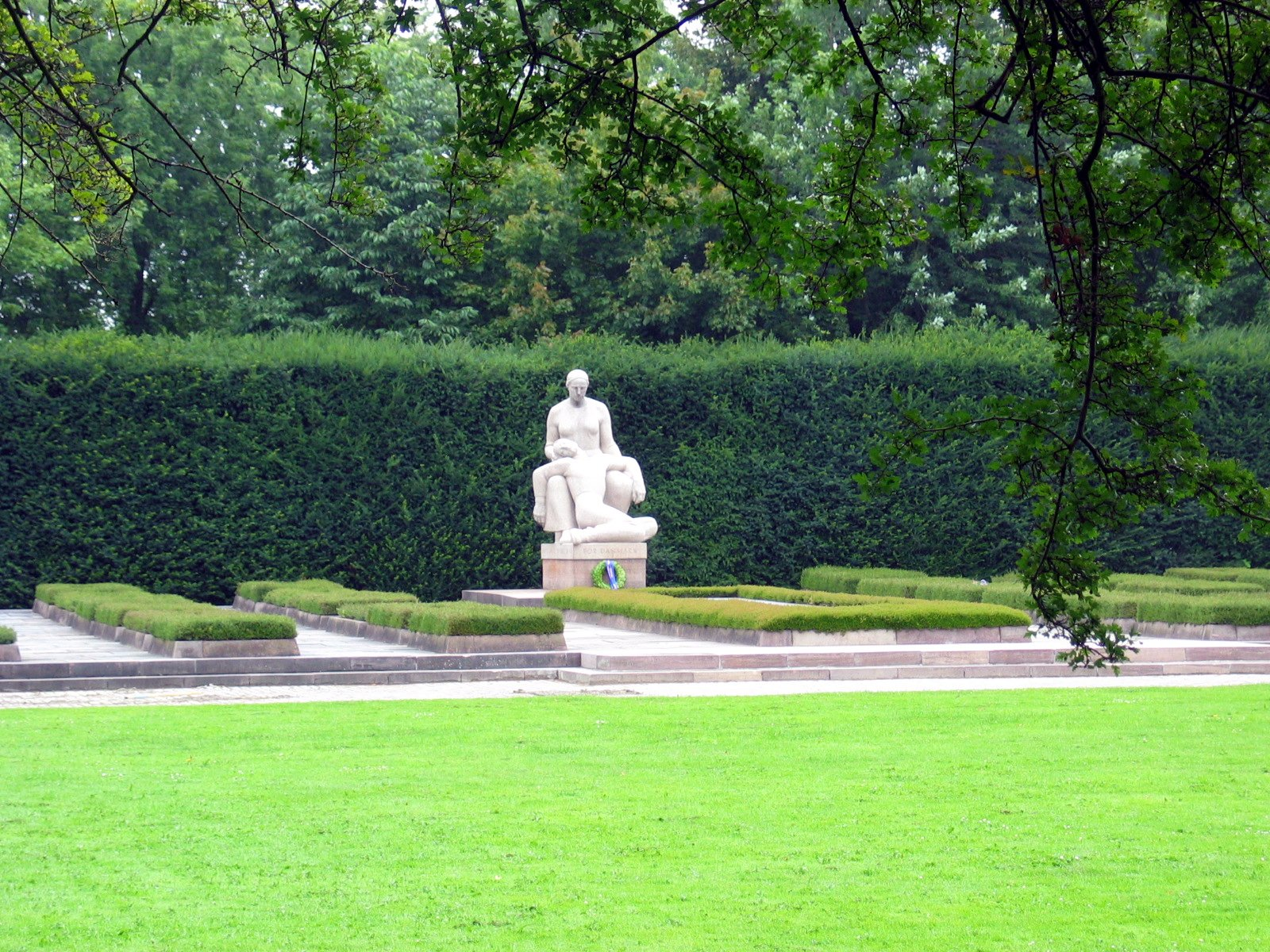
Axel Poulsen's memorial in Ryvangen Memorial Park

Rikard Axel Poulsen (1 December 1887 – 22 August 1972) was a Danish sculptor. He is remembered for his memorials in Copenhagen's Fælledparken and Aarhus' Marselisborg Mindeparken.

== Biography ==
Born in Copenhagen, he was brought up in Odense where he was introduced to wood carving by his father. He went on to study sculpture at the Royal Danish Academy of Fine Arts under Carl Aarsleff and Joakim Skovgaard. He was awarded the Academy's gold medal in 1913 for his relief Christus uddriver Kræmmerne af Templet (Christ drive the moneylenders from the temple). From 1912, he exhibited at the Charlottenborg Spring Exhibition. He then spend a few years in Rome and Florence where in 1914 he completed his Den første Kærlighed (First Love) in the Italian Renaissance style, inspired by Donatello's figure of St John. The work represented a new theme, the sexuality youth.

In 1917, he married the Swedish writer and artist Elisabeth Bergstrand-Poulsen. They lived in Charlottenlund to the north of Copenhagen and had two sons, Ivar (1918) and Hans (1920).

In 1926, he won the competition for a bronze memorial of the First World War. Known as the Genforenings-monument (Reunion Monument), it is installed at the entrance to Copenhagen's Fælledparken. Other monuments included the Marselisborg memorial to the First World War, the Second World War memorial in Ryvangen (1946) and Kongehyldningsmonument (King's Tribute Monument) in Viborg (1965) depicting Margrethe I and Erik of Pomerania. In all these works, Poulsen succeeds in expressing human feelings in natural and simple style.

== Awards ==
In 1914 Poulsen was awarded the Eckersberg Medal and in 1963 he received the Thorvaldsen Medal. In 1962, he was decorated Commander of the Order of the Dannebrog.

== Literature ==
- Adriansen, Inge (2003). Nationale symboler i det Danske Rige, 1830-2000: Fra fyrstestat til nationalstater. Museum Tusculanum Press. pp. 476–. ISBN 978-87-7289-794-3.
