= Elisabeth Bergstrand-Poulsen =

Swedish writer, painter and textile artist

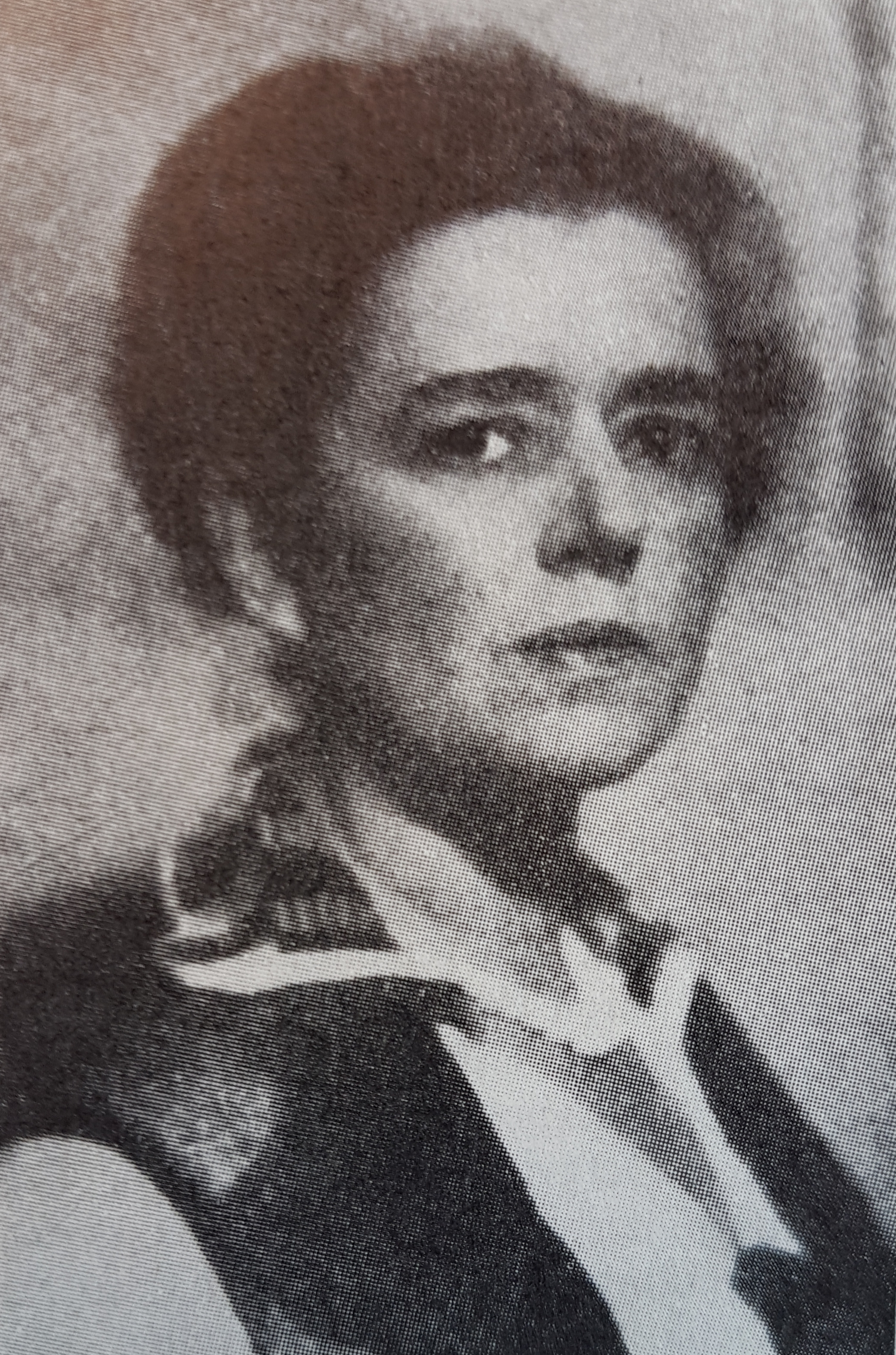
Elisabeth Bergstrand-Poulsen

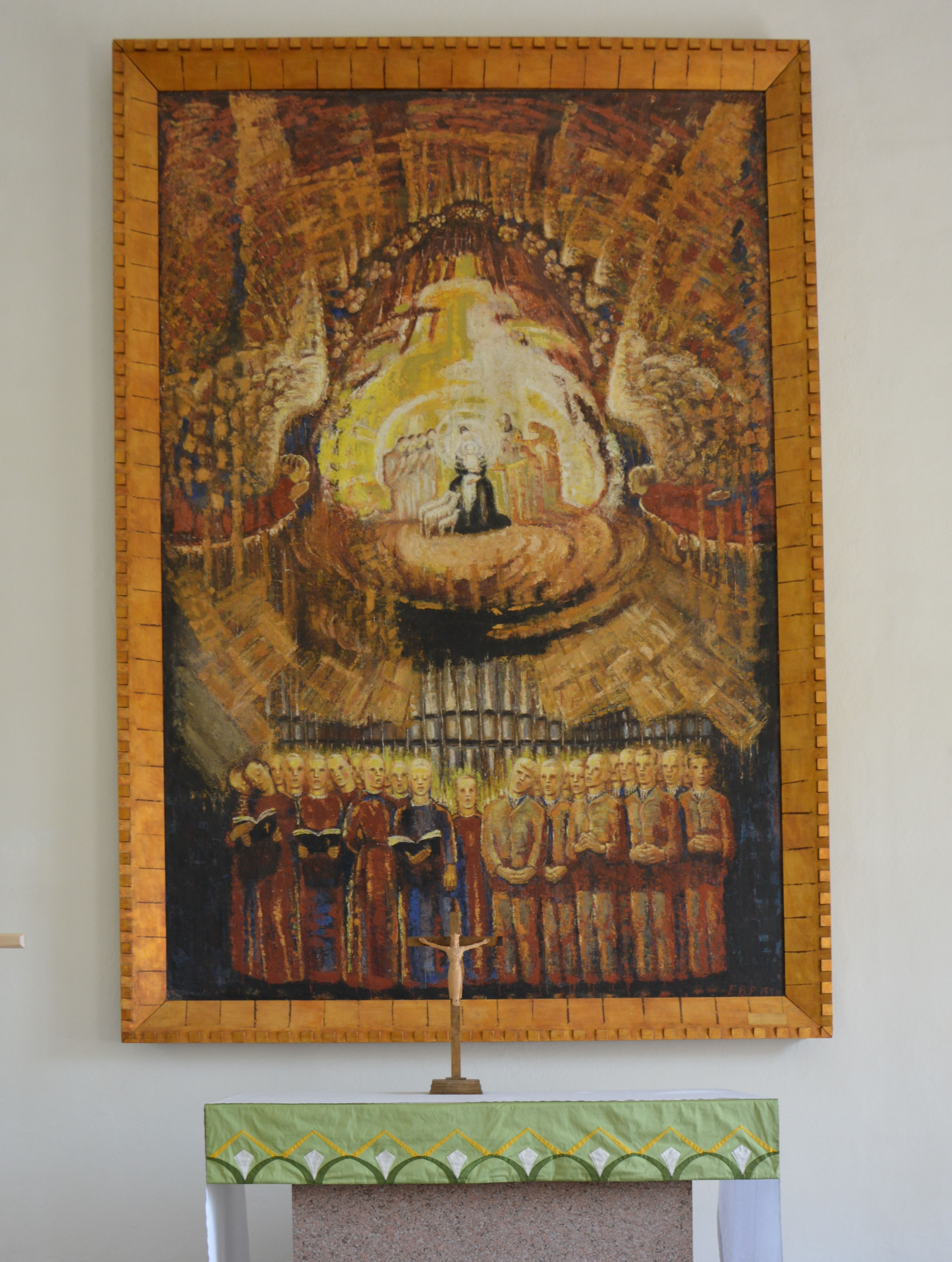
Altarpiece in Långasjö Church

Anna Elisabeth Albertina Bergstrand-Poulsen (12 November 1887 – 18 February 1955) was a Swedish writer, painter, illustrator and textile artist who lived in Denmark after marrying the sculptor Axel Poulsen in 1917. As a painter, she exhibited from 1922, initially specializing in child portraits, later in religious works including altarpieces. She embarked on writing in 1926 with a copiously illustrated book on people from her native Småland, the first of many successful works influenced by her strong Christian beliefs and childhood memories. Several were translated into Danish, Dutch, German or English.

== Early life and education ==
Born on 12 November 1887 in the village of Långasjö in south-eastern Sweden, Anna Elisabeth Albertina Bergstrand was the daughter of the schoolteacher and organist Per Magnus Bergstrand (1855–1927) and Anna Hammargren (1861–1946), a devout Christian. She was the second of six children. Brought up in a musical family, her father taught her school subjects and the piano. As the family could not afford to send her to high school, she helped in the home and read widely. She became a close friend of Gertrud Lilja, with whom she shared her interest in art and literature.

After studying at the Kunsthögskolan in Stockholm (1909–1913), thanks to a Swedish grant she went on an extended study trip to France, Italy and Algeria (1913–1916). While in Rome, she met the sculptor Rikard Axel Poulsen (1887–1972) whom she married in November 1917 after returning to Denmark. They had two sons, Ivar (1918) and Hans (1920).

== Career ==
=== As an artist ===
She first exhibited her child paintings in Copenhagen's Charlottenborg at the 1922 autumn exhibition, followed by interiors at the 1923 spring show. Her portraits and interiors were painted in the naturalistic style of the times. Her artwork extended to etchings, lithography and ceramics. In 1926, her exhibition of some 60 illustrations depicting the people of Småland at the Gummeson Gallery in Stockholm met with enthusiastic acclaim. During the nine years following her marriage, together with her husband she applied her artistic talents to designing their home in Charlottenlund to the north of Copenhagen. Inspired by their common interest in Italy and the Renaissance, it was known as Klosteret (The Cloister) with its impressive church-like appearance. In her memoirs published in 1940, she explains the significance of the house in the following terms:

We love our home, created with irrational materials for a house: longings and dreams, impressions from east and west, from sun and moon, i.e. from Italy, Greece, France and Denmark. It was built by man's faith and woman's weak power. And as an altar erected for all that is beautiful.

In later life, she turned to religious works, especially tapestry, creating Kvinnans årstider (The Woman's Ages) which was woven in Barbro Nilsson's workshop in Stockholm and is now preserved in Småland's Museum. In 1950, she created an altarpiece for Långasjö Church but it was not inaugurated until 1957, two years after her death.

=== As a writer ===
Bergstrand-Poulsen did not embark on her literary career until she was 39 when she published Värendskvinnor från Långasjö socken i bilder och ord (1926), presenting women from her native Småland parish in a richly illustrated book. Other successful works include Hjältar och hjältedåd (1930), Glad och god skal människan vara – och stark (1934) and Väven (1941). All were inspired by her strong Christian beliefs and memories of her childhood in Småland. In 1940 she published her memoirs as Hök, får jag låna dine vingar? (Hark, Can I Borrow your Wings?). Her most popular works such as Väven and Kronan were translated into several languages.

Elisabeth Bergstrand-Poulsen died in Charlottenlund on 18 February 1955 and is buried in Ordrup Cemetery.
