= Skæring Hede =

Forest and memorial park in Skæring

Skæring Heath
- Skæring Mindelund
- Skæring Hede
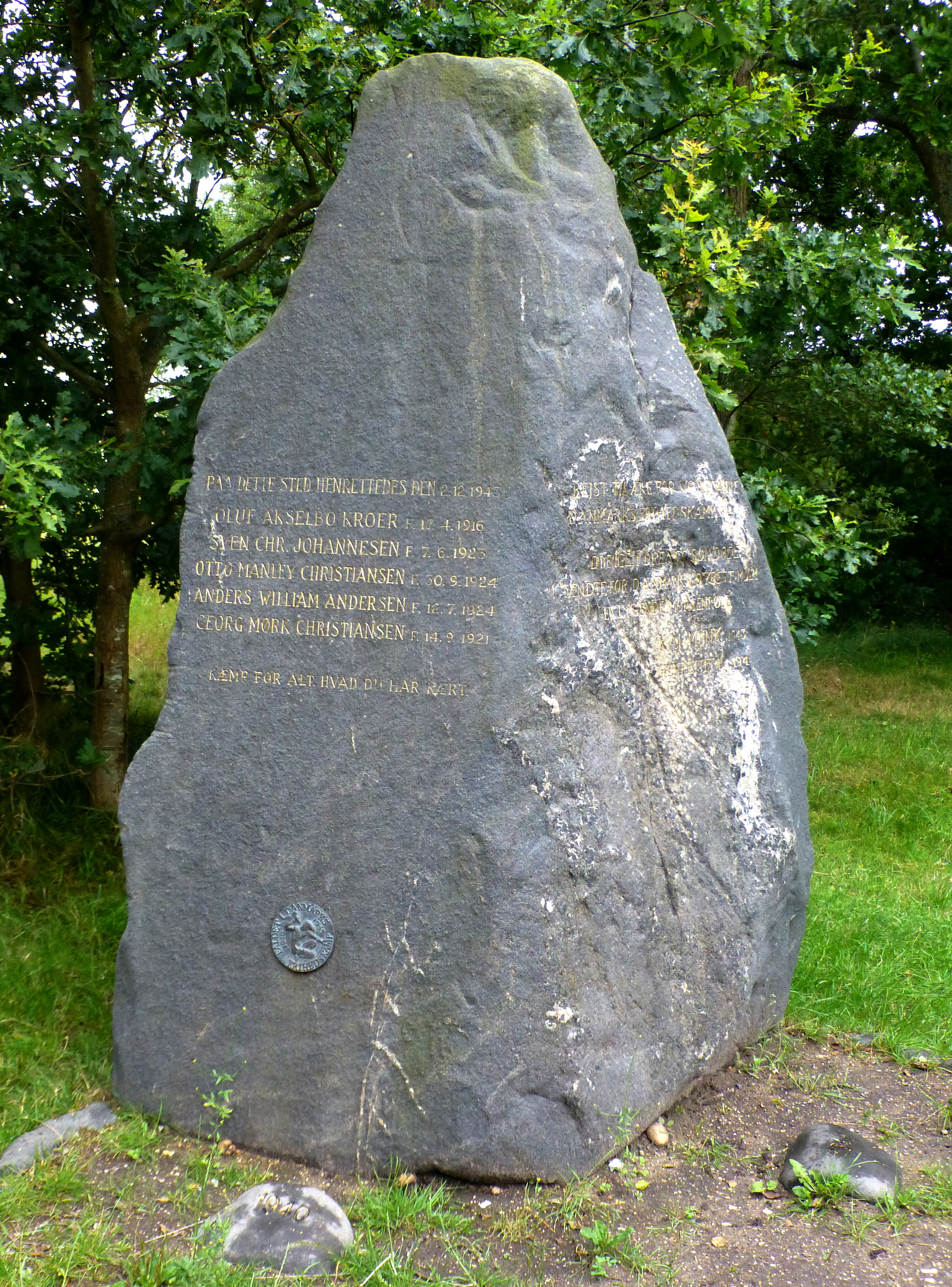
- Memorial stone at Skæring Hede
- Interactive map of Skæring Heath
- Type: Urban forest, Memorial
- Location: Aarhus, Denmark
- Coordinates: 56°14′14.6″N 10°20′04.5″E
- Area: 8.5 hectares (21 acres)
- Created: 1946
- Owner: Aarhus Municipality

Skæring Hede (Skæring Heath) or Skæring Mindelund (Skæring Memorial) is a forest and memorial park in Skæring, the northernmost suburb of Aarhus, Denmark. Skæring Hede was originally a large heath but today only a fraction of it remains as encroaching suburbs and areas with summer houses have gradually taken over much of the natural land in the area, through the 70s and 80s. The remaining area of 8.5 hectares (21 acres) are mainly forest, although some heath do remain, and is managed as a public forest park by Aarhus Municipality. Today Skæring Hede is one of only a few public forests in Skæring and the northernmost park in Aarhus. The forest is mainly mixed pine and birch forest with a number of walking paths crossing through it and it is home to a World War II memorial. Skæring Hede is well known as the place where five Danish resistance fighters were executed during the Second World War in one of the first mass executions during the war. Parking facilities on Åstrup Strandvej.

The forest has a Grejbase (Equipment base), an equipment locker which can be rented by teachers and other educators on excursions. The base in Skæring Hede is focused on marine biology due to the proximity to the coast and shallow, rocky beach. The forest today is a recreational space in Skæring and an important local landmark.

== History ==
The heath at Skæring was a relatively remote and unused area up to the 1940s when it was still some 10–15 km. outside the city. When the German army occupied Denmark it also eventually took possession of the heath and by 1943 had turned it into a shooting range. On 17 November 1943 the Danish resistance blew up 3 bridges at Langå, severing the railroad between Aarhus and Randers. The resistance group was commanded by Kai Hannibal Hoff and consisted of Jørgen Røjel, Ejvind Jacobsen, Ole Hovedskov, Sven Johannesen and Oluf Kroer. The operation was a success, for a month German rail-borne troop transports from Norway had to be stopped or redirected.

However, the Gestapo quickly started tracking down the resistance members and 4 men from Randers were arrested while Jørgen Røjel and Ejvind Jacobsen managed to escape and eventually made it to neutral Sweden. Kai Hannibal Hoff, the leader of the operation, was arrested on 30 November and moved to Randers Barracks where he was killed trying to escape. Seven people were arrested in all, 5 were sentenced to death and two were given life in prison. On 2 December 1943 early in the morning in Skæring Hede, the five death sentences were carried out by shooting. The bodies of the five executed men and the body of another resistance fighter were subsequently buried in secret at Husbjerg Klit, a remote military training ground in south-west Jutland.

The memorial on Skæring Hede has a connection to another Danish World War II memorial in Allerstrupgård Skov. It is located at the meadow codenamed "Mustard Point" where the Hvidsten Group received supplies from the Allies during the war. The 8 members of the group were arrested March 1944 and executed 9 June 1944 in Ryvangen. After the war the bodies were exhumed and brought back to the village Hvidsten where the "Mustard Point" meadow was donated by the town as a cemetery and memorial which was inaugurated 18 July 1945. It was the Hvidsten Group that supplied the explosives that made it possible to bomb the Langå bridges.

== Memorial ==
The memorial is in a clearing close to the water and in view of the Bay of Aarhus and Helgenæs. The main component is a massive granite boulder with text inscriptions listing the men who were executed there and a short poem by Kaj Munk. The memorial is dedicated to the five men who were executed there and Kaj Munk. In addition there is one oak tree which was planted for each of the five men killed there.

=== Executed resistance fighters ===
- Anders W. Andersen (from Randers 12 July 1924)
- Georg Mørch Christiansen (from Vejle 14 September 1921)
- Otto Manley Christiansen (from Randers 30 September 1924)
- Sven Christian Johannesen (from Odense 10 June 1923)
- Oluf Kroer|Oluf Akselbo Kroer (from Randers 17 April 1916)
