= Åparken =

Park in Aarhus, Denmark

Coordinates: 56.155646°N 10.194369°E

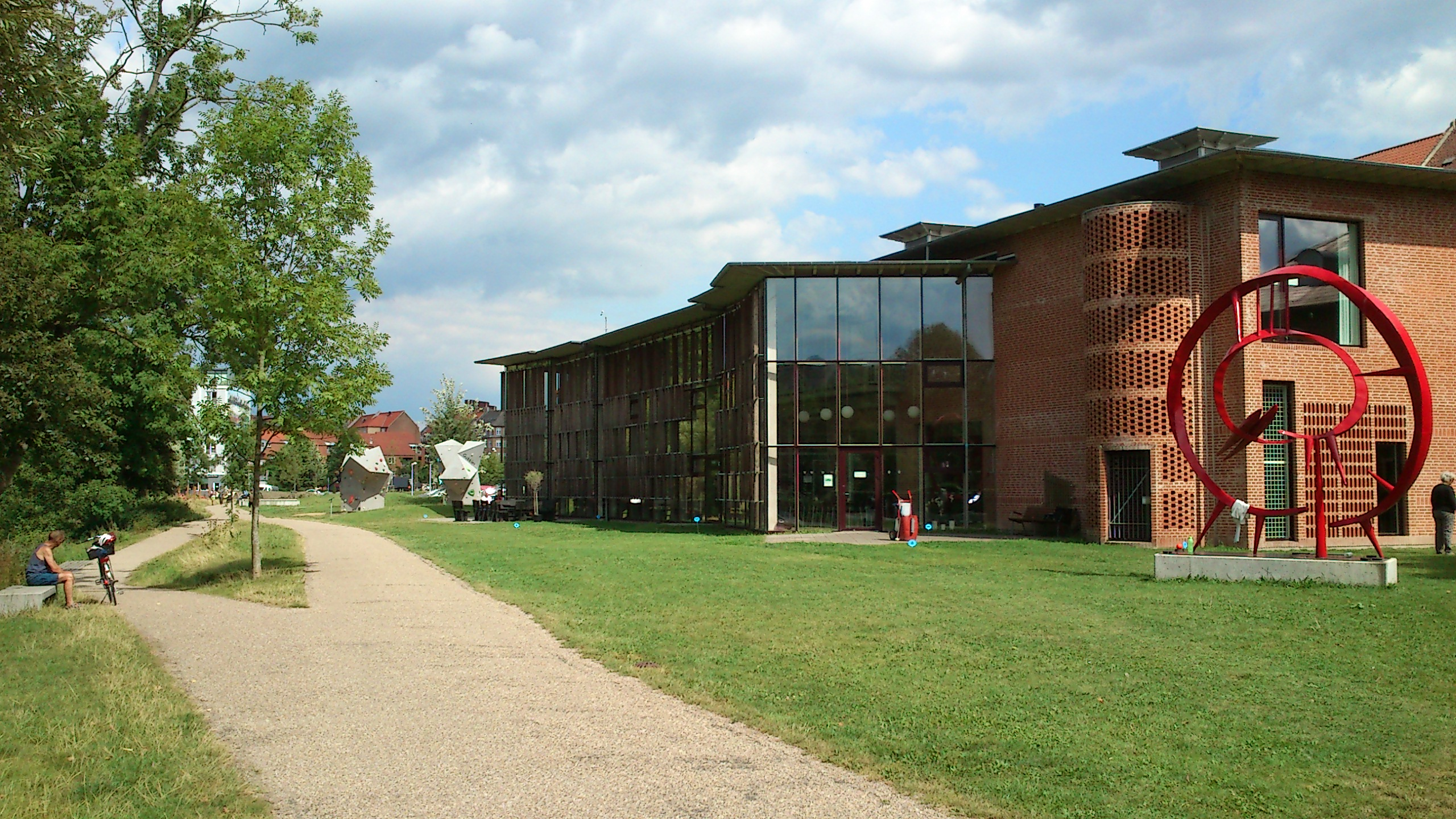
- Åparken and Folkestedet community house
- Interactive map of Åparken
- Type: Urban park
- Location: Aarhus, Denmark
- Created: 2008
- Owner: Aarhus Municipality

Åparken (The River-park) is a public park in central Aarhus, Denmark. The park is situated by the Aarhus River in the Vesterbro neighborhood in Midtbyen close to CeresByen, bounded by the streets Carls Blochs Gade and Thorvaldsensgade. The park is divided by a central pedestrian pathway which runs from the urban center and connects to the recreational path Brabrandstien towards the west, circumventing Brabrand Lake area. Åparken is the first of a number of green areas extending from the city centre along the river and the pathway of Brabrandstien. The long distance "Aarhus-Silkeborg hiking route" starts off from Åparken.

The park is an open grassy area with a few trees and raised flower beds of mixed wildflower. The park contains a number of recreational and play facilities, including a slack lining, hammocks, climbing walls and a berth for canoes, kayaks or general recreation has been constructed at the river. The park is also home to Folkestedet, a municipal community house and organization, aiming to provide facilities for clubs and organizations in the city. Aarhus Tech runs a café here.

The park was developed partially on top of an underground municipal water reservoir, constructed in 2008-2011. The basin is part of a series of underground reservoirs and a larger effort by the municipality to deal with the increased and increasing levels of rainfall due to climate change. The reservoir can hold 15,000 m3 of water from the river.

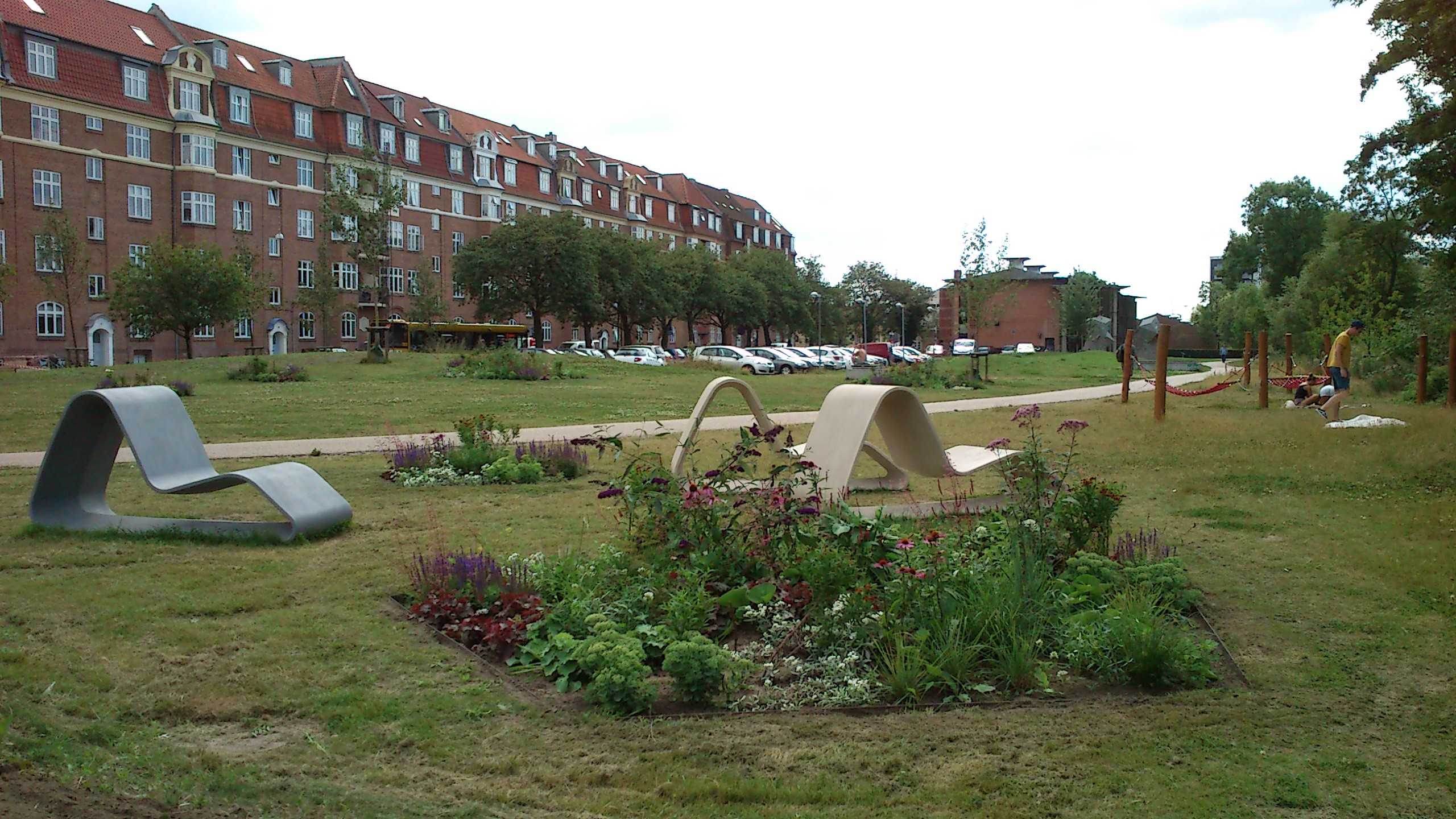

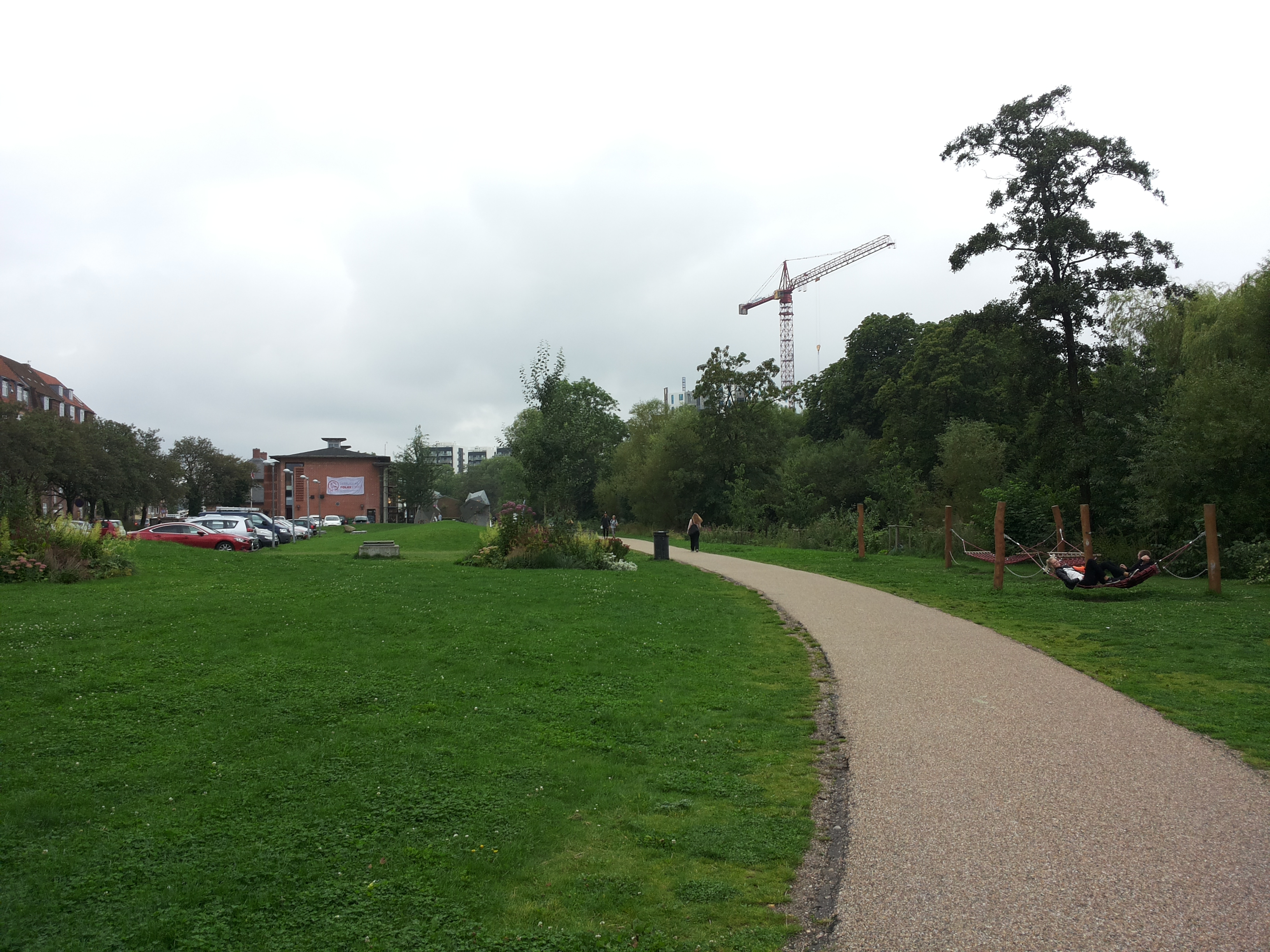

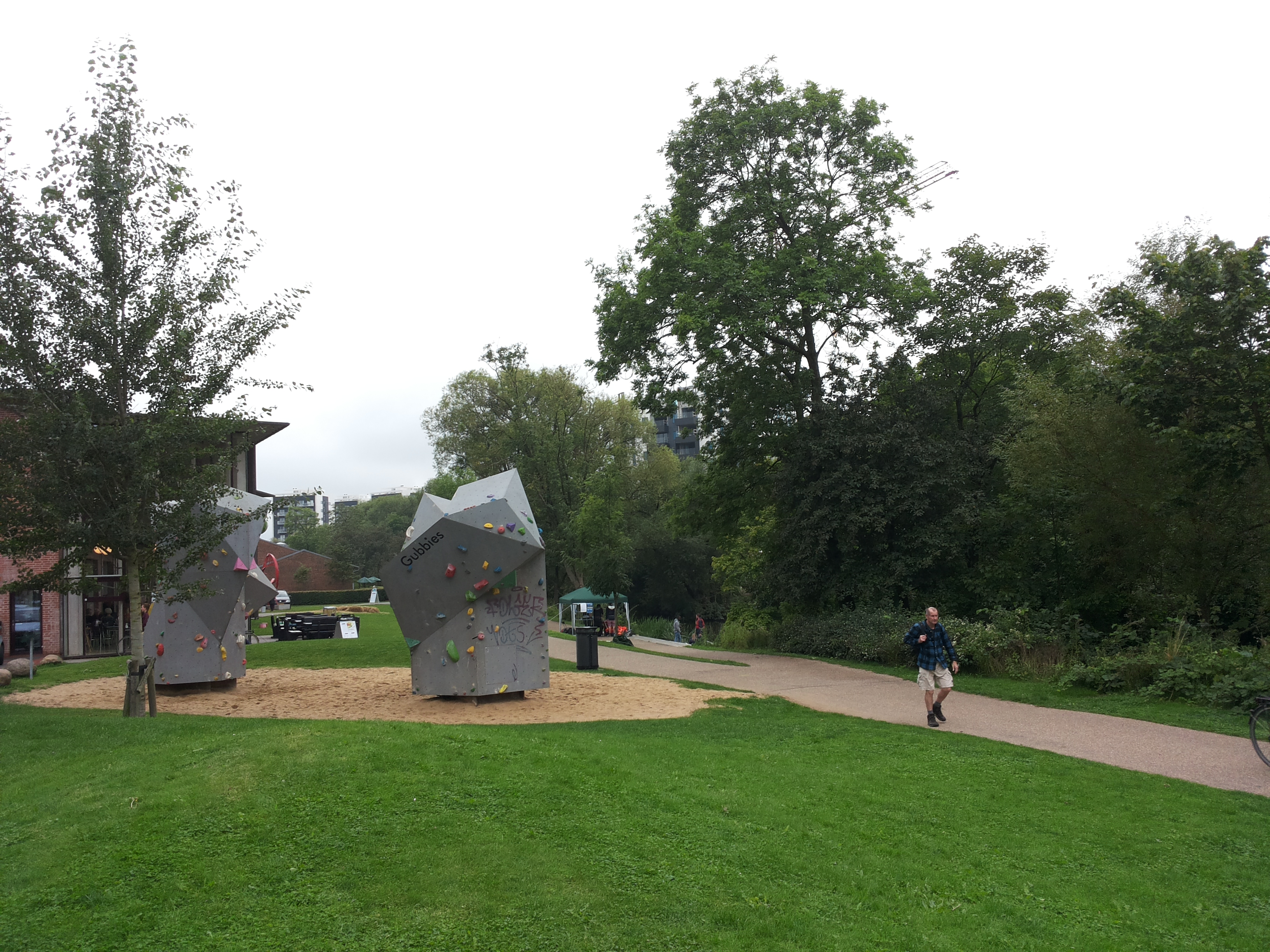

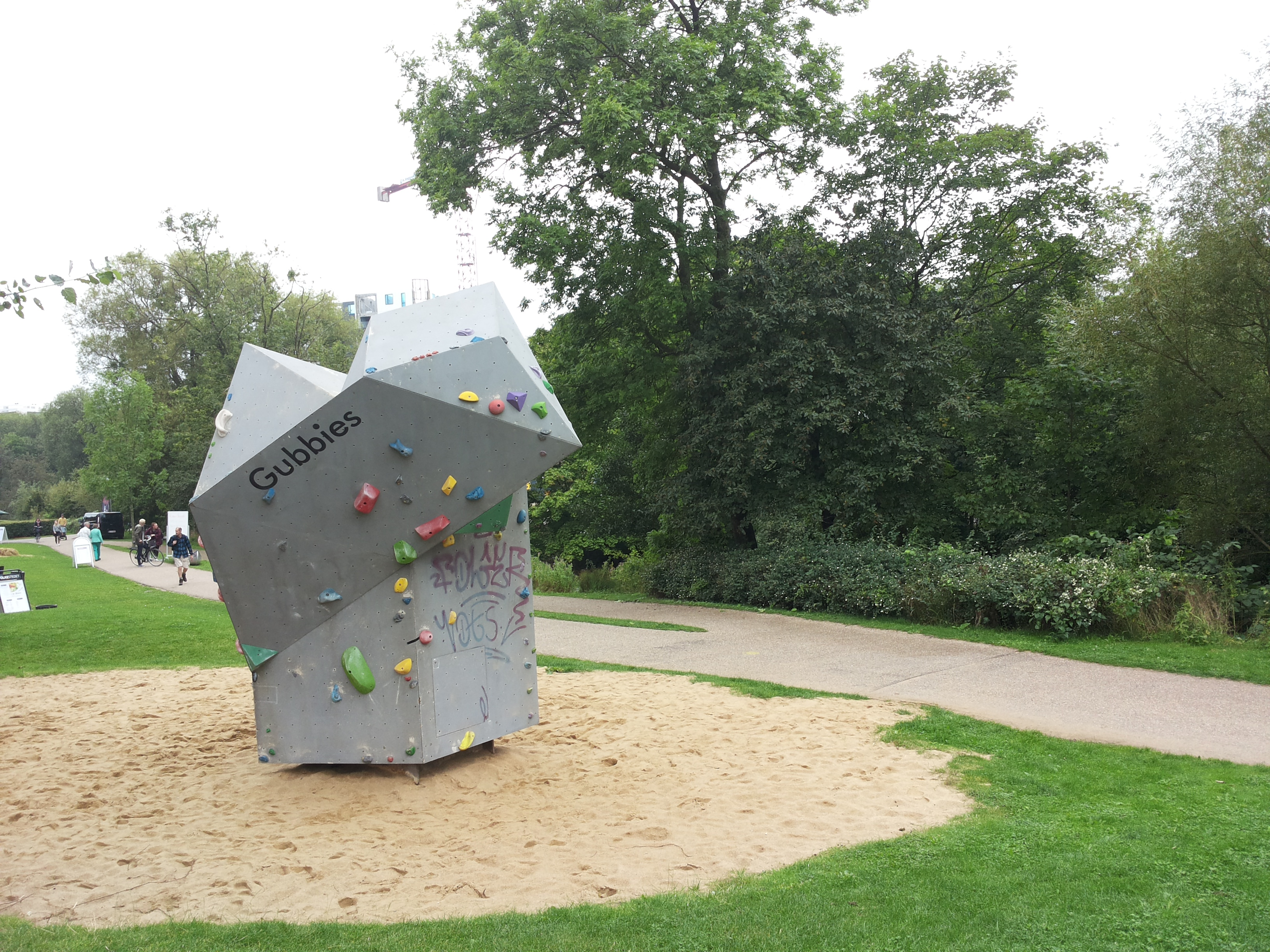
Climbing

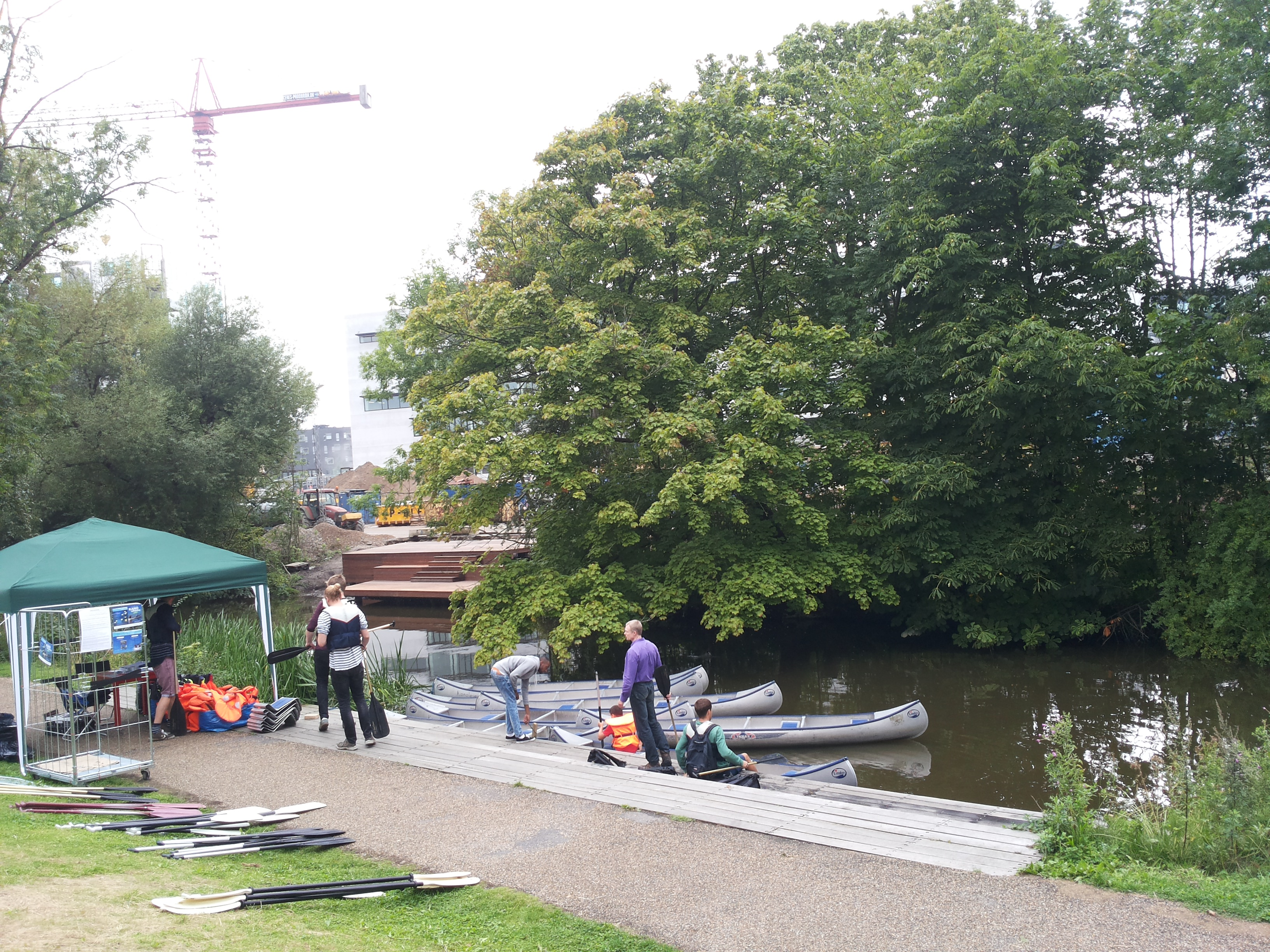
The berth

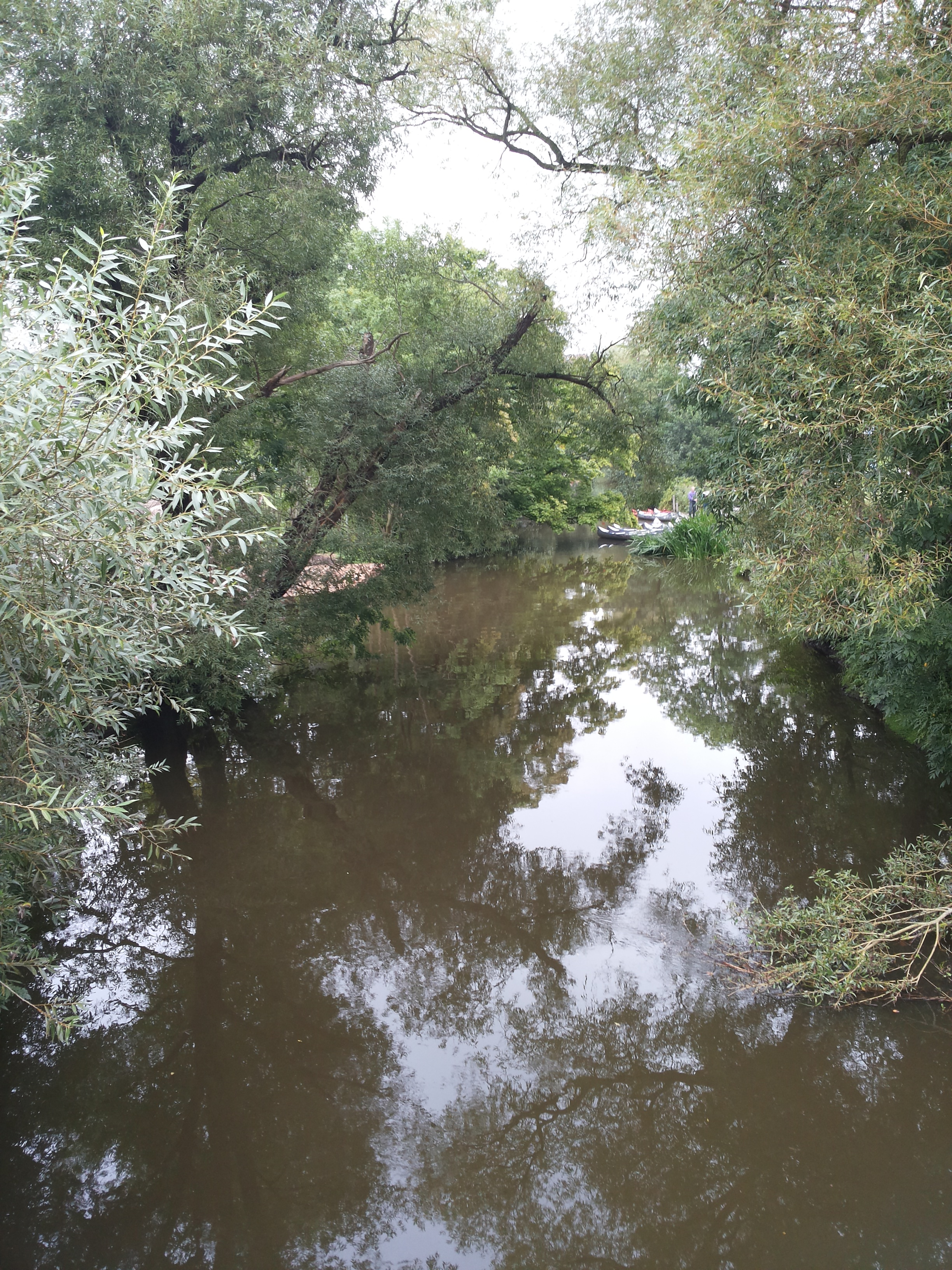

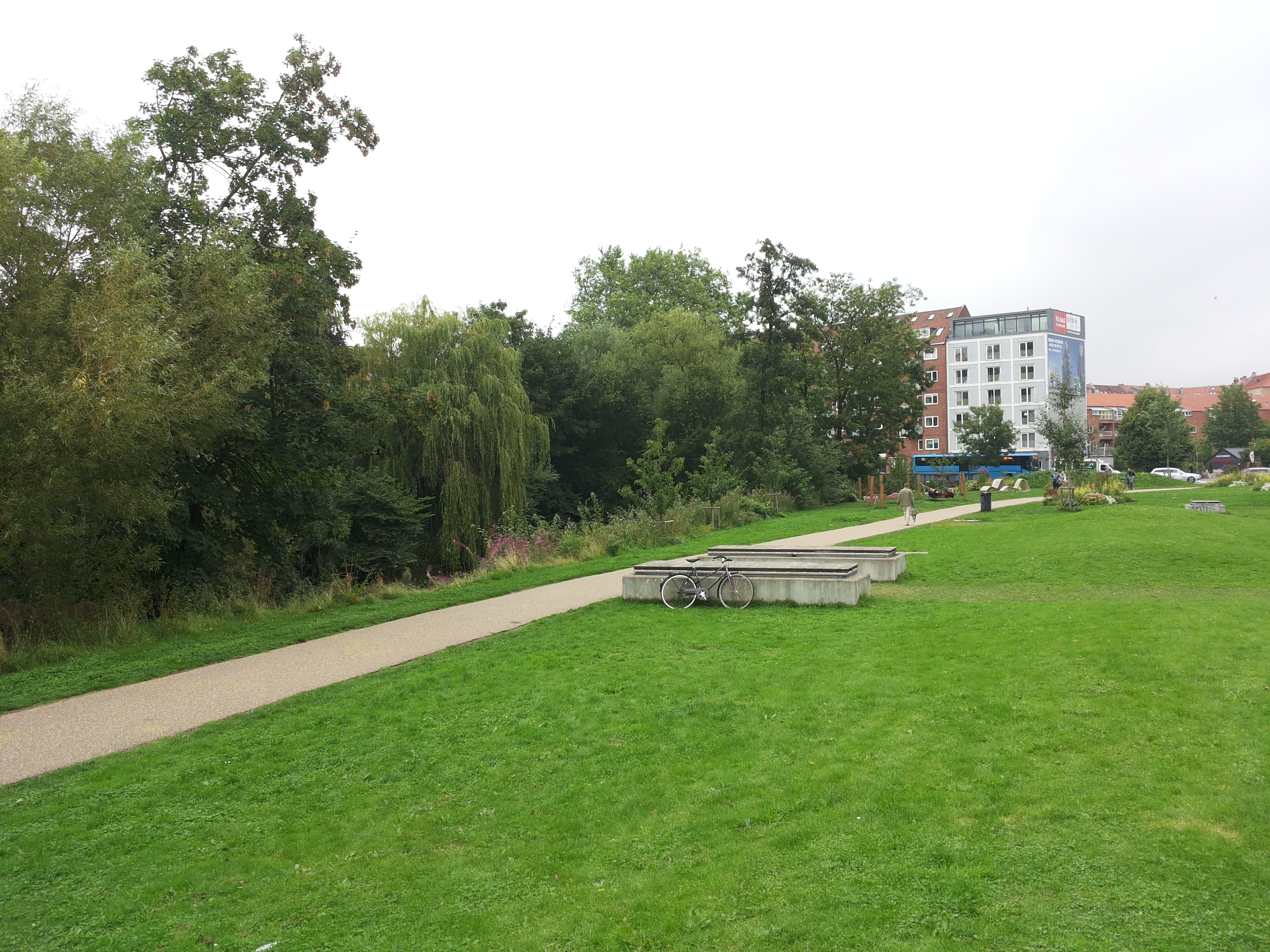

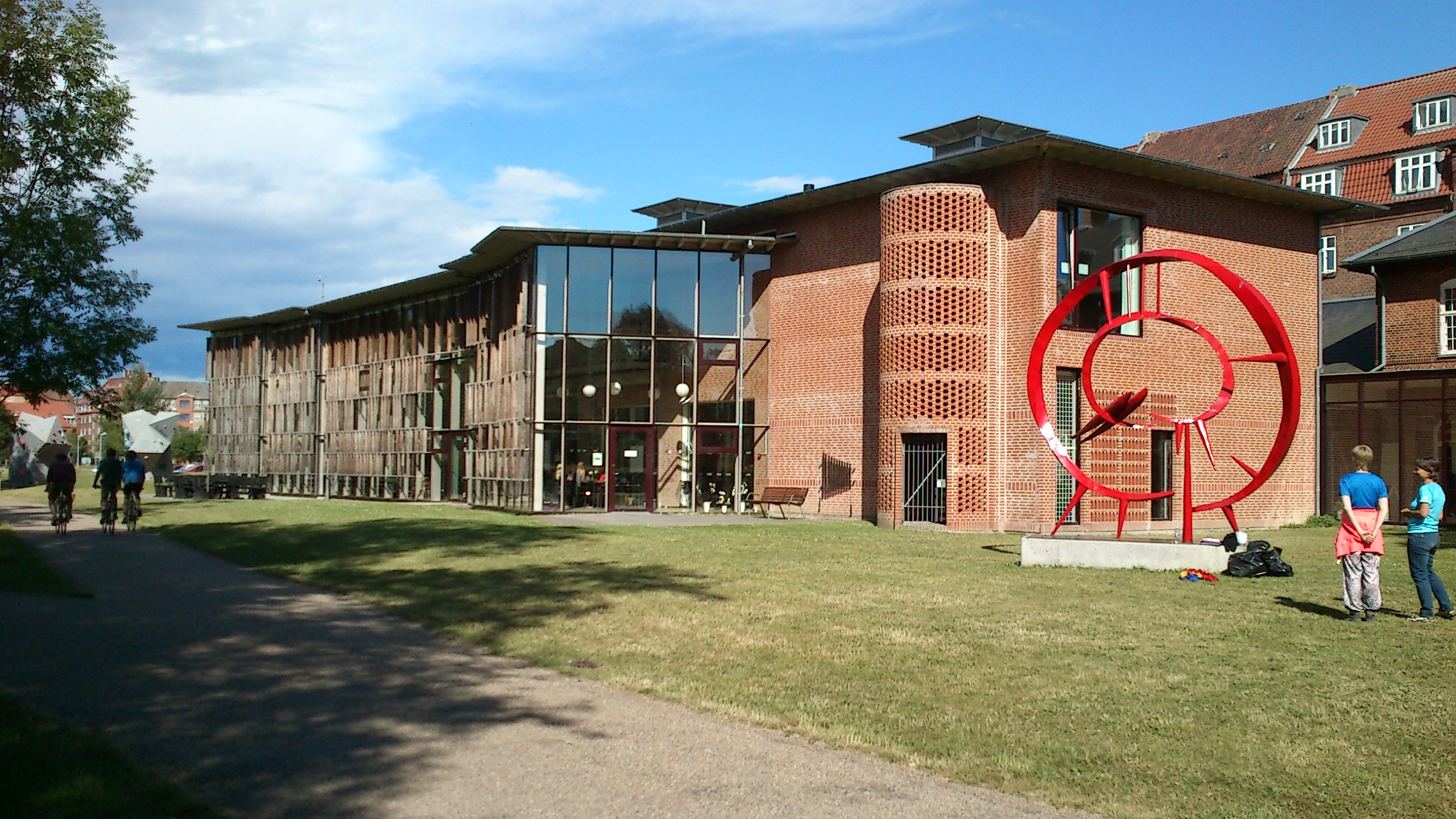
Folkestedet
