= Langenæs Park =

Park in Aarhus, Denmark

Coordinates: 56.1433°N 10.1814°E

- Langenæs Parken
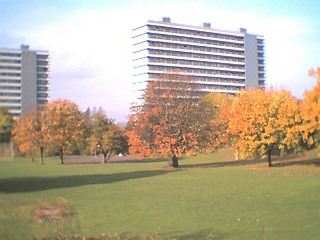
- Fall in Langenæs Park
- Interactive map of Langenæs Park
- Type: Urban park
- Location: Aarhus, Denmark
- Area: 4.5 hectares (11 acres)
- Created: 1970s
- Owner: Aarhus Municipality
- Operator: Aarhus Municipality

Langenæs Park (Danish: Langenæs Parken) is a public park in the Langenæs neighborhood in the Aarhus C district in Aarhus, Denmark. The park is situated west of the Frederiksbjerg neighborhood along the curved street Langenæs Allé to the south and the AArhus rail yard to the north. Langenæs Park is one of the largest parks in Aarhus and is composed of mainly landscaped lawns with trees scattered throughout along with a large section dedicated to sports. Facilities include soccer fields, a disc gold field, picnic areas and a paved running track. Langenæs Park was established in connection with the development of the Langenæs neighborhood in the 1970s and is today the primary recreational spot in the area along with Frederiksbjerg Bypark to the west and the Rehabilitation PArk to the south. The park is owned by Aarhus Municipality and is managed by the municipal department Natur og Miljø (English: Nature and Environment) and can be rented for public events.

Langenæs Park is home to the disc golf club 'Aarhus Disc Golf Club' which maintains a 4-hole course in the park. The sports club 'Aarhus 1900' has a club house in the park as well and uses the soccer fields as training facilities.

== Gallery ==
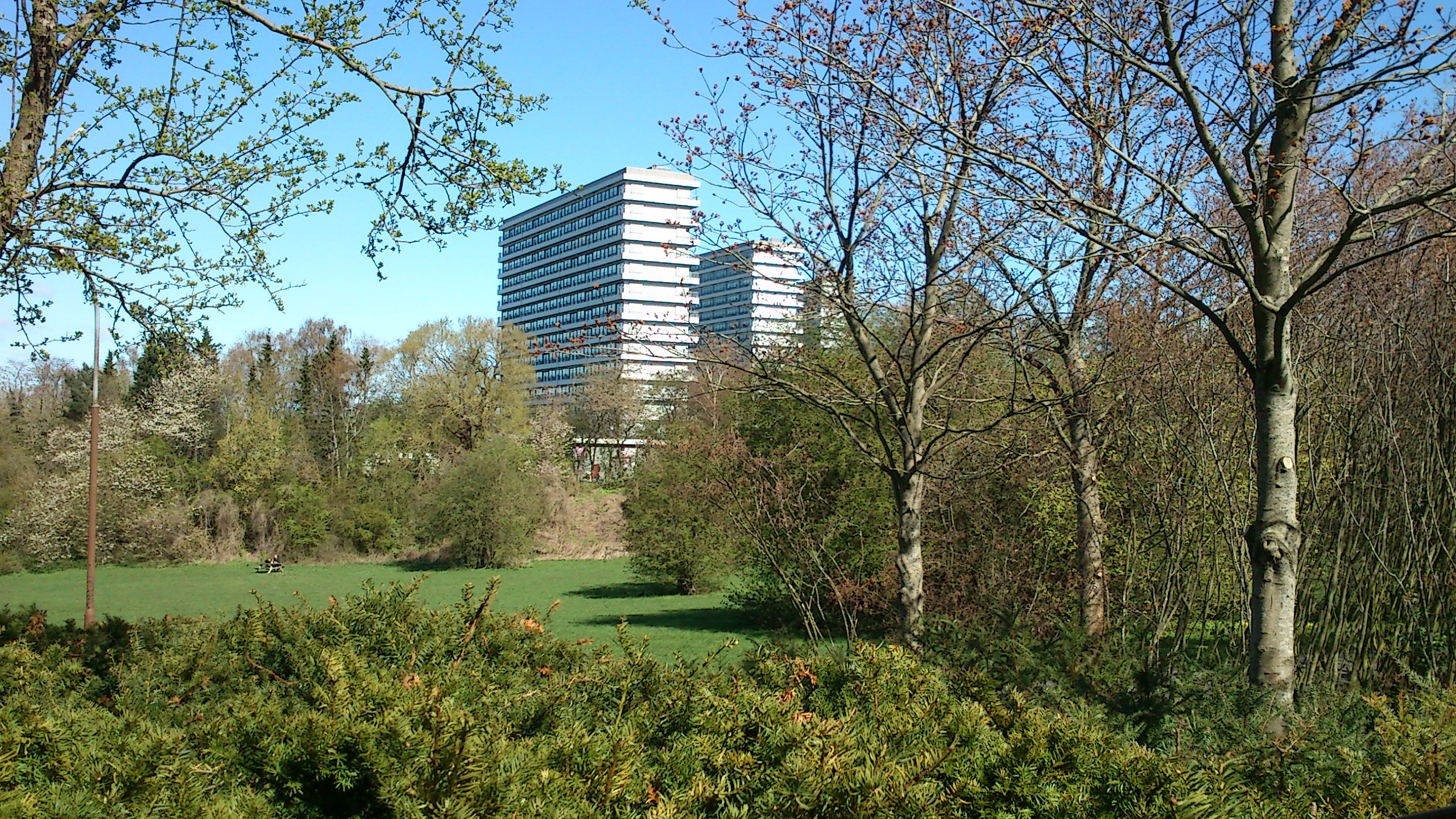

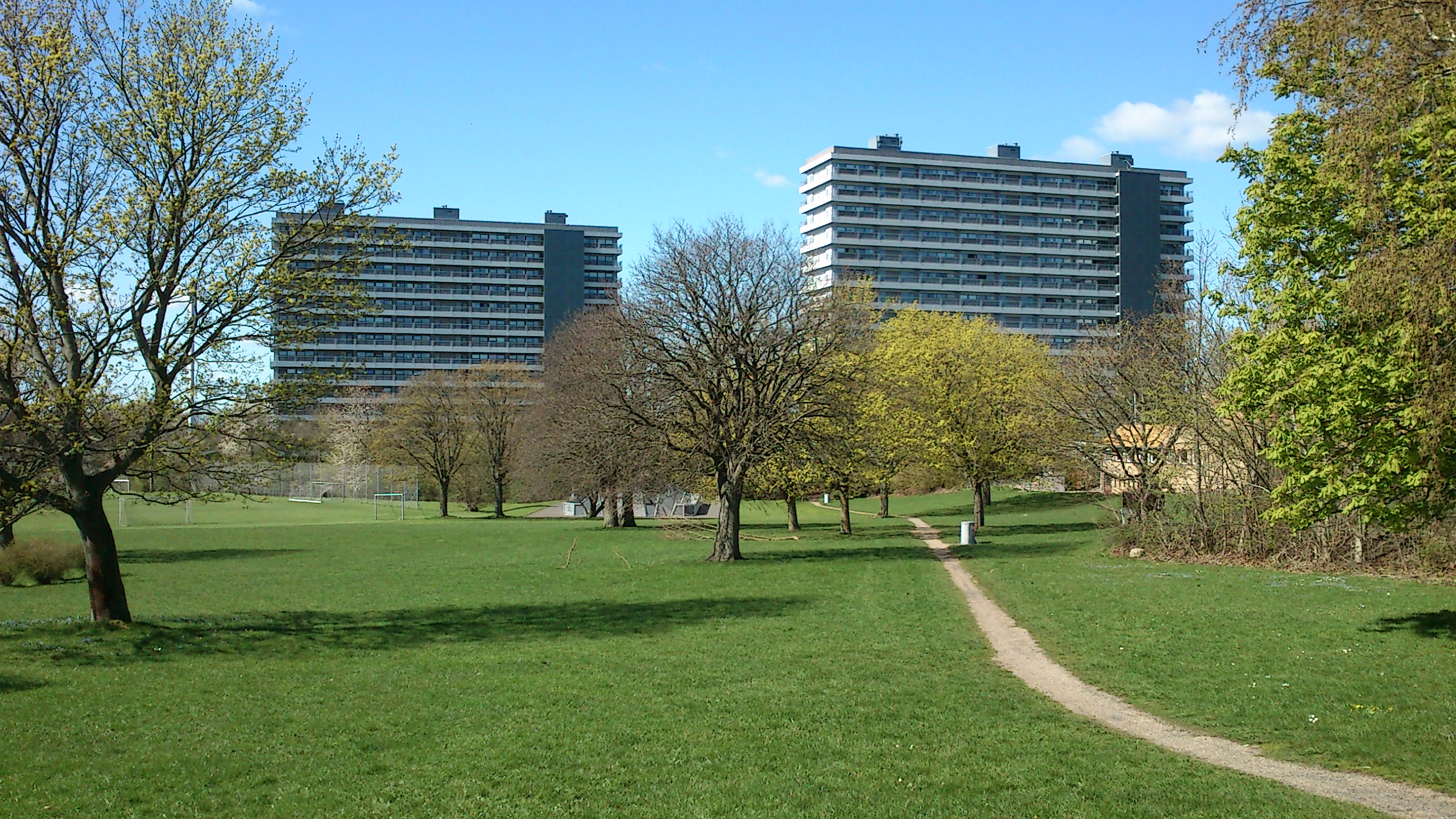

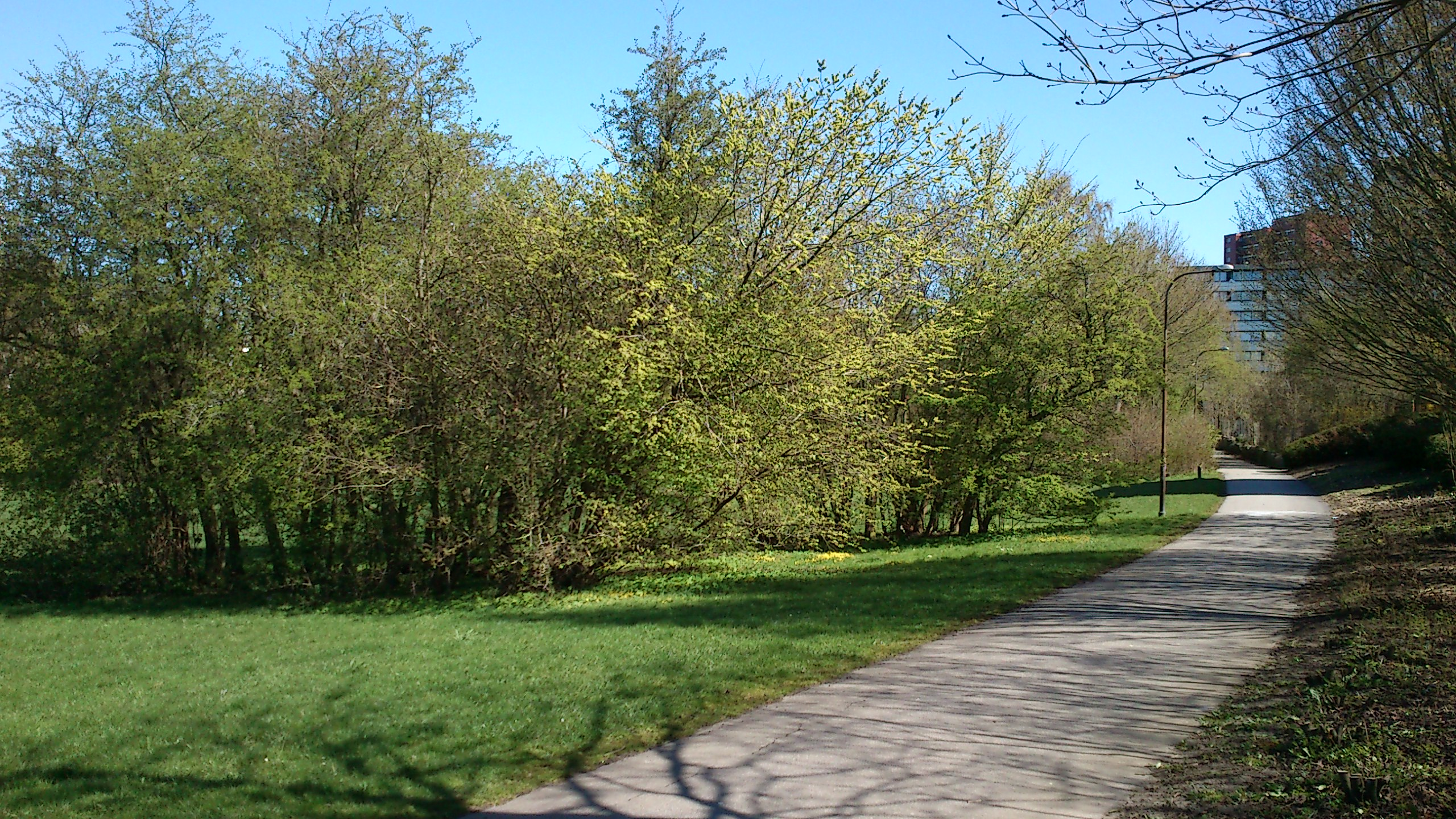

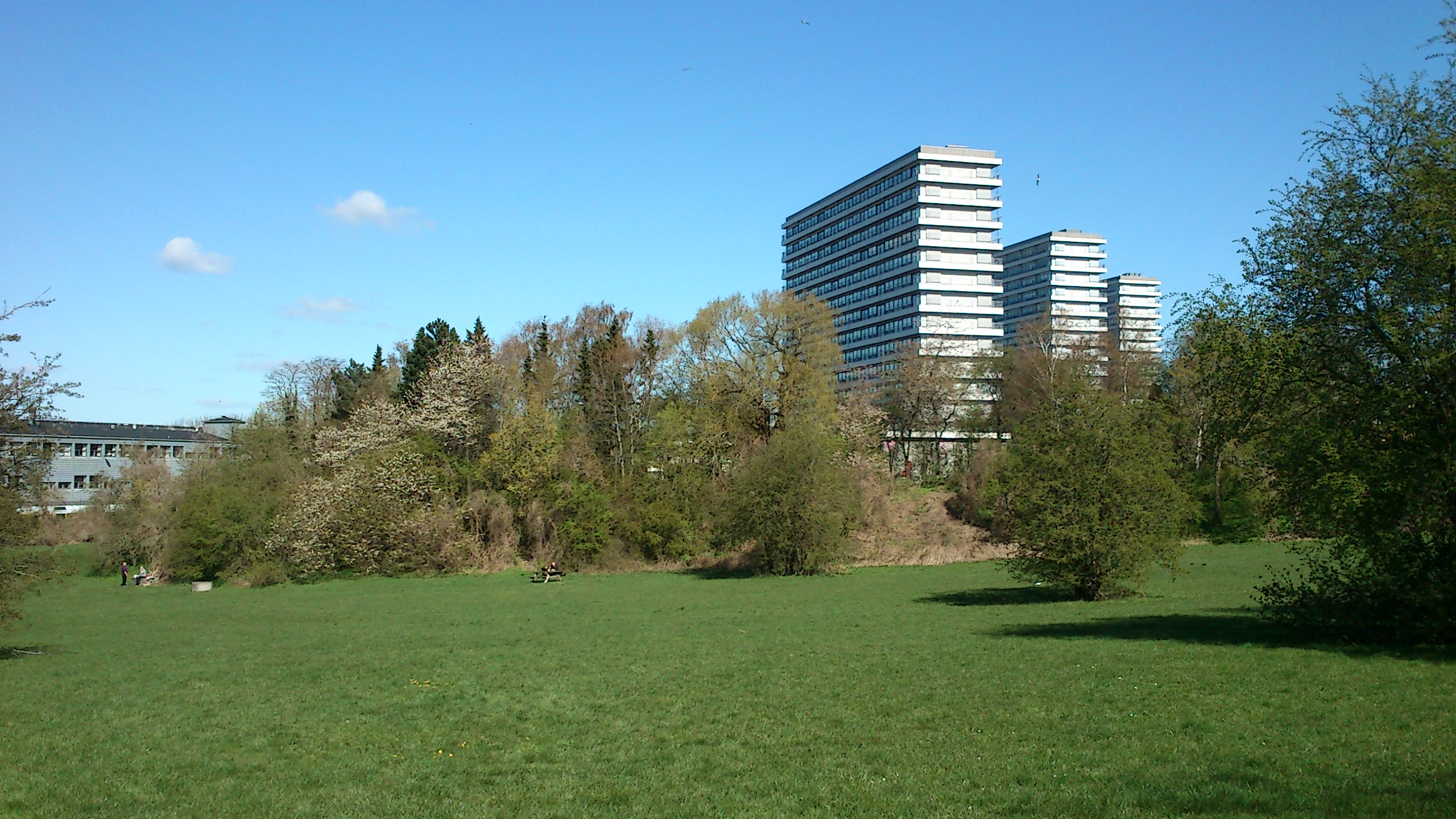

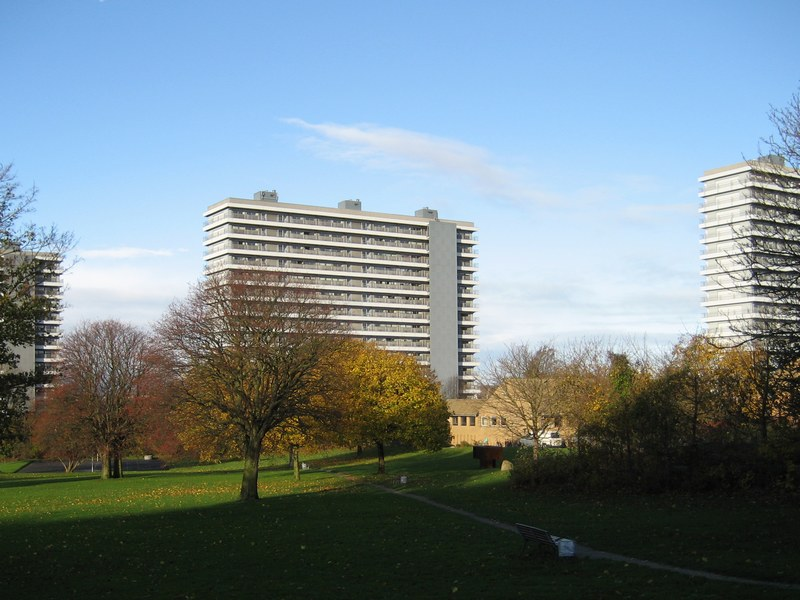
