= Mindeparken =

Coordinates: 56°7′46″N 10°12′26″E

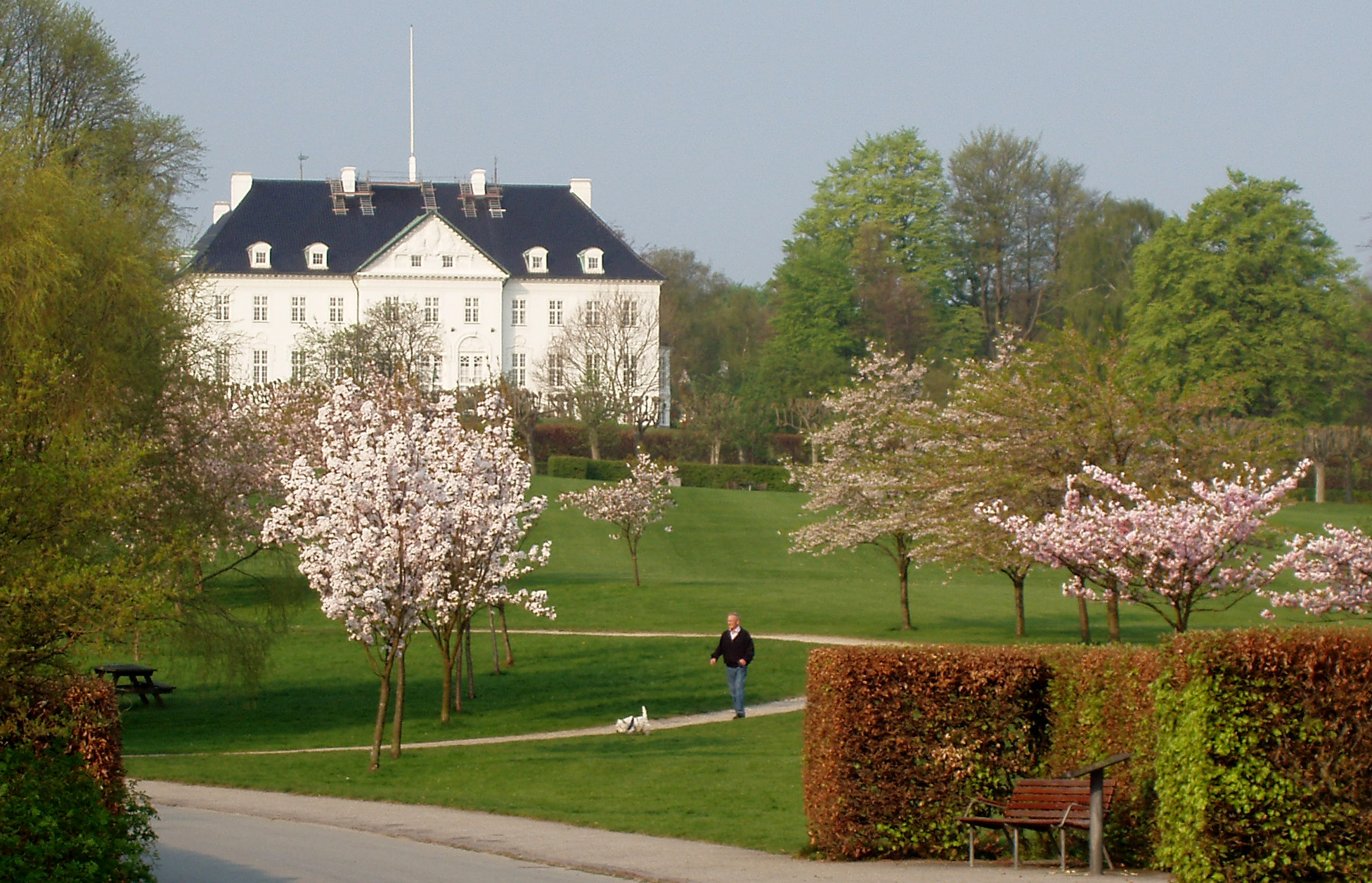
Mindeparken with Marselisborg Palace in the background.

Mindeparken (English: The Memorial Park) is a memorial park and recreational area in the south of Aarhus City, next to Marselisborg Palace.

== History ==
The Park itself, was inaugurated in 1925 by king Christian X and originally designed to accommodate larger gatherings of visiting Danish citizens living abroad. That role soon diminished and disappeared, as the annual gatherings in Rebild gained momentum.

In 1934 a large monument in limestone, engraved with the names of and commemorating the 4,140 Danes killed in World War I, was erected. Designed by the Danish architect Axel Ekberg and Danish sculptor Axel Poulsen, they choose limestone from Euville in the Meuse department of France, a major battlefield in World War I. The memorial site is still in active use today and on 11 November, an annual ceremony is held here in memory of the dead.

In 2012, a stone for Danish soldiers stationed abroad, was erected in the park.

== Layout ==
Surrounding the memorial monument is a large park and lawn area, used for all kinds of gatherings, events and recreational activities by the citizens of Aarhus. The park offers a panoramic view across the Bay of Aarhus. Mindeparken was extended in 1939 and again in 1944, and now includes different sections with their own peculiarities. In a corner of the park is Træsamlingen (The Tree Collection), a botanical selection of different tree species and nearby is Rømerhaven (The Rømer Garden), a sculpture and flower garden with a botanical bend.

In the south of Mindeparken lies the Donbæk Houses, built in 1828 and 1850. They formerly served as residentials of the servants to the baron of Marselisborg Manor, and also housing for forest workers in the Marselisborg Forests at some point. The old Marselisborg Manor was located where Marselisborg Gymnasium has residence now, but caught fire several times in the early 1900s and does not exist anymore. The Donbæk Houses are thus not related to the Marselisborg Palace, a common misconception.

== Gallery ==
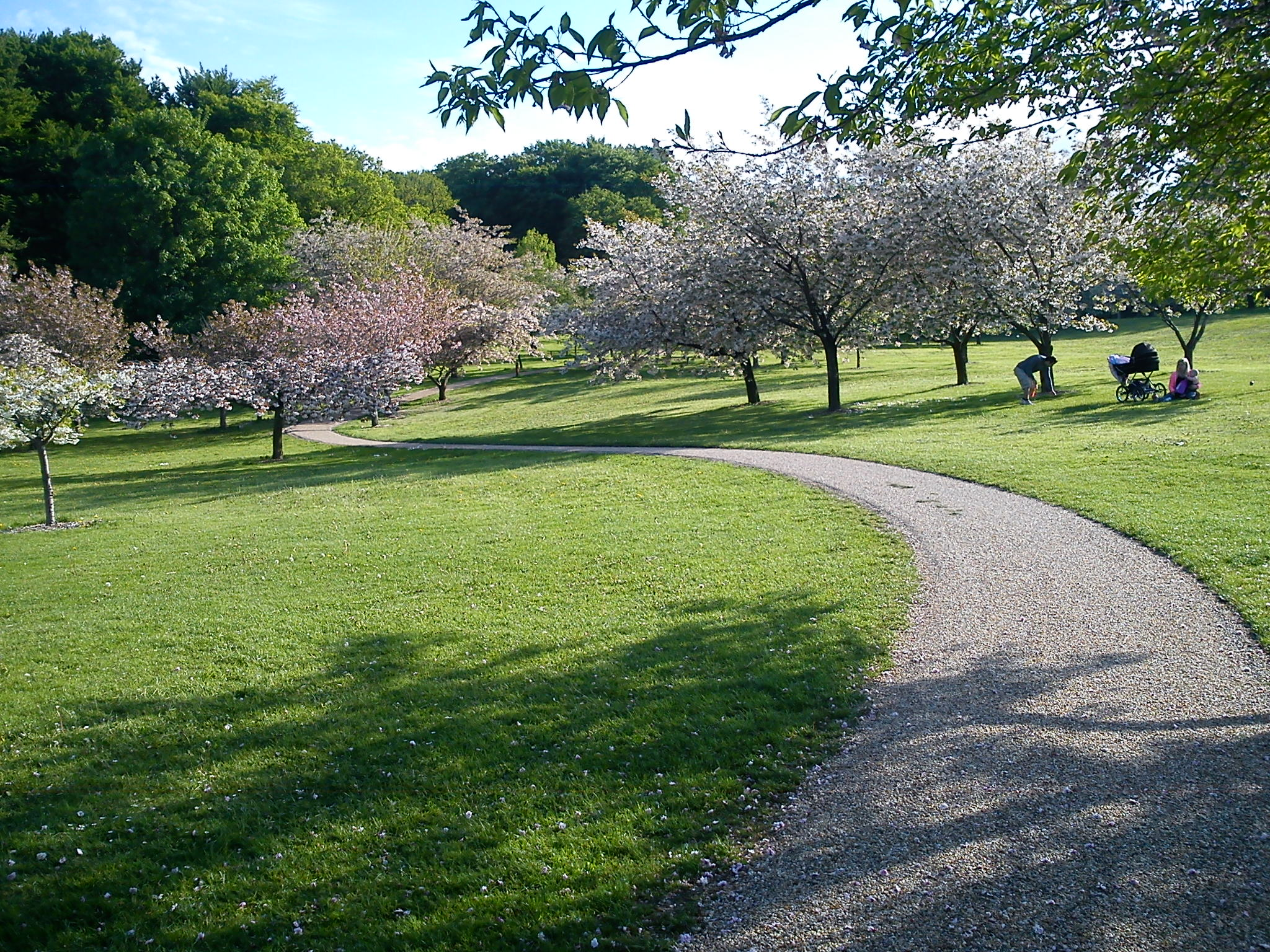
Spring scene from the Japanese cherry grove.

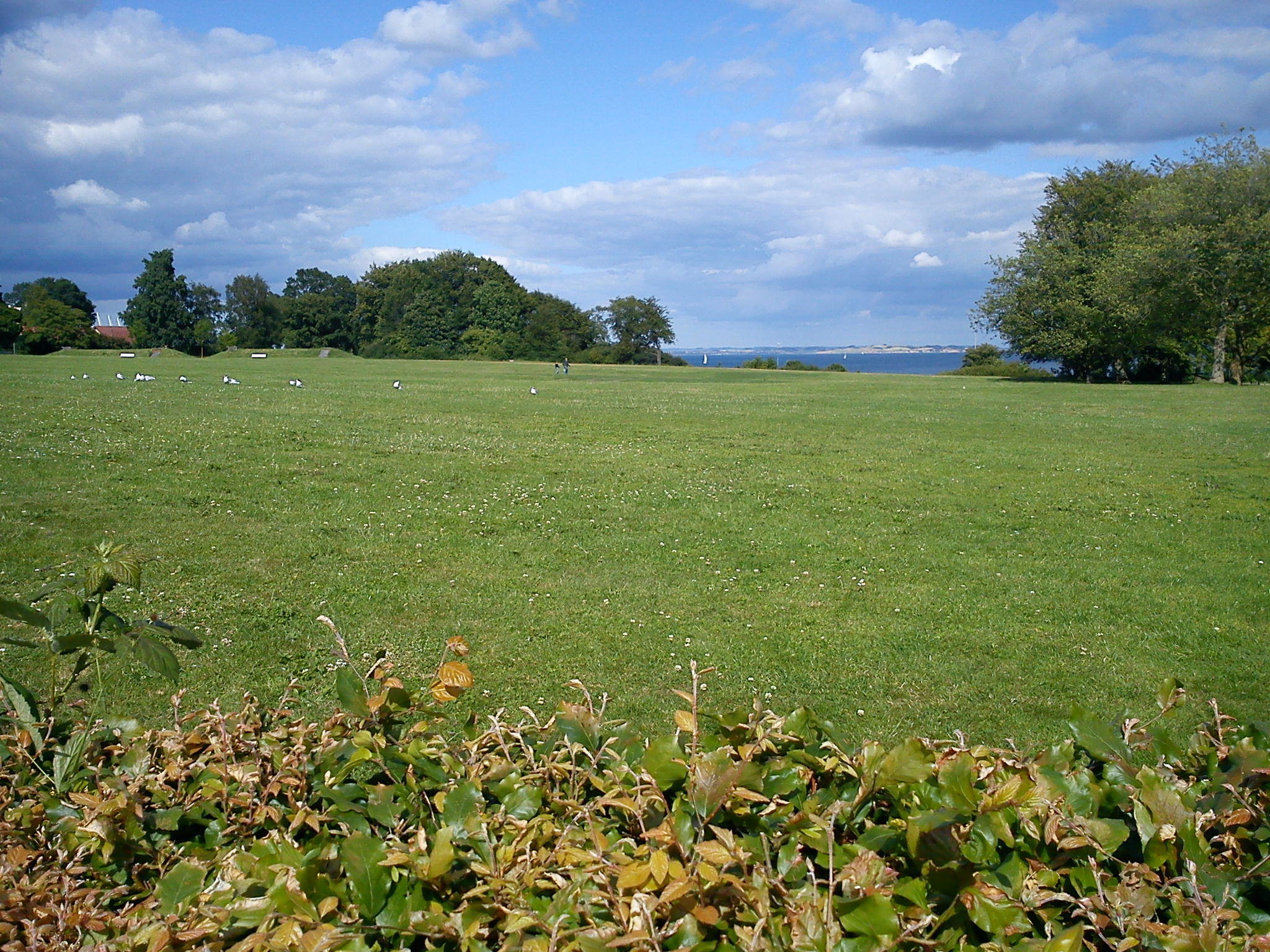
The lawn in July, with a view across the Aarhus Bay.

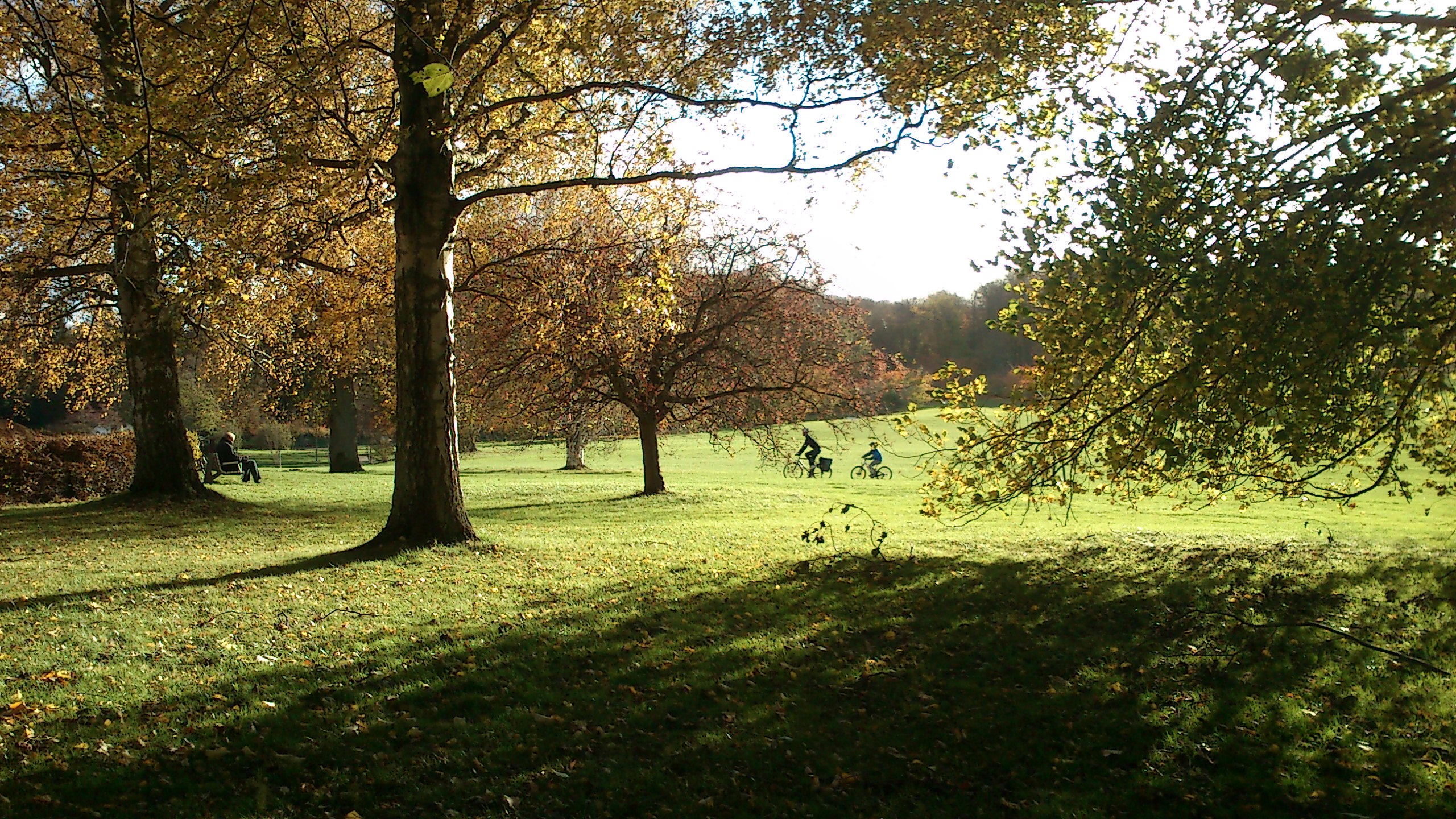
Autumn scene

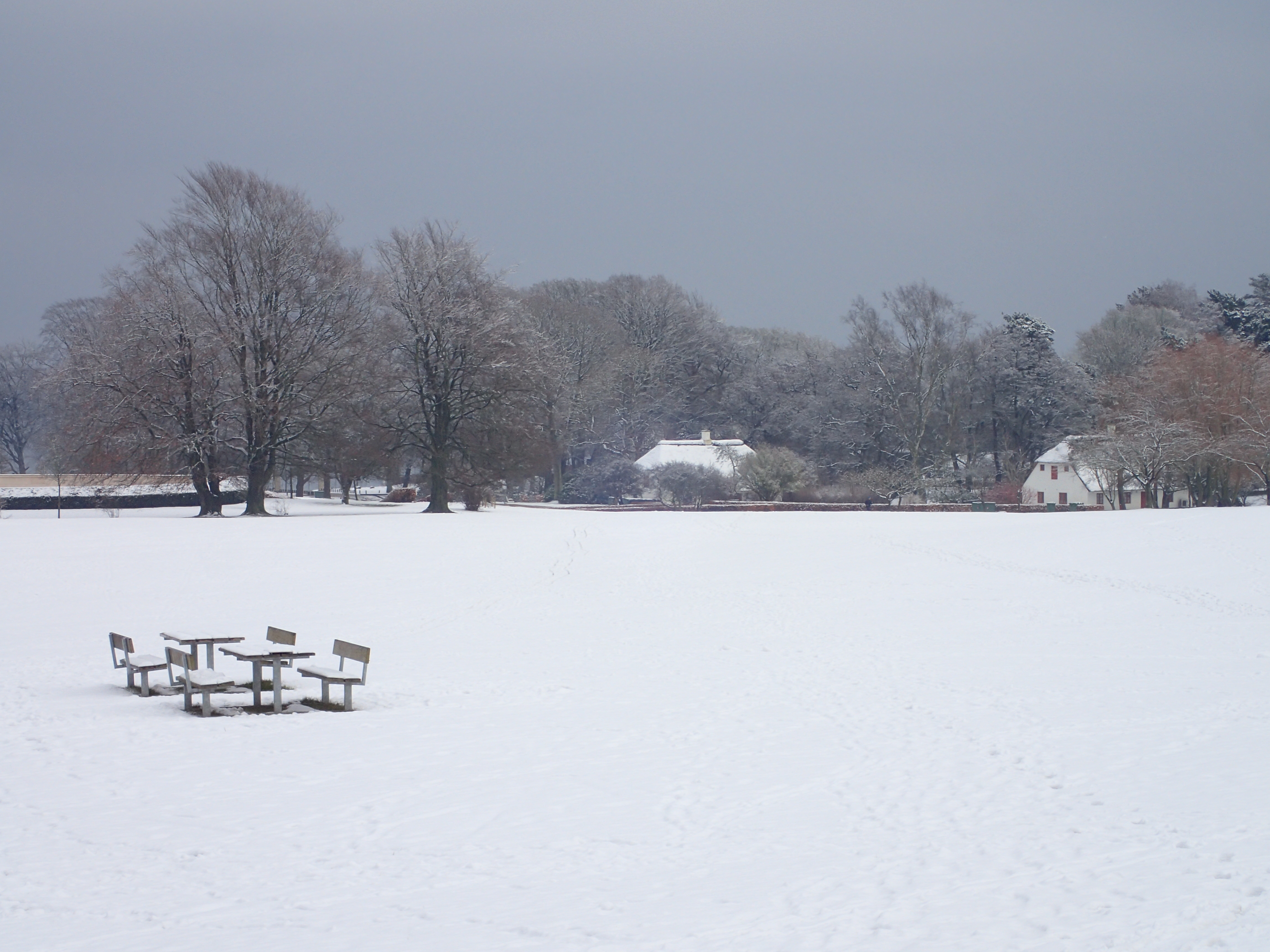
Winter scene
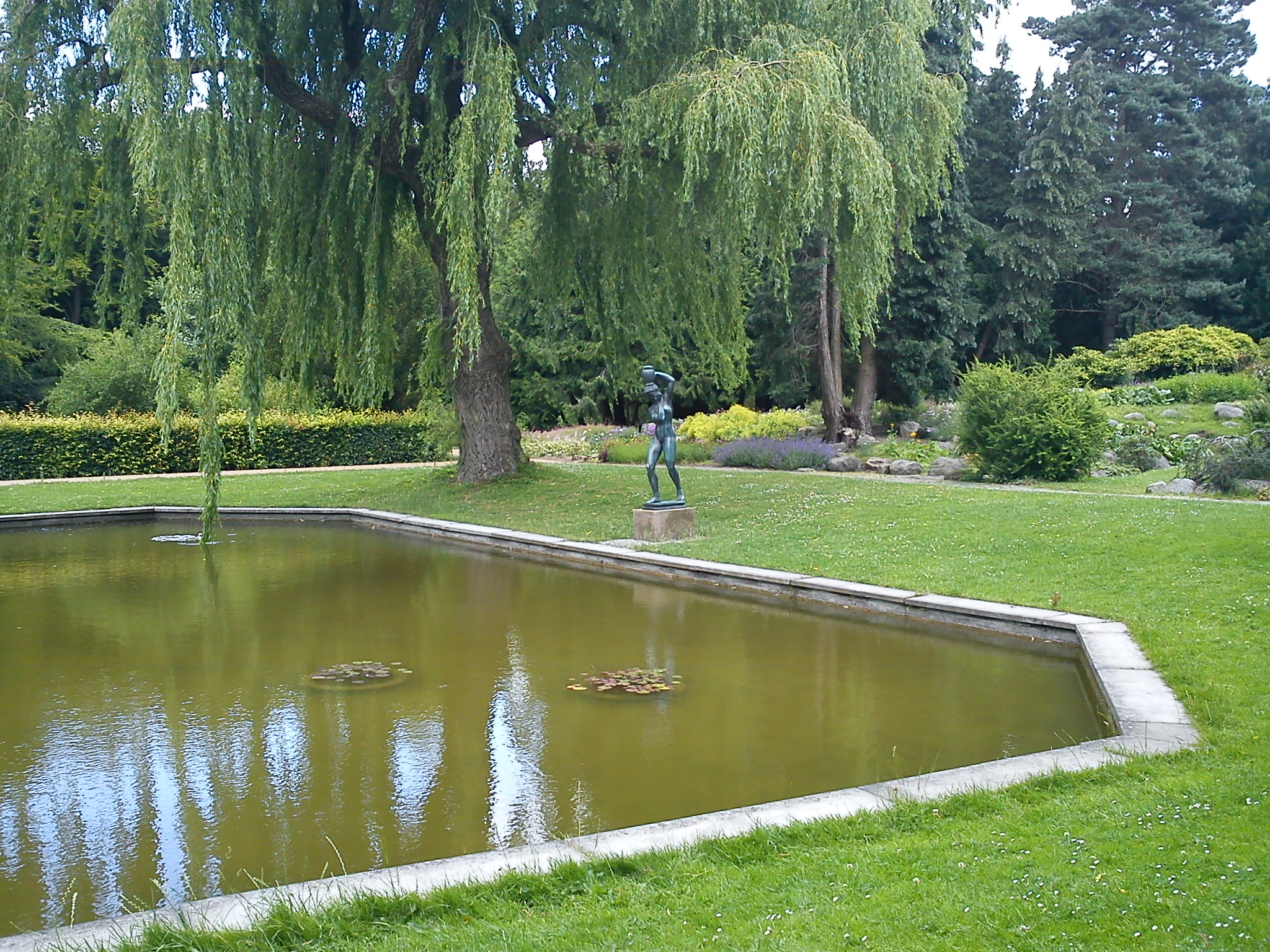
Rømerhaven. The bronze sculpture Danaiden and a mirror-pond.

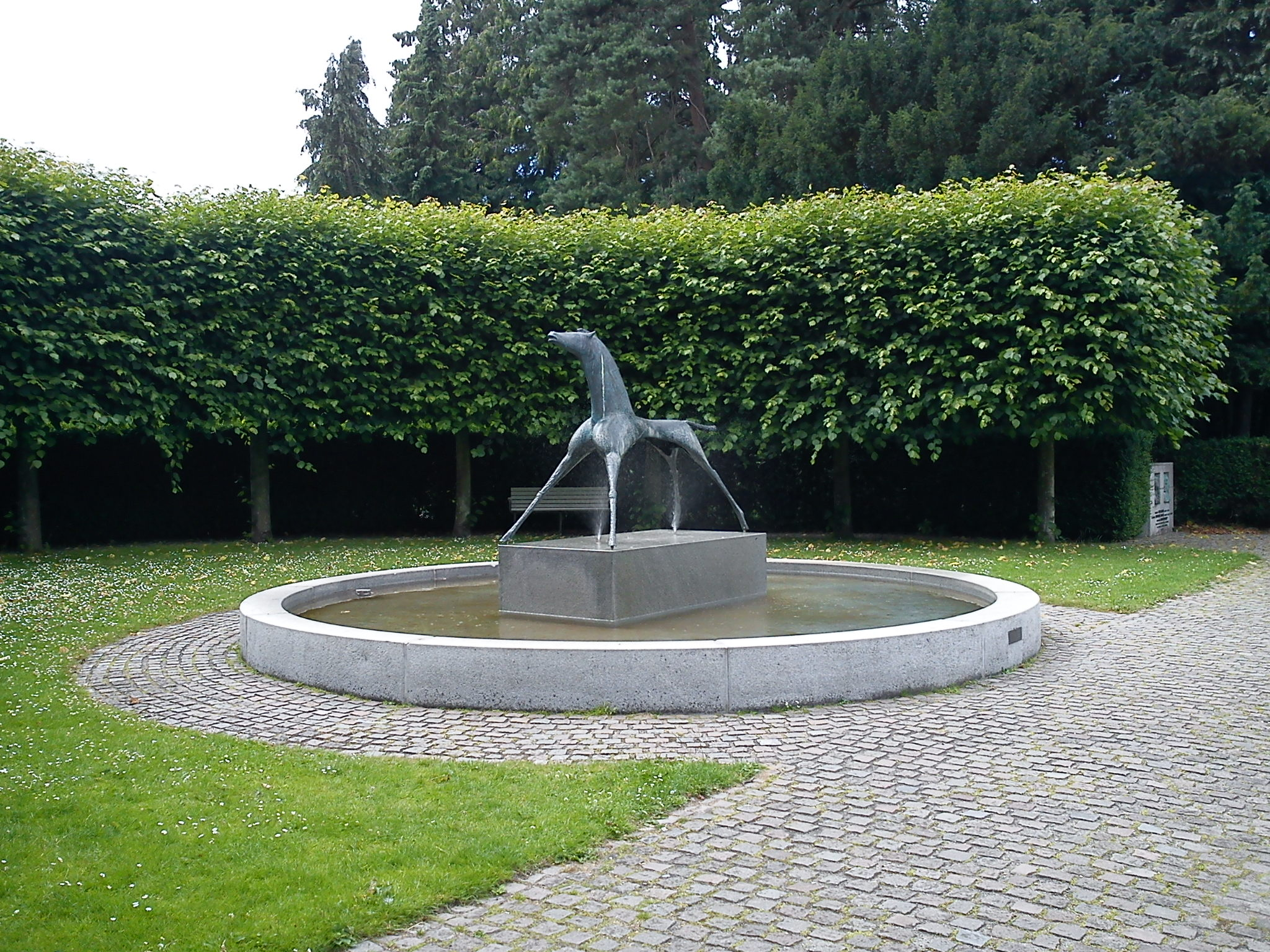
Rømerhaven. The bronze- and water-sculpture Solhesten.

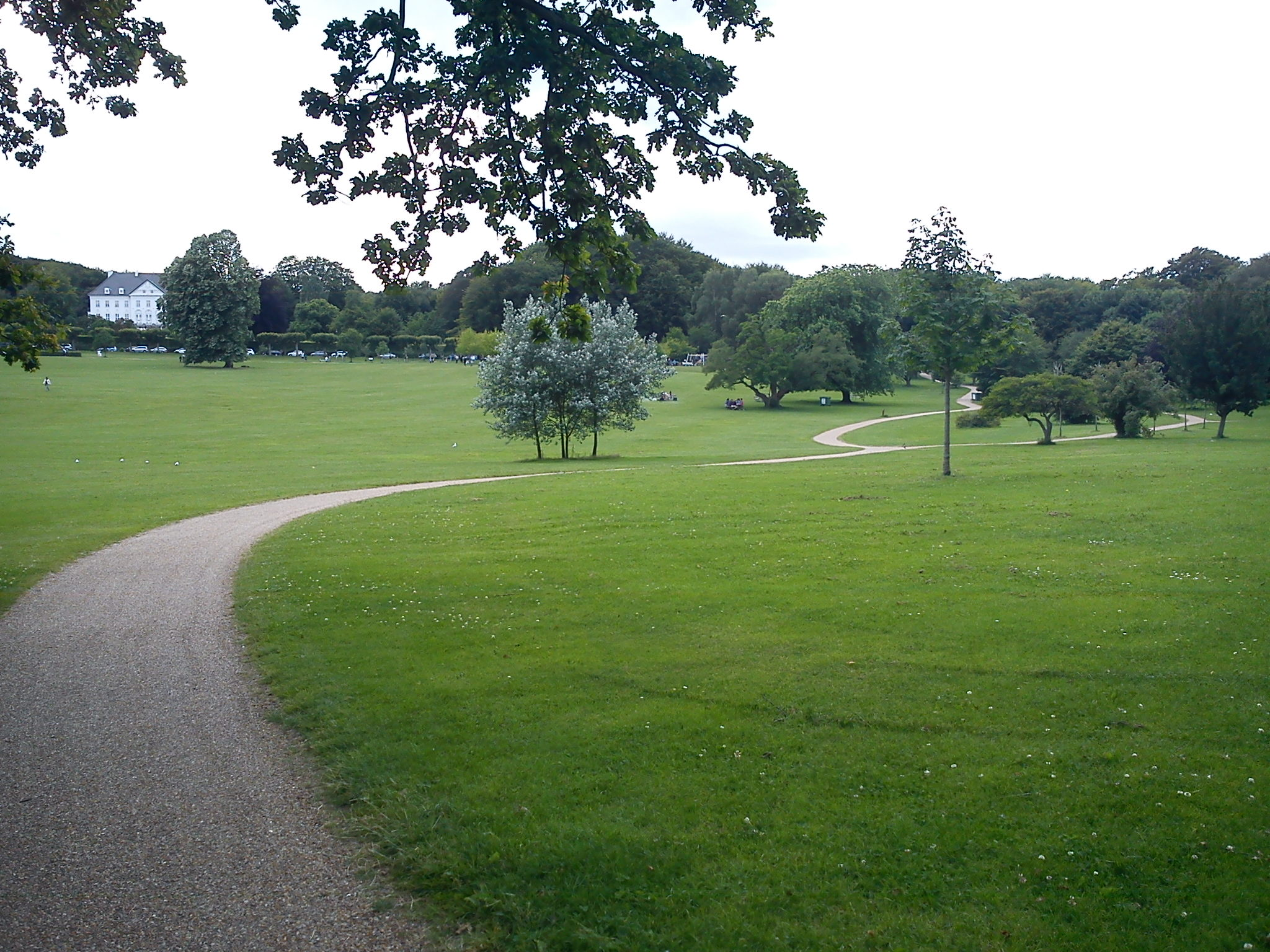
The path through Træsamlingen.

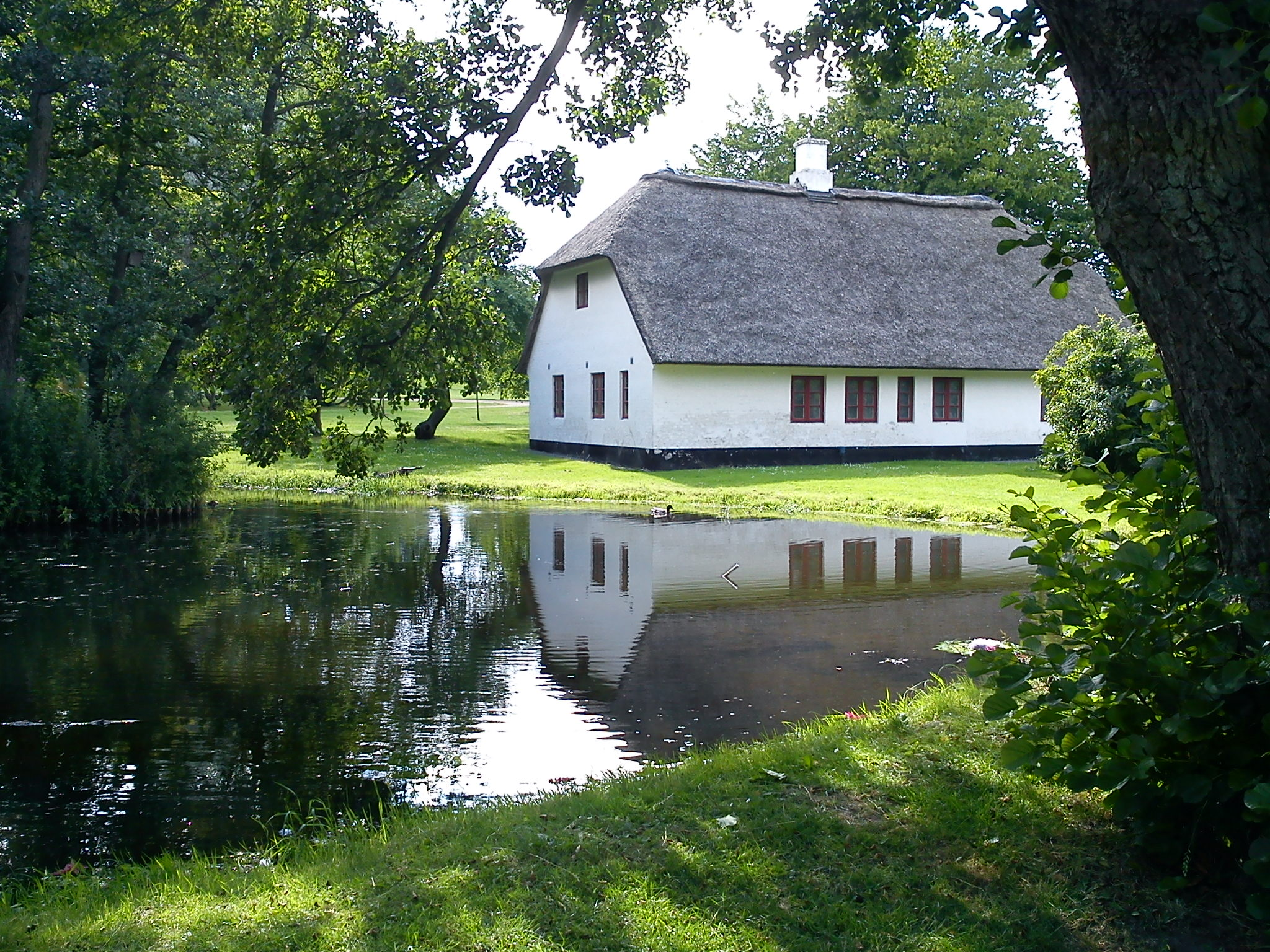
Donbæk Houses

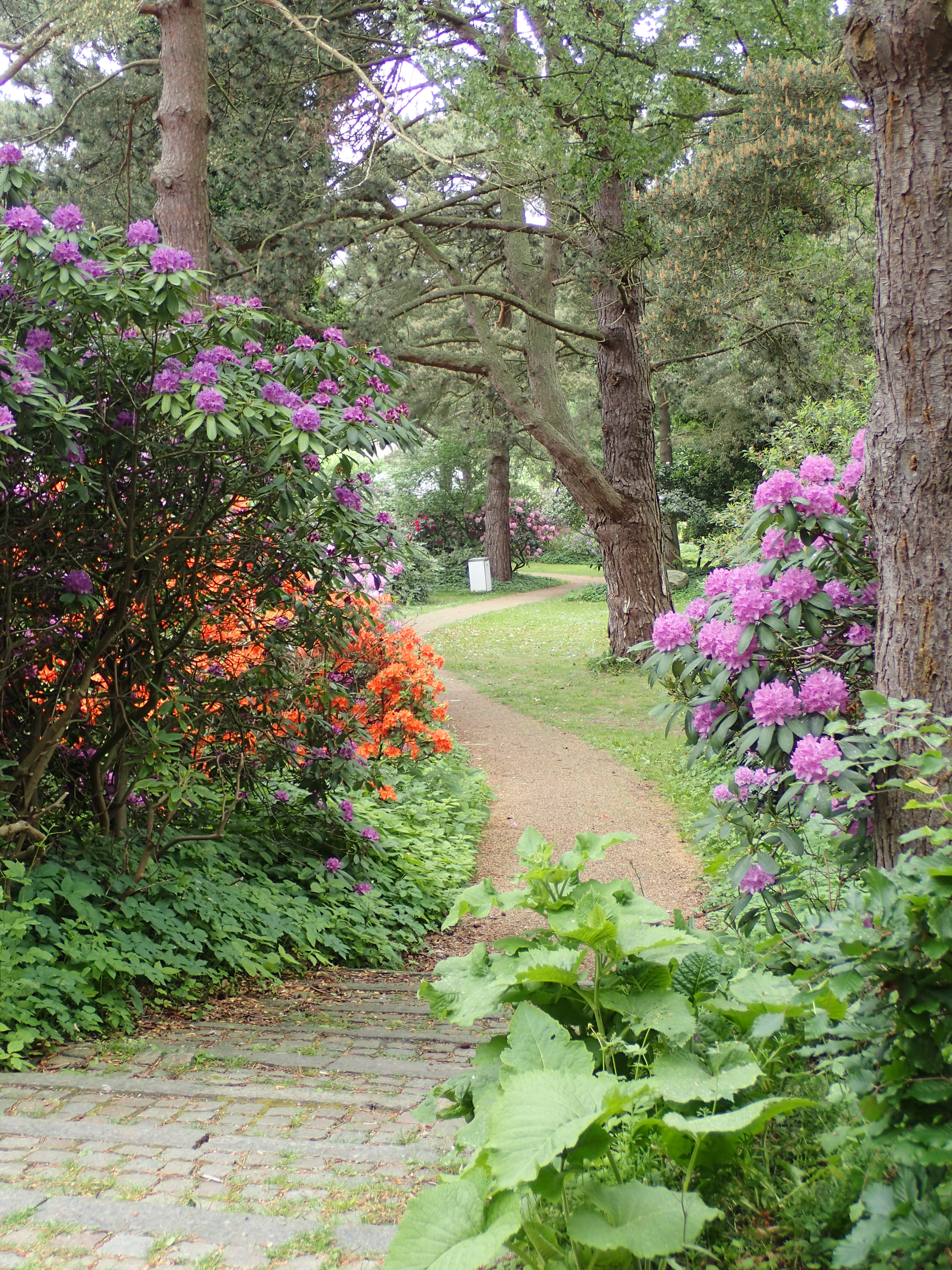
The Donbæk garden.

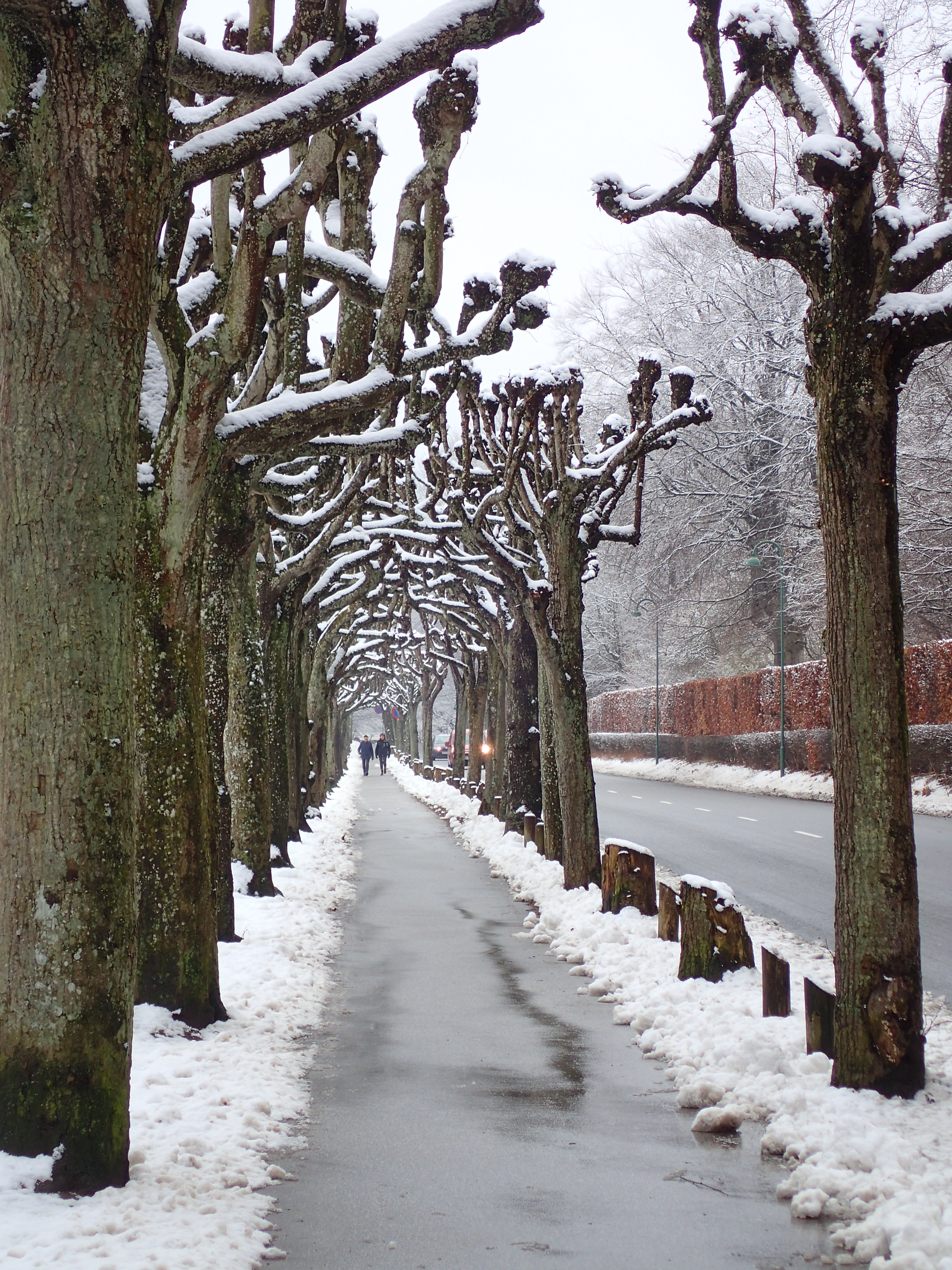
The lime tree avenue.

World War I monument

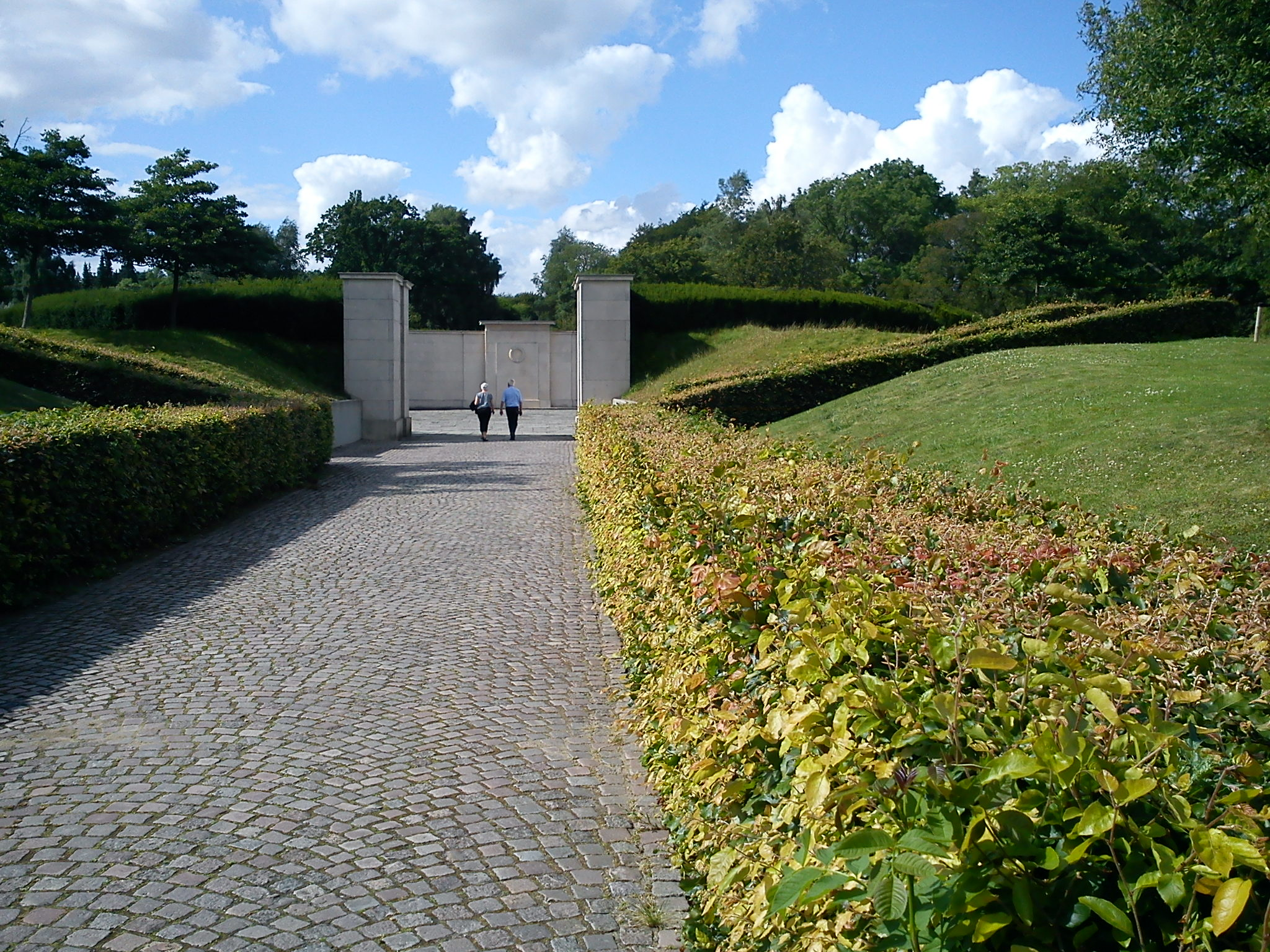
Entry path to the monument.

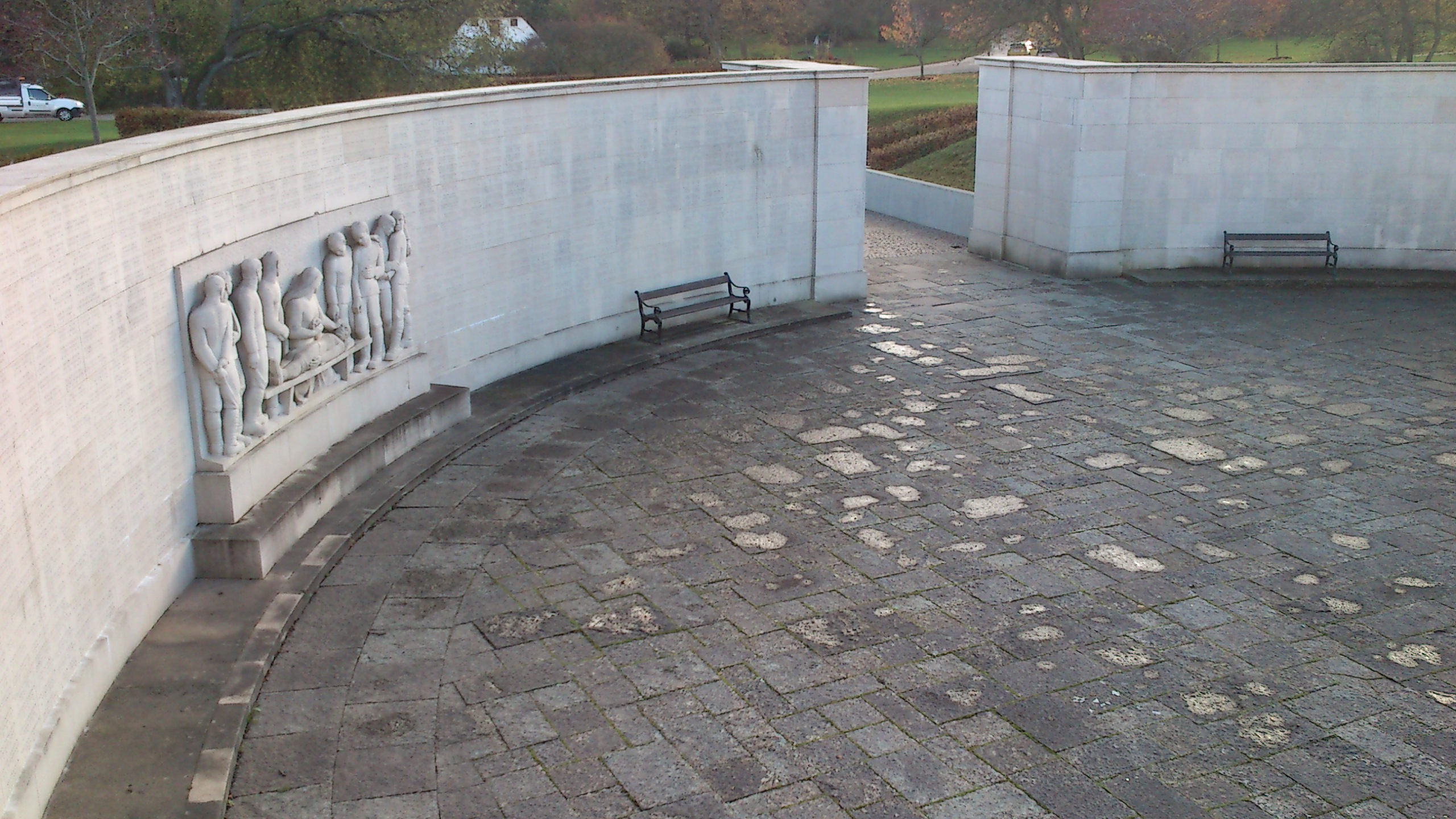
Inside the World War I Memorial.

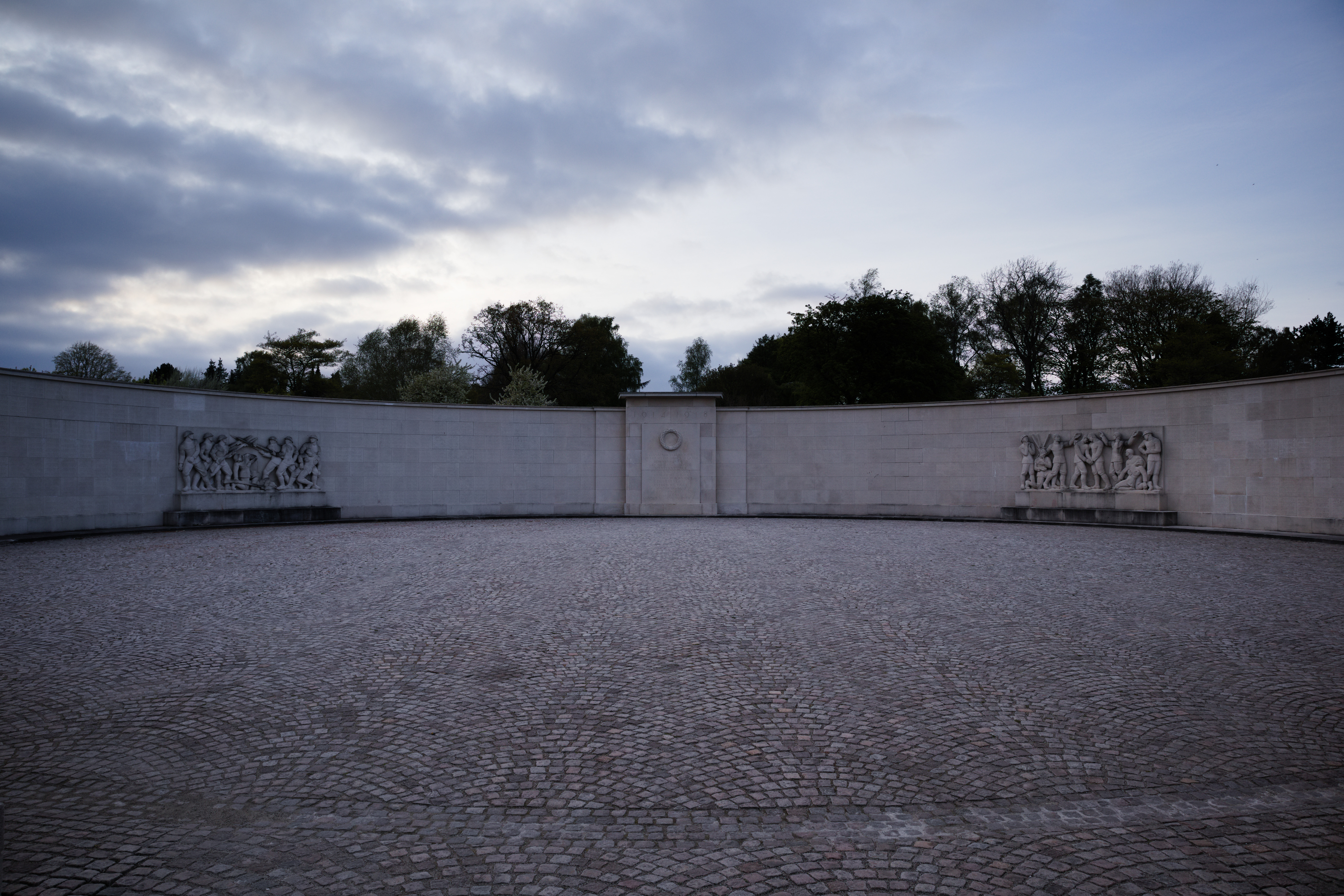
Wide-angle view from the entrance

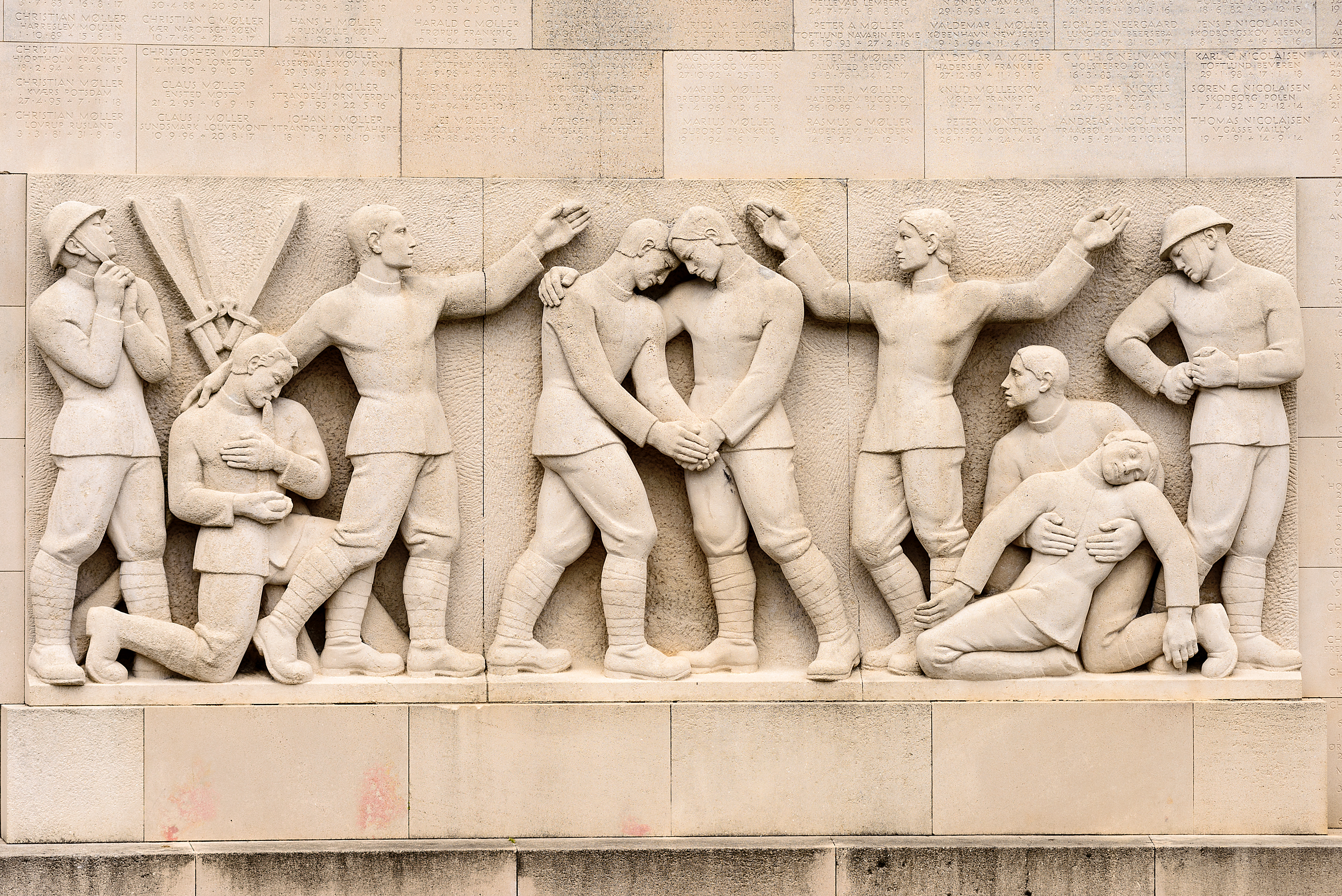
From the inside walls

== Sources ==
- Mindeparken Aarhus Municipality (in Danish)
- Mindeparken Arrangør i Aarhus, Aarhus Municipality (in Danish)
