= Åkrogen =

Beach and park in Aarhus Municipality, Denmark

- Beach
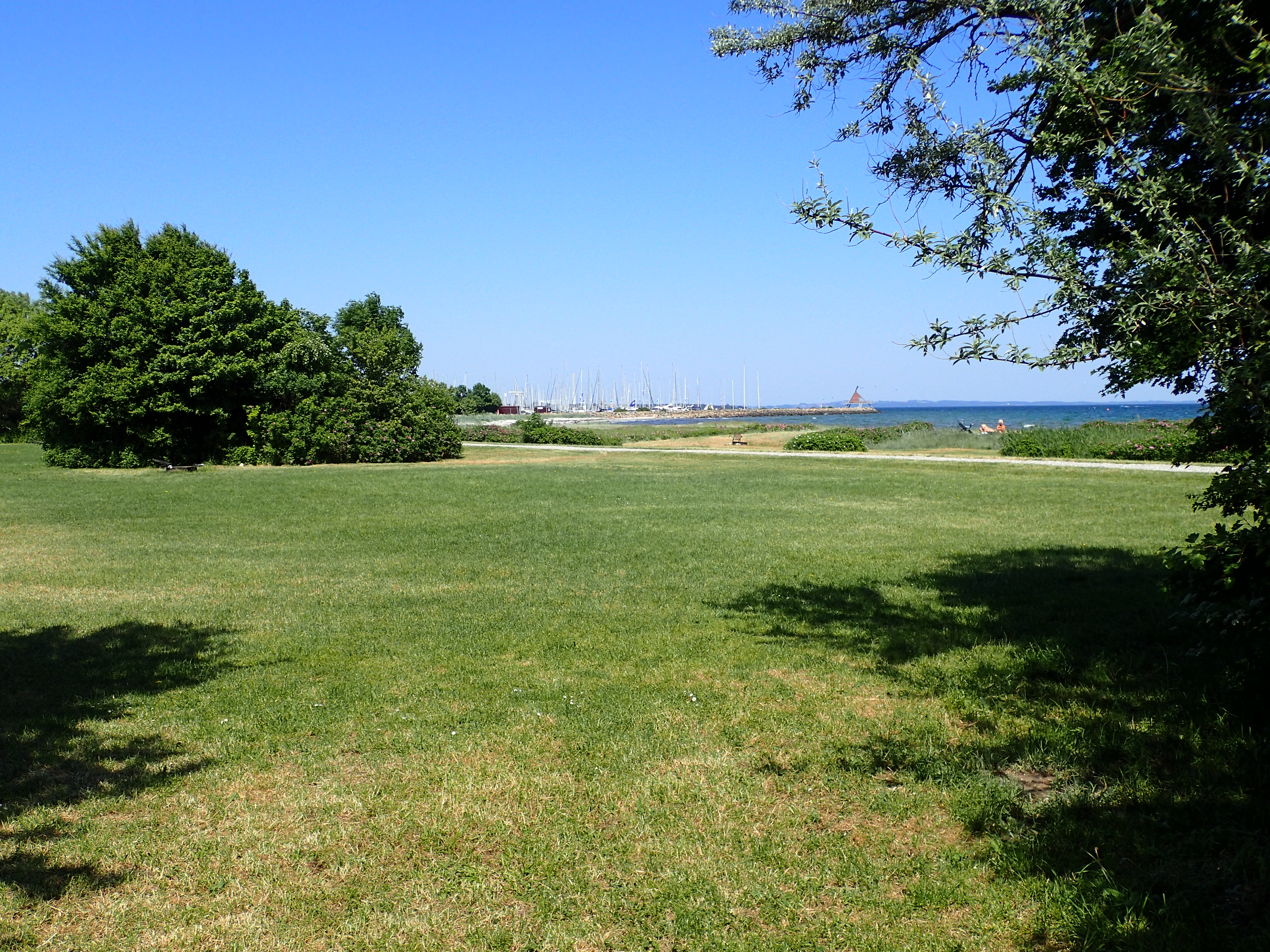
- Åkrogen, from the south section
- Interactive map of Åkrogen
- Coordinates: 56.205172°N 10.283763°E
- Location: Risskov, Aarhus, Denmark

Dimensions
  - Length: 1,290 metres (1,410 yards)
- Access: Åkrogs Strandvej, Buses 17, 123

Åkrogen (lit.: River-nook) is an urban, public beach and park in the northern parts of Aarhus, Denmark.

Åkrogen is situated in both the neighborhood of Risskov and the suburb of Egå on the Bay of Aarhus at Egå Marina. The beach park is divided by the marina in a southern and a northern section. Kalø Vig and Helgenæs is in the east and a bit inland to the west is the lake of Egå Engsø.

The beach itself is fairly slim, between 10 and 12 metres (33 and 39 feet) wide, with a beachline stretching for some 850 metres (2,790 feet) at the southern section and 440 metres (1,440 feet) in the northern section. It is coarse sandy beach with gravel and several coastal protections composed of rows of boulders extending into the sea. A few short stretches of the beach are broader with white sand. The waters are very shallow with a sandy bottom and reach a depth of 2 metres (6 feet 7 inches) some 250 metres (820 feet) from the coast. Saline content is 20-35‰ and there's a weak northbound current.

Åkrogen is a popular beach for windsurfers and kitsurfers due to the shallow waters and brisk winds. Each beach section is equipped with a 20 metres (66 feet) jetty extending into the sea, from which small watercraft can be landed or launched. The Canadian newspaper "The Globe and Mail" voted Åkrogen one of the 10 best beaches in the world in 2008.

The beach is maintained in conjunction with two park areas south and north of the Egå Marina. The southern section is situated along the Egå river where it terminates in the Kattegat sea. Both park sections comprise large grassy areas, trees and rows of bushes, designed to provide windbreaks and limited privacy for beachgoers and sunbathers. The grass extends to the beach itself, providing enough room to fly kites or play team sports and there is a playground for children.

== Access ==
The park lies at end of the cul-de-sac Åkrogs Strandvej, which culminates in a parking lot with room for some 20 cars and a parking space for the public buses that serve the area. Buses run from central Aarhus and the university to the bus stops in the area. Danish National Cycle Route 5 runs along the coast of eastern Jutland from Odder Municipality to central Aarhus, passing the Docklands, before it leads north past Den Permanente and Bellevue Beach. The route eventually reach Åkrogen and continue further north. A coastal footpath leads most of the way from Riis Skov in the south. Egå marina lies 500 metres (1,600 feet) north of the beach, providing access by sea for larger boats and ships.

== Safety ==
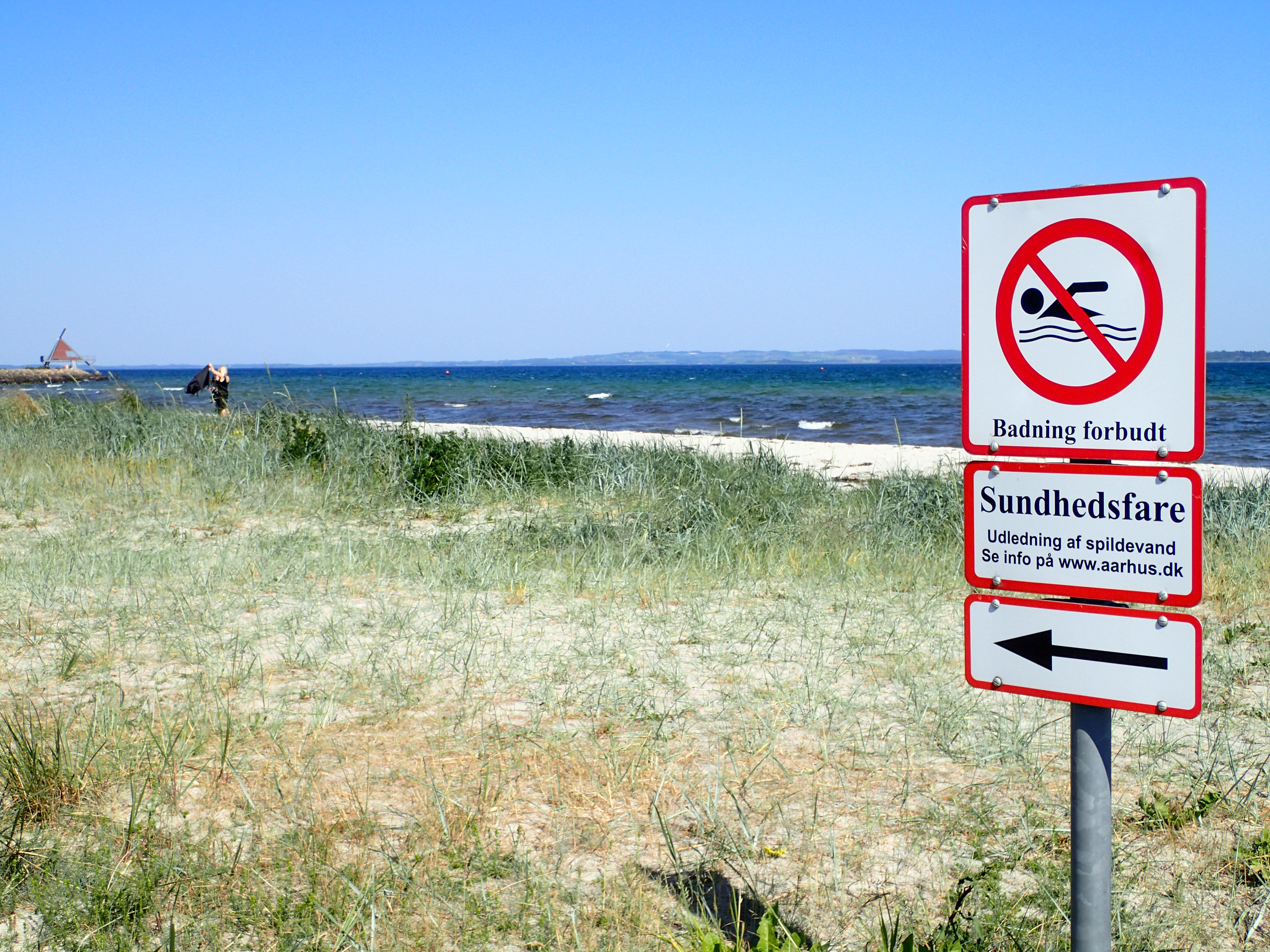
At the mouth of the Egå stream, bathing is prohibited

Åkrogen is not a Blue Flag beach and there are no life guards in neither summer nor winter, but both the south and north sections has a safety station with a lifesaver and the entire park is located in a populated area. Aarhus Municipality frequently tests the water for harmful bacteria and algae and rates all beaches on a yearly basis. In 2014 and 2015 the beach received the highest possible 3/3 rating.

The Egå river empties immediately south of the Egå Marina and swimming is prohibited here and some 200 metres (660 feet) south. Warning signs signals the restricted beach stretch.

== Sources ==
- Stadsarkitektens kontor (2003): Lokalplan nr. 684, Aarhus Municipality (in Danish). The local plan for the area.
