= Bellevue Beach, Aarhus =

Beach in Aarhus, Denmark

Bellevue Beach
- Beach
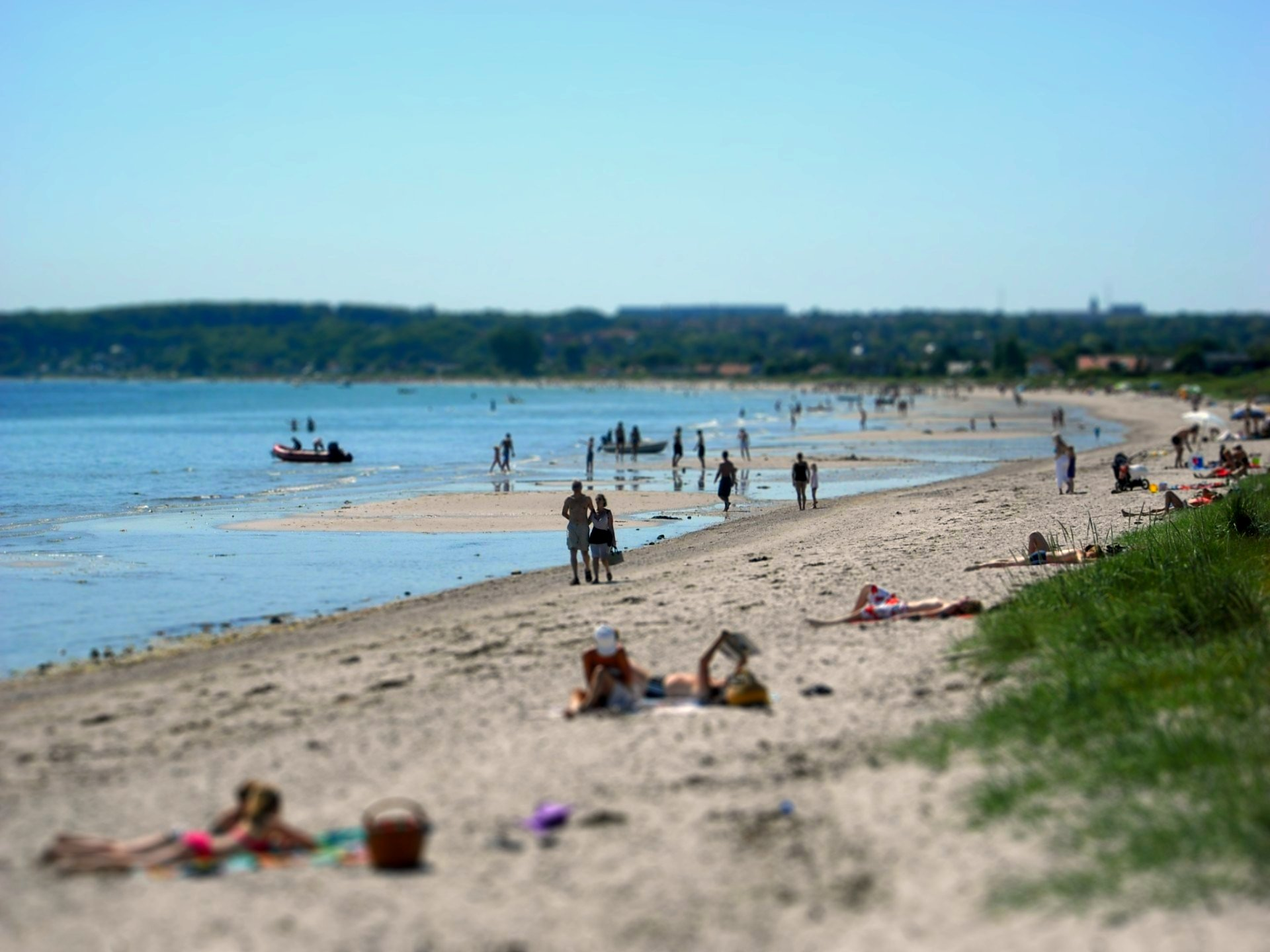
- Bellevue Beach
- Interactive map of Bellevue Beach
- Coordinates: 56.190°N 10.249°E
- Location: Aarhus, Denmark

Dimensions
  - Length: 1,500 meters
- Access: Fortevej, Bus 20

Bellevue Beach is a public Blue Flag beach park in Aarhus, Denmark. It is located in the northern district of Aarhus N, 4 kilometres from the city centre, on the Bay of Aarhus.

Bellevue Beach is one of two beach parks in the Risskov neighbourhood, the other one being the smaller Risskov Strandpark a bit south, and one of four beach parks in Aarhus. The two peninsulas of Tvedhalvøen and Helgenæs is visible across the bay in the east. In the south, there is a panoramic view of the Aarhus skyline, including the urban forest of Riis Skov. A few kilometres to the north, is the larger beach park of Åkrogen and the Egå Marina.

== Facilities ==
The beach at Bellevue Beach is a white sandy beach some 1,500 meters long and between 25 and 40 meters wide. The beach park tends to be popular due to the finely grained sand, the shallow water, relative proximity to the inner city, and the scenic view of Aarhus on the horizon. The beach park is open year-round for everyone at no charge.

The park area in connection to the beach, includes a parking area, access to drinking water, lavatories, basic emergency equipment, a kiosk, thrash bins, and green areas for play, picnics and somewhat secluded sunbathing. Bellevuehallerne is a sports hall complex immediately west of the park area, and it includes a dining café.

== Safety ==
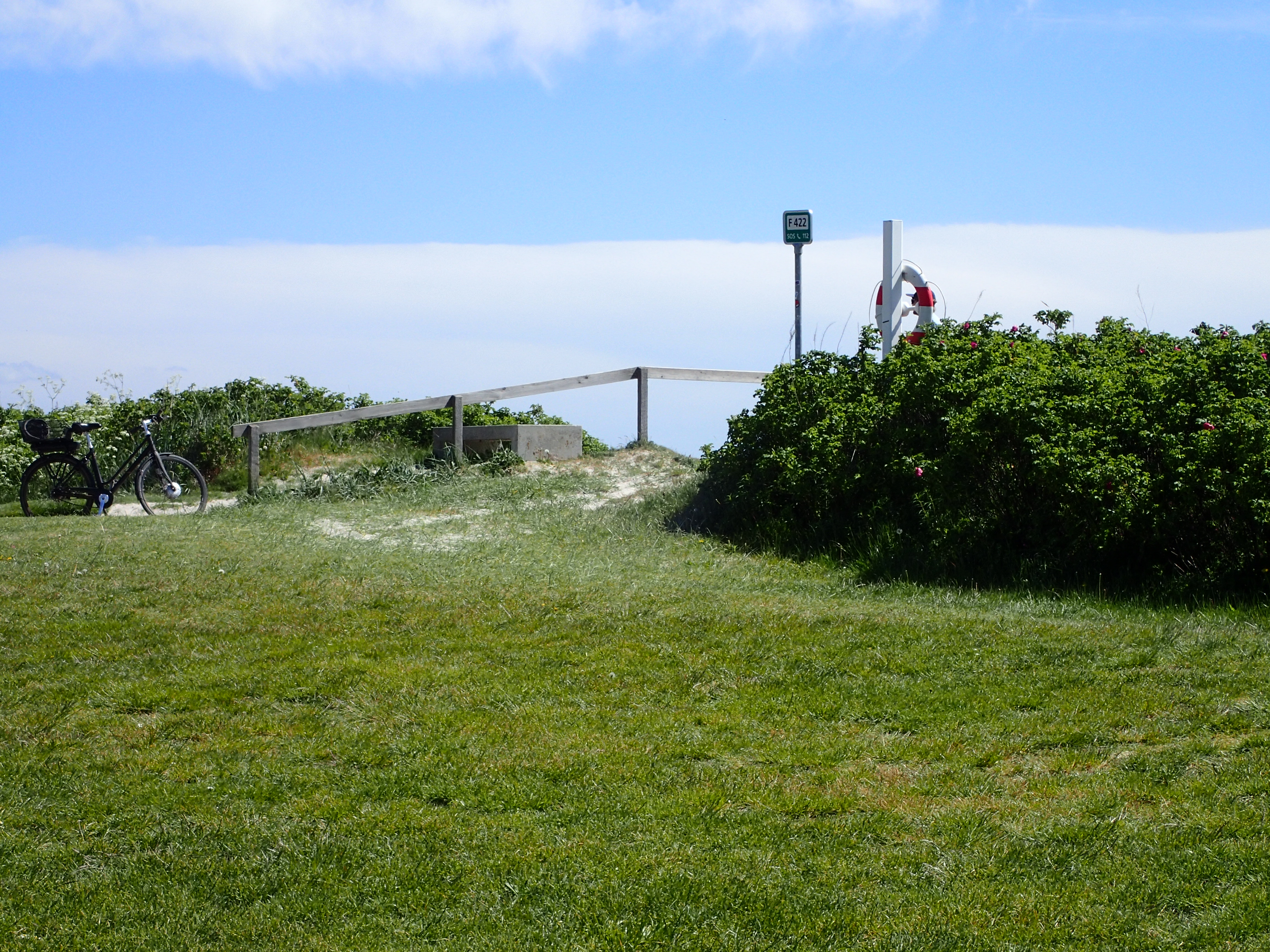
Safety Stations

Bellevue Beach has no life guard in the summer but there is a safety station with life saving equipment and an emergency telephone. The beach park is situated in an area with heavy foot traffic, busy roads and an expansive residential area, so getting help quickly should not be an issue. Aarhus Municipality frequently tests the water for harmful bacteria and algae and rates all beaches on a yearly basis. There are several rainwater pipes from the residential areas draining into the bay at Bellevue Beach, so expect the water quality to be unsuitable for bathing after heavy rainfall. The water level at Bellevue is very shallow, slowly reaching a depth of 2 meters some 100 meters from the shore.

== Access ==
The beach lies in the Risskov neighborhood at the end of Fortevej, which is served by the local yellow buses. Bus no. 20 depart from the Aarhus Central Station and stops at Fortevejen by the Bellevue Beach. Danish National Cycle Route 5 runs along the coast of eastern Jutland from Odder Municipality to central Aarhus and on to the region of Djursland in the north. In Aarhus, the route passes through the Marselisborg Forests including Ballehage Beach, and continues north past the seabath of Den Permanente in the Riis Skov forest in the northern parts of Aarhus and on to Bellevue Beach and Åkrogen. Bellevue Beach can be reached by foot from the city centre of Indre by, either along the coast or more comfortably by sidewalks through residential neighbourhoods. Marselisborg Yacht Harbour is 5 kilometres south of Bellevue Beach and Egå Marina is 2 kilometres to the north.

== Gallery ==
The beach

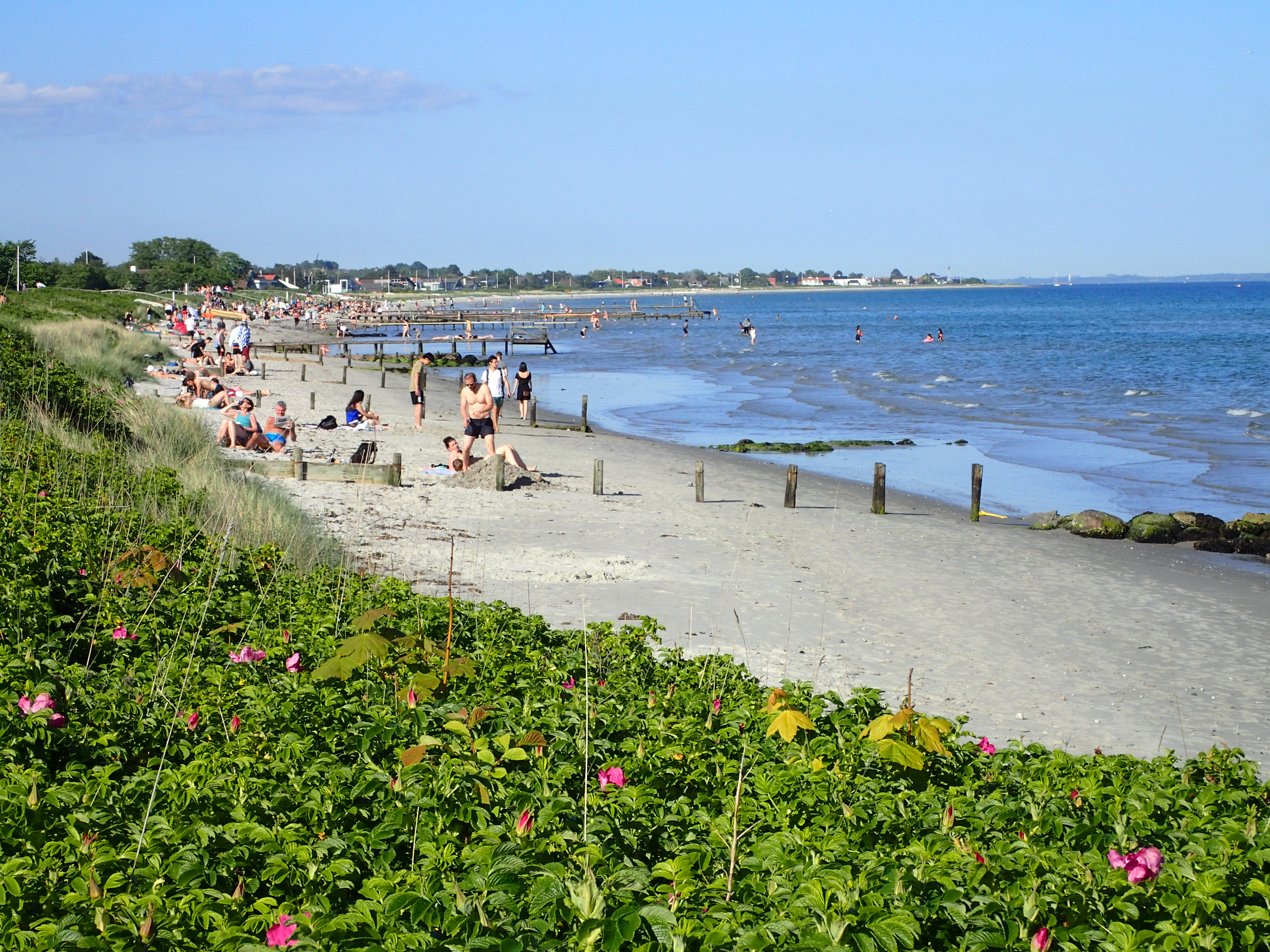
The beach

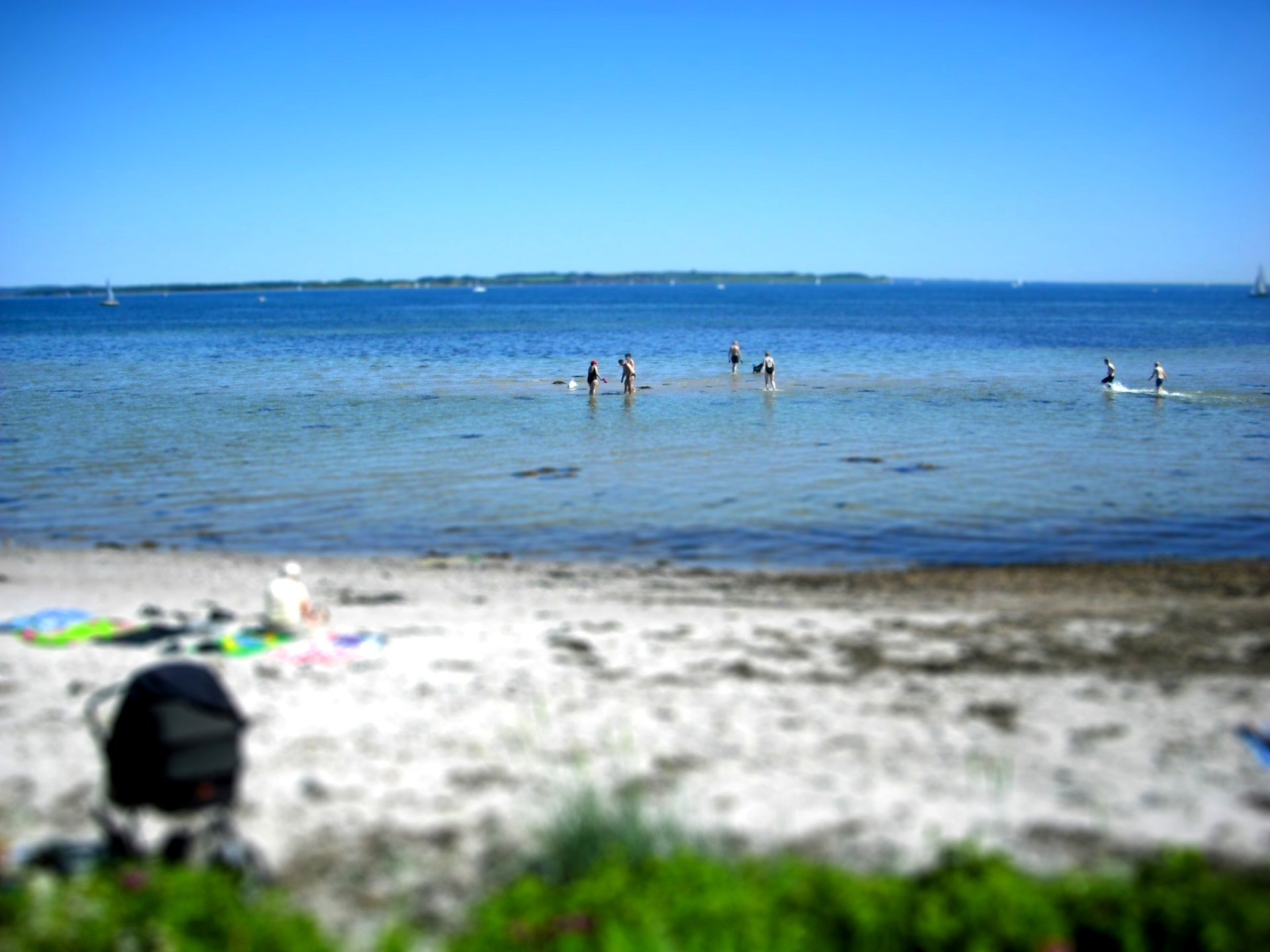
Child-friendly sandy beach with shallow water

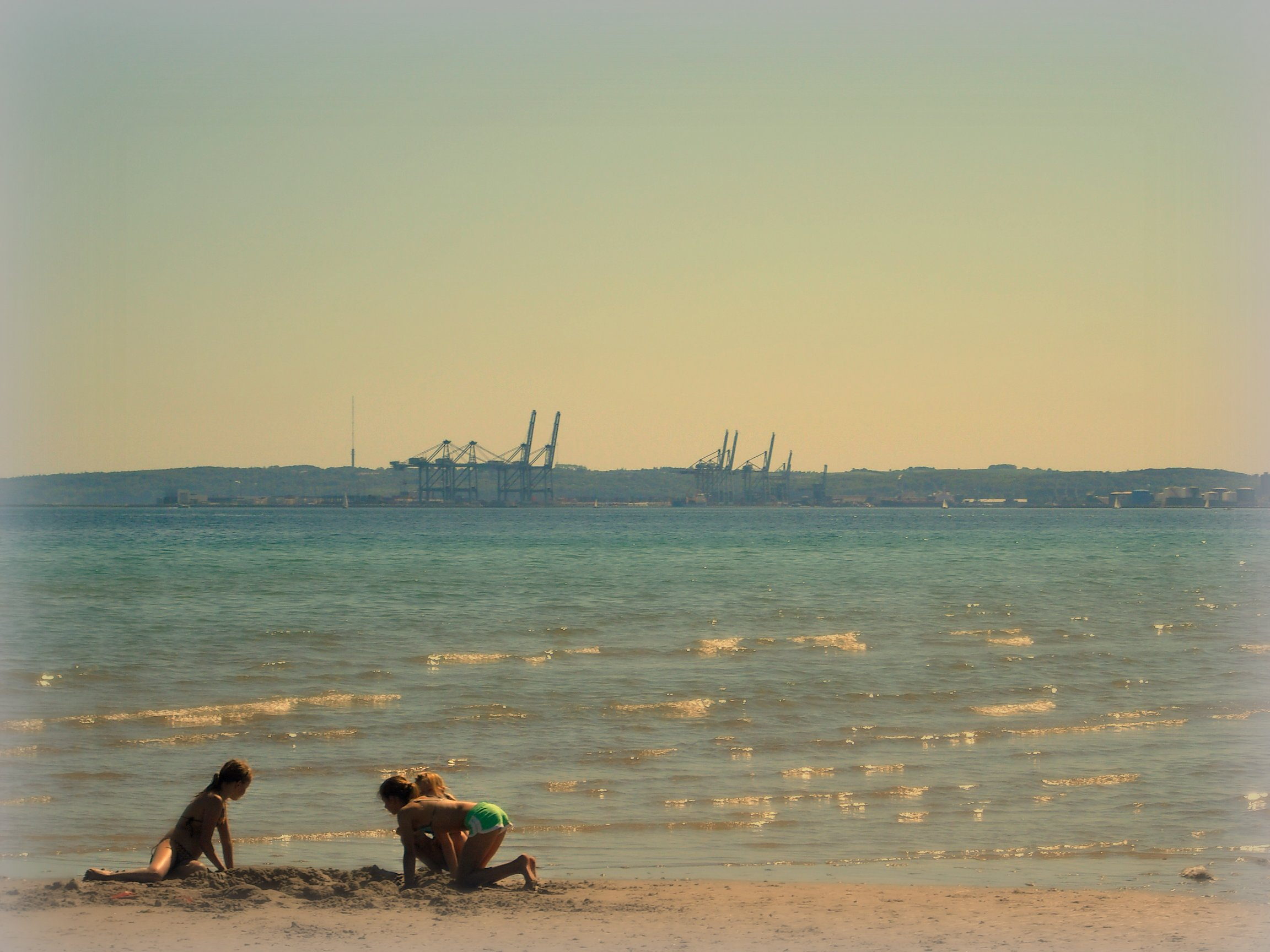
Children playing

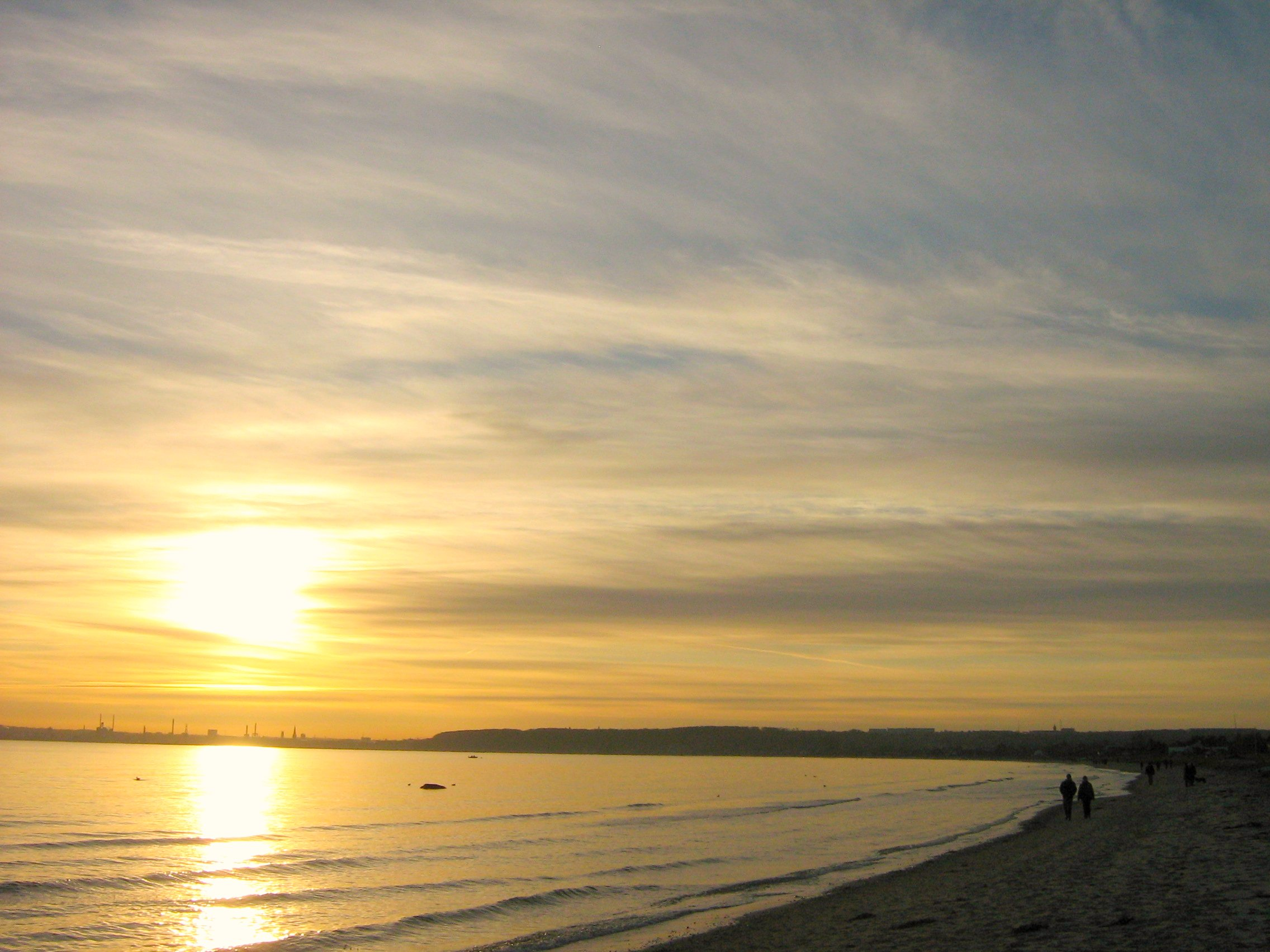
Sunrise over Aarhus

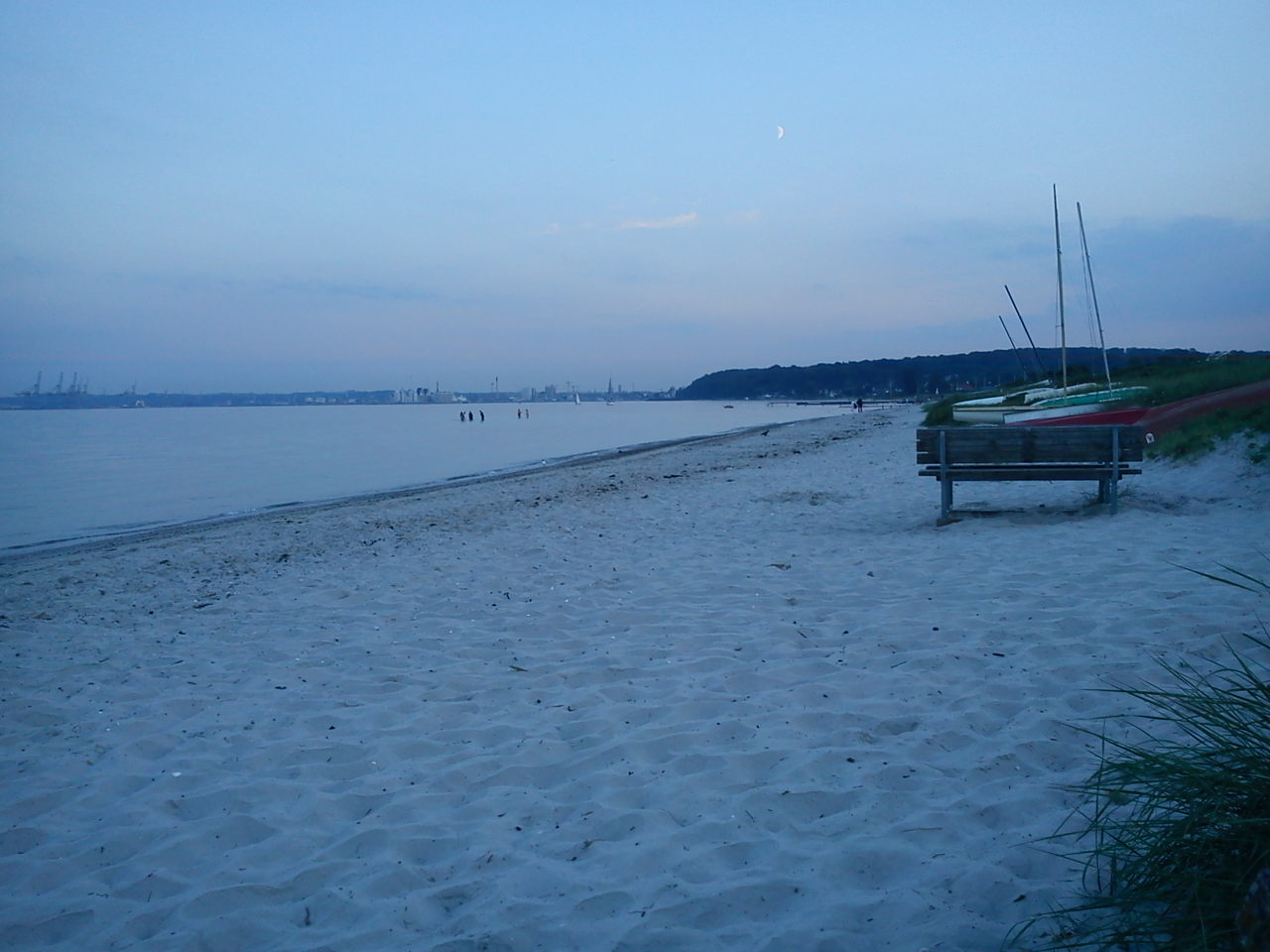
A summers eve on Bellevue Beach

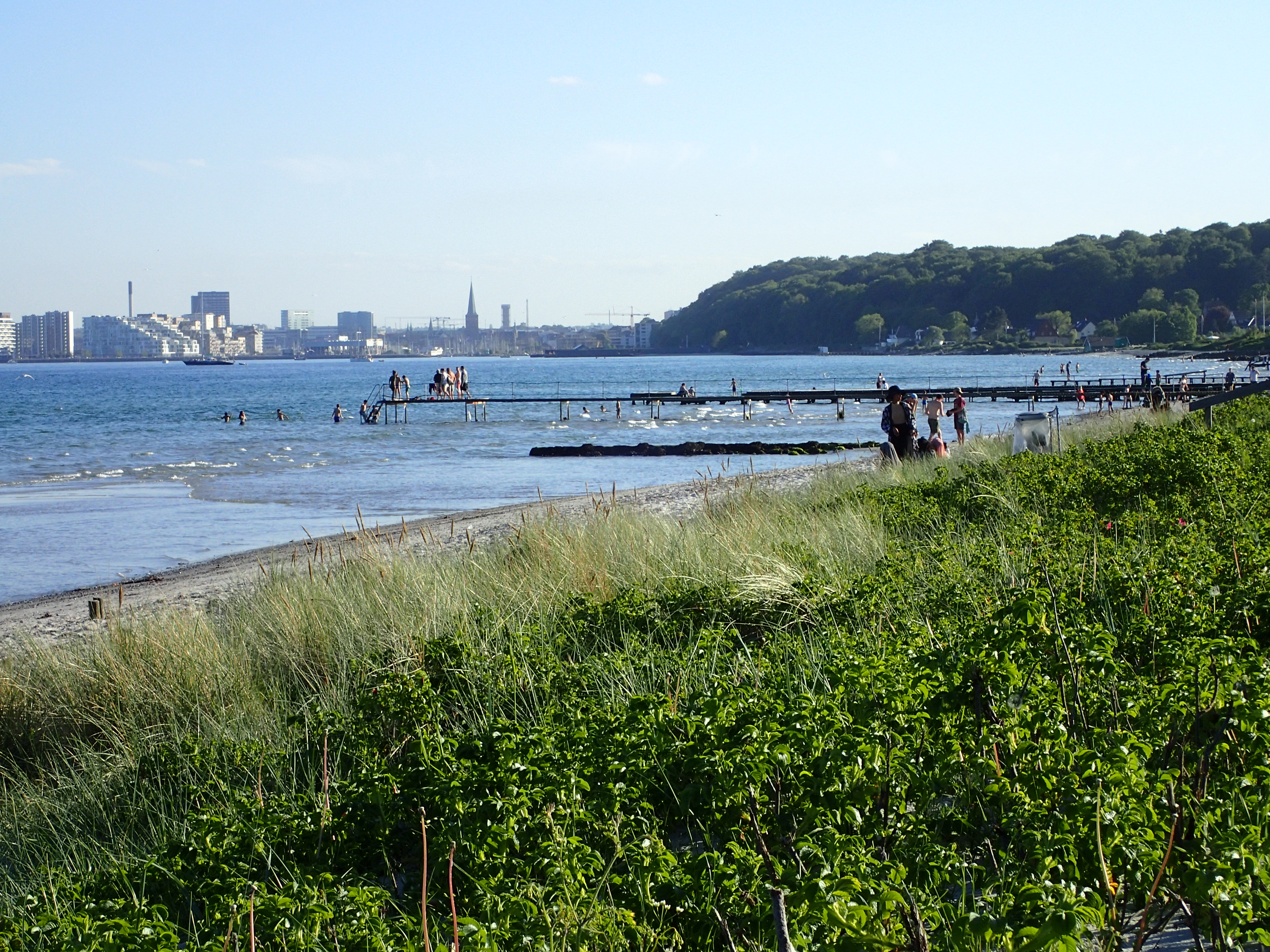
Riis Skov forest and Aarhus skyline on the horizon

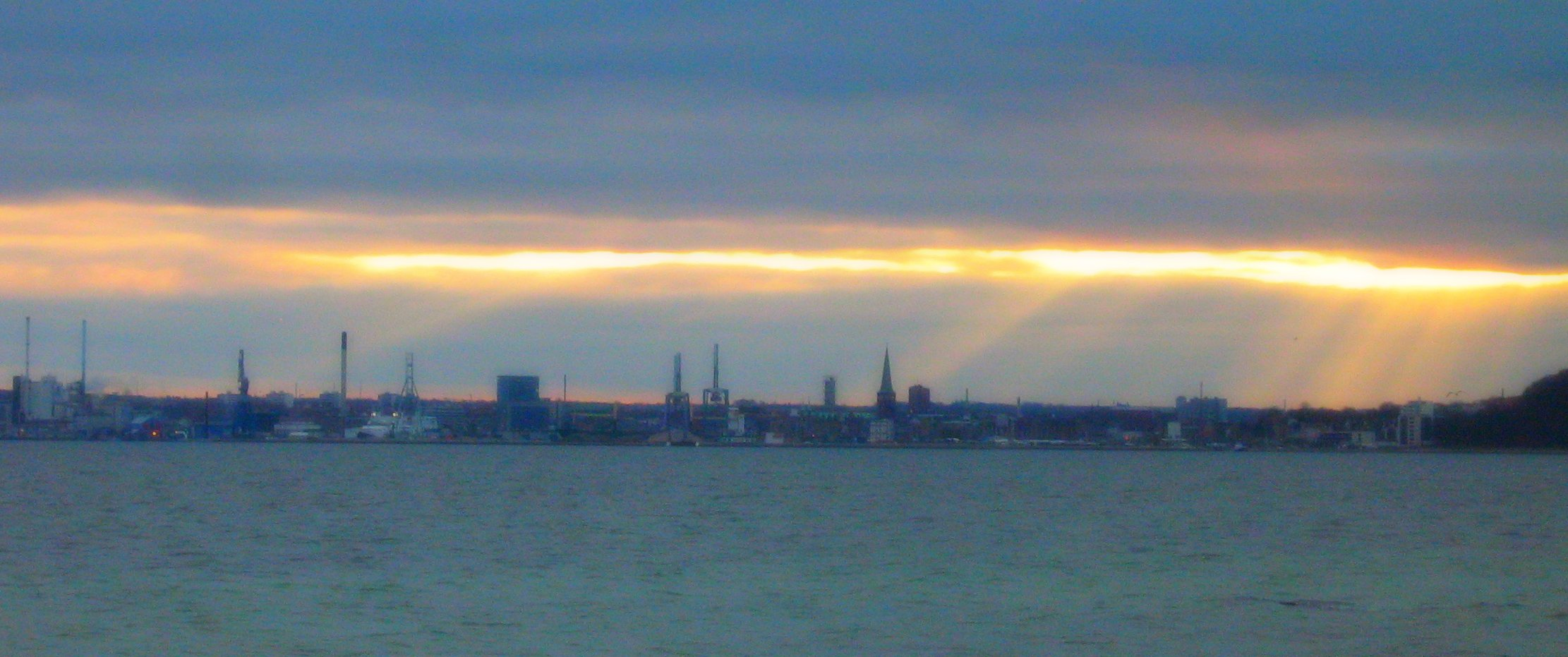
Aarhus skyline seen from Bellevue Beach

Facilities

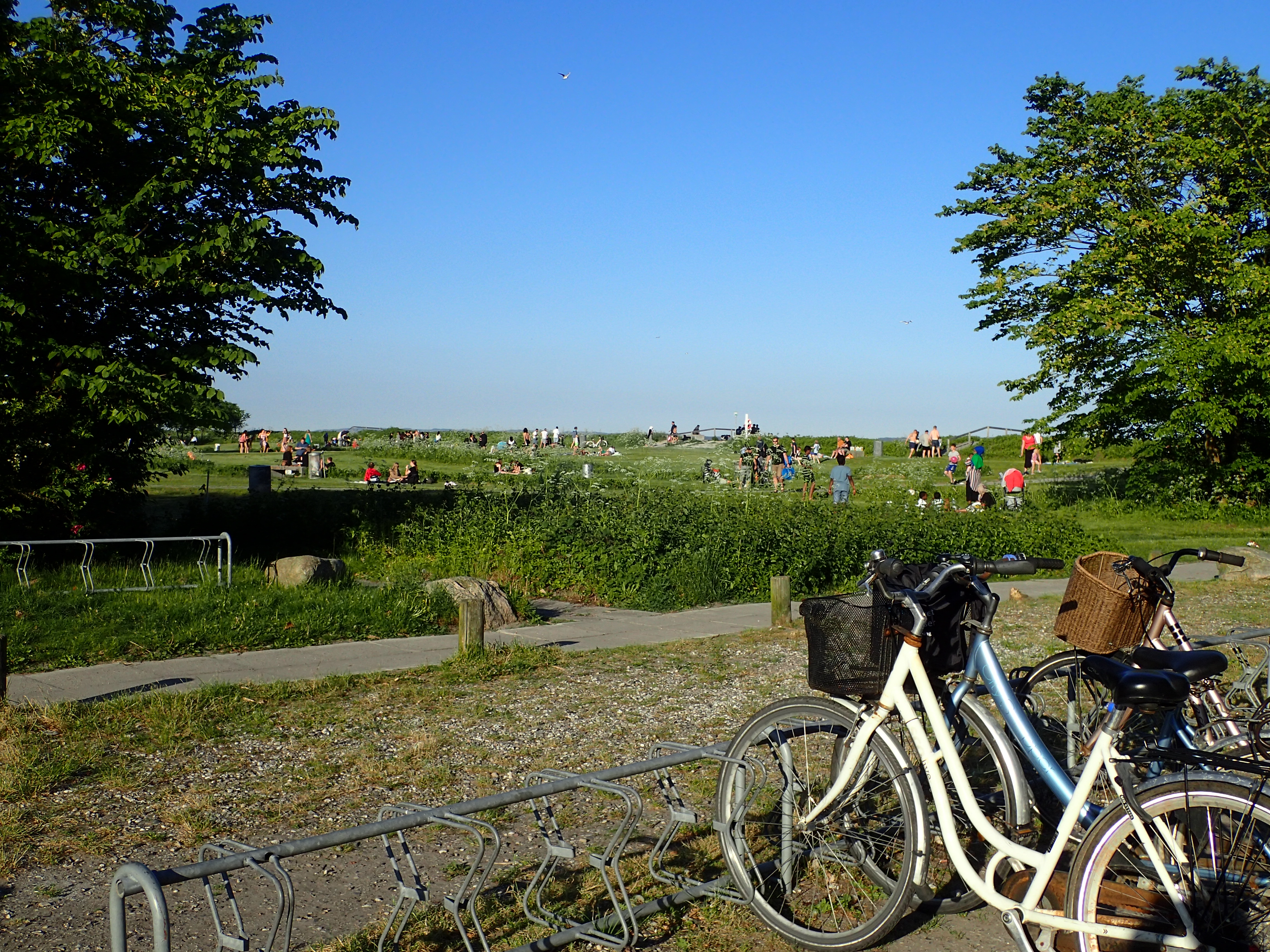
Bicycle parking at the park area

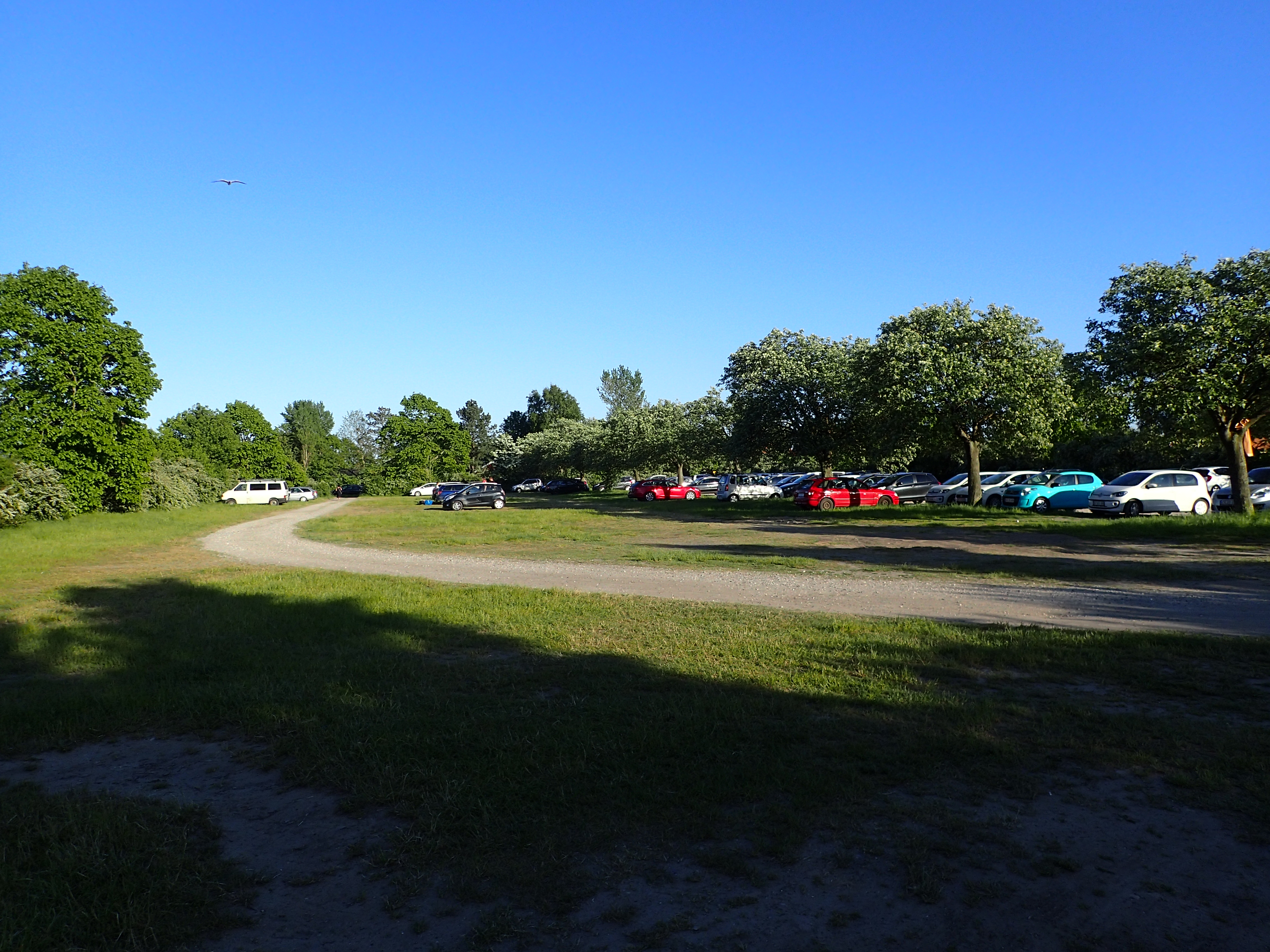
Car park area

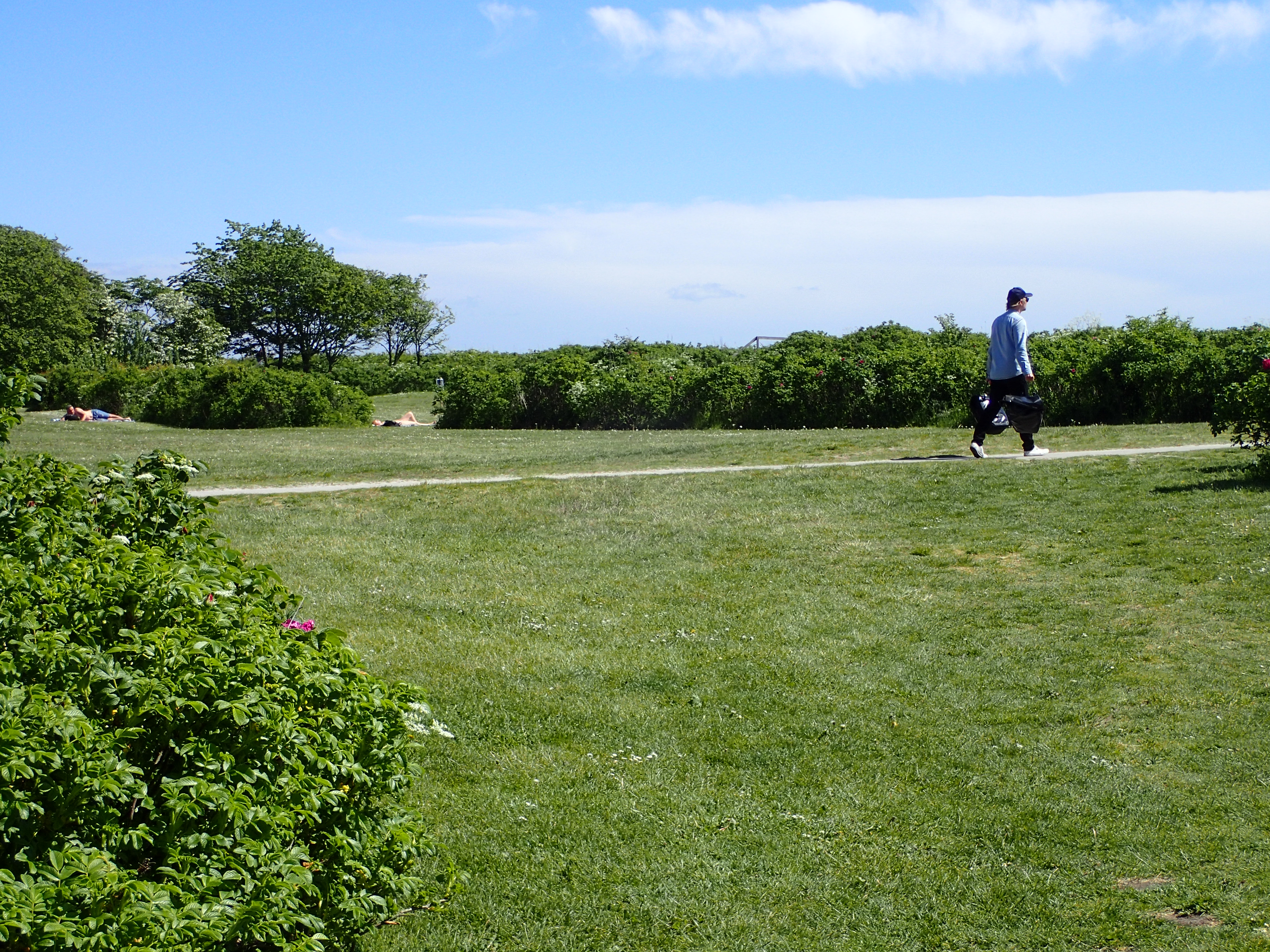
Grassy areas in the park

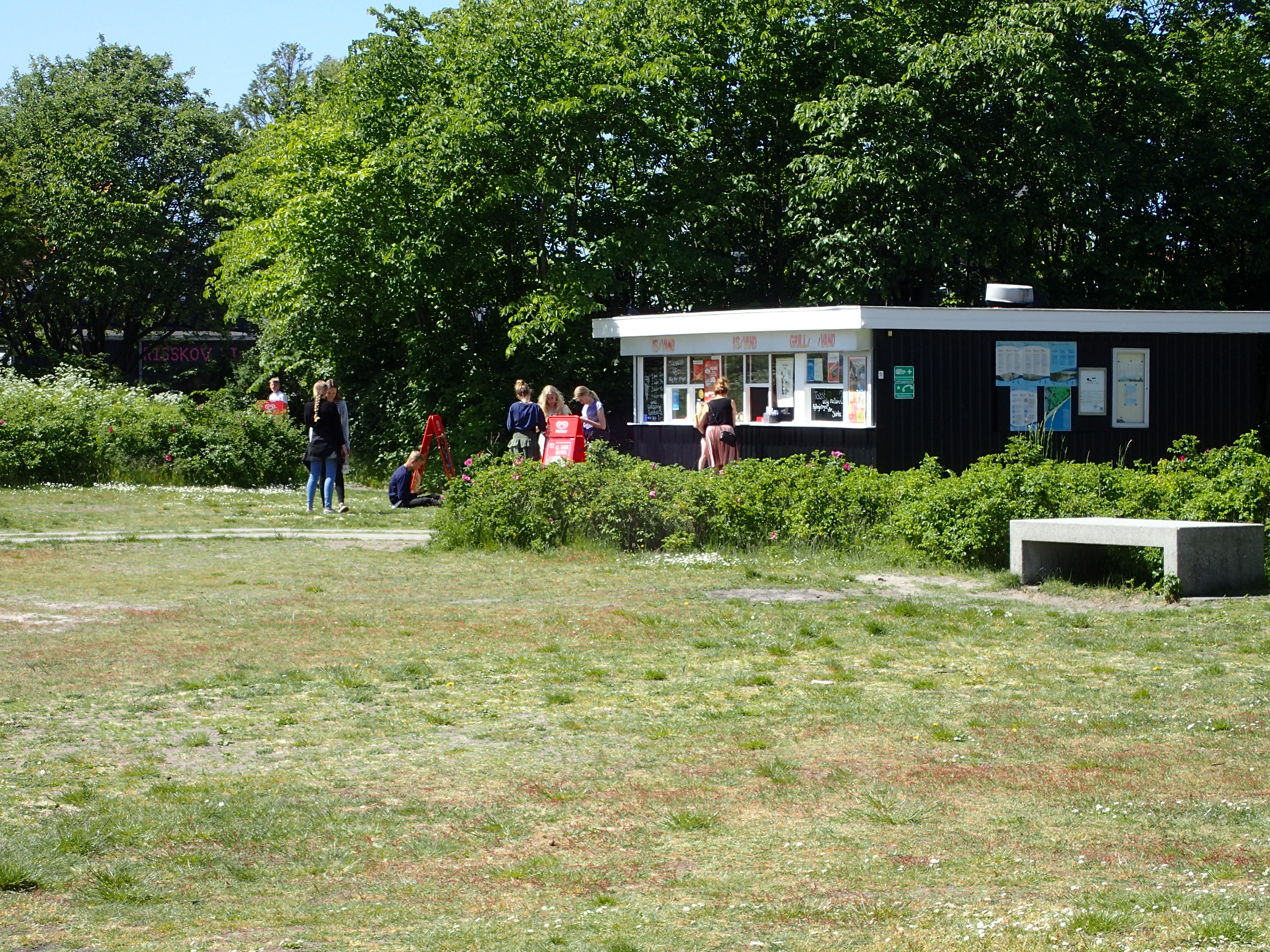
Kiosk
