= Risskov =

- Neighborhood
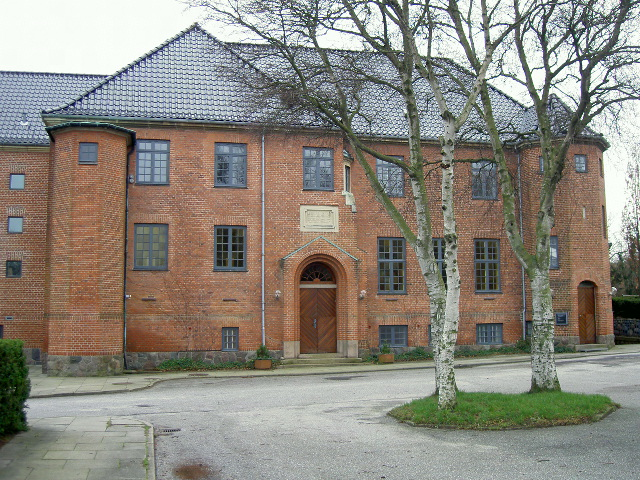
- Risskov Church

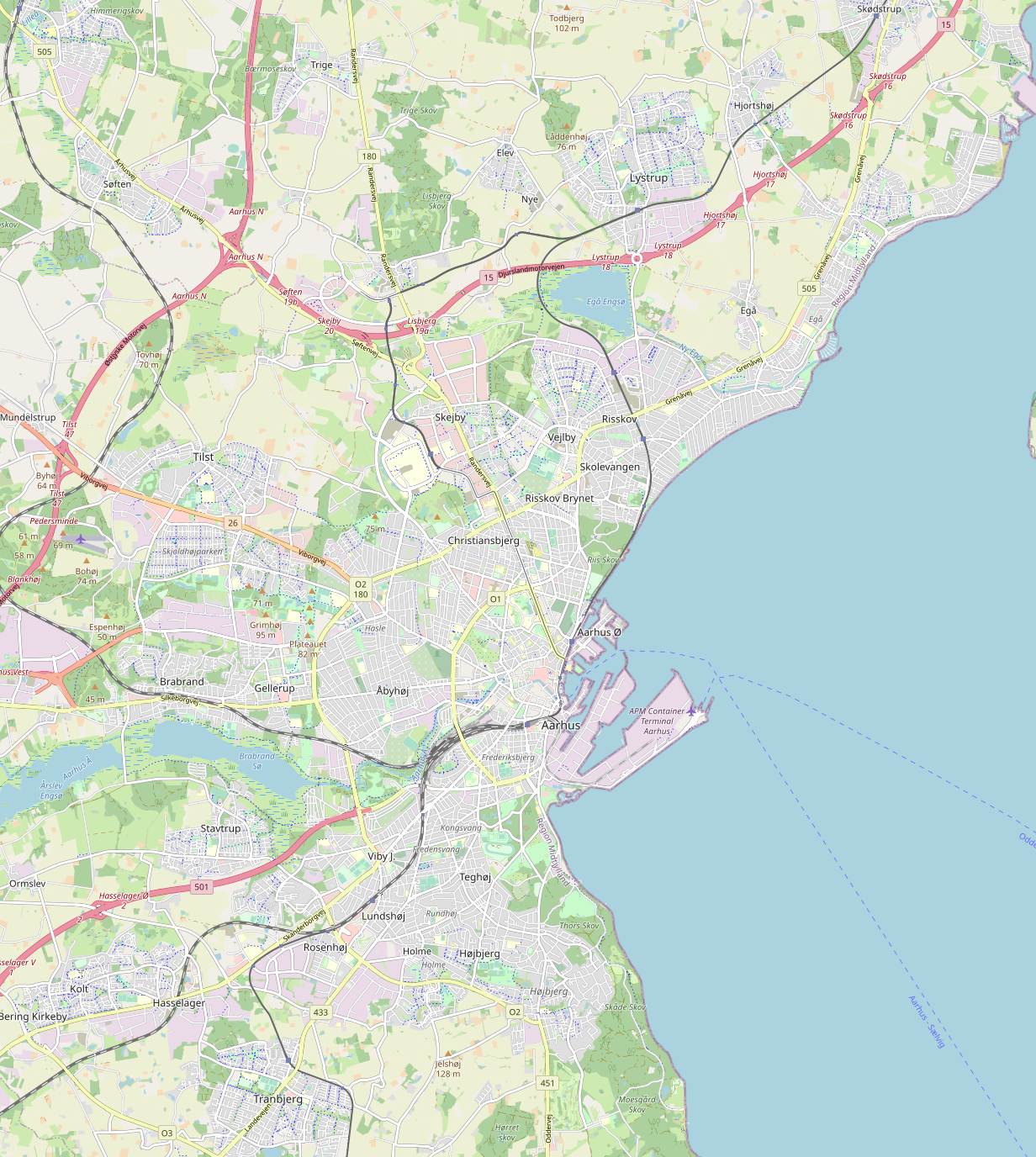
- Location within Aarhus
- Coordinates: 56.187899°N 10.227080°E
- Country: Kingdom of Denmark
- Regions of Denmark: Central Denmark Region
- Municipality: Aarhus Municipality
- District: Risskov
- Postal code: 8240

Risskov is the name of both a neighbourhood and a district in the city of Aarhus, Denmark.

The district of Risskov is sometimes referred to as Vejlby-Risskov, as it is a merger of the neighbourhood of Risskov and the neighbourhood of Vejlby. The old neighbourhood of Risskov at the seaside of the Aarhus Bay, is one of the most affluent areas in Denmark.

== Etymology ==
The name of Risskov literally means The Forest of Riis, as described on the memorial stone marking the entrance to the area and derives from the small local forest of Riis Skov. The southern parts of the forest was granted to the city of Aarhus by Margaret I of Denmark as the first, Danish public forest. In 1542, Christian III of Denmark granted the northern part of the forest to Aarhus as well. From early on, the forest was used for leisurely activities, and during the 1800s, restaurants, entertainment parks and musical pavilions sprang up in different parts of the woodland. Today the forest is known for its sharp smell of ramson in the spring and its abundance of anemones. It is still a popular destination for families and couples. Supposedly the ramson was brought to Denmark by Spanish soldiers, who then brought it to the forest of Riis Skov in 1808, during the Napoleonic Wars. In October 1951, a meteorite exploded in the atmosphere over Denmark and the largest piece of it, about the size of a clenched fist, was recovered in Riis Skov, where a memorial stone now commemorates the event.

== Attractions ==
Today the neighbourhood of Risskov is an affluent suburban area, with many large mansions and detached houses in connectivity with the sandy beaches of Bellevue and the woodland park of Riis Skov in the south.

Notable sights in Risskov include:

- Riis Skov, the first public forest in Denmark.
- Den Permanente, a public seabath.
- Bellevue Beach, one of four beach parks in Risskov.
- Åkrogen beach park. A beach and recreational nature site, north of Bellevue at Egå Marina. Only the southern section belongs to Risskov.

The beaches at Risskov, presents a panoramic view of the Bay of Aarhus, with Samsø, Helgenæs and Mols visible on the horizon on most days.

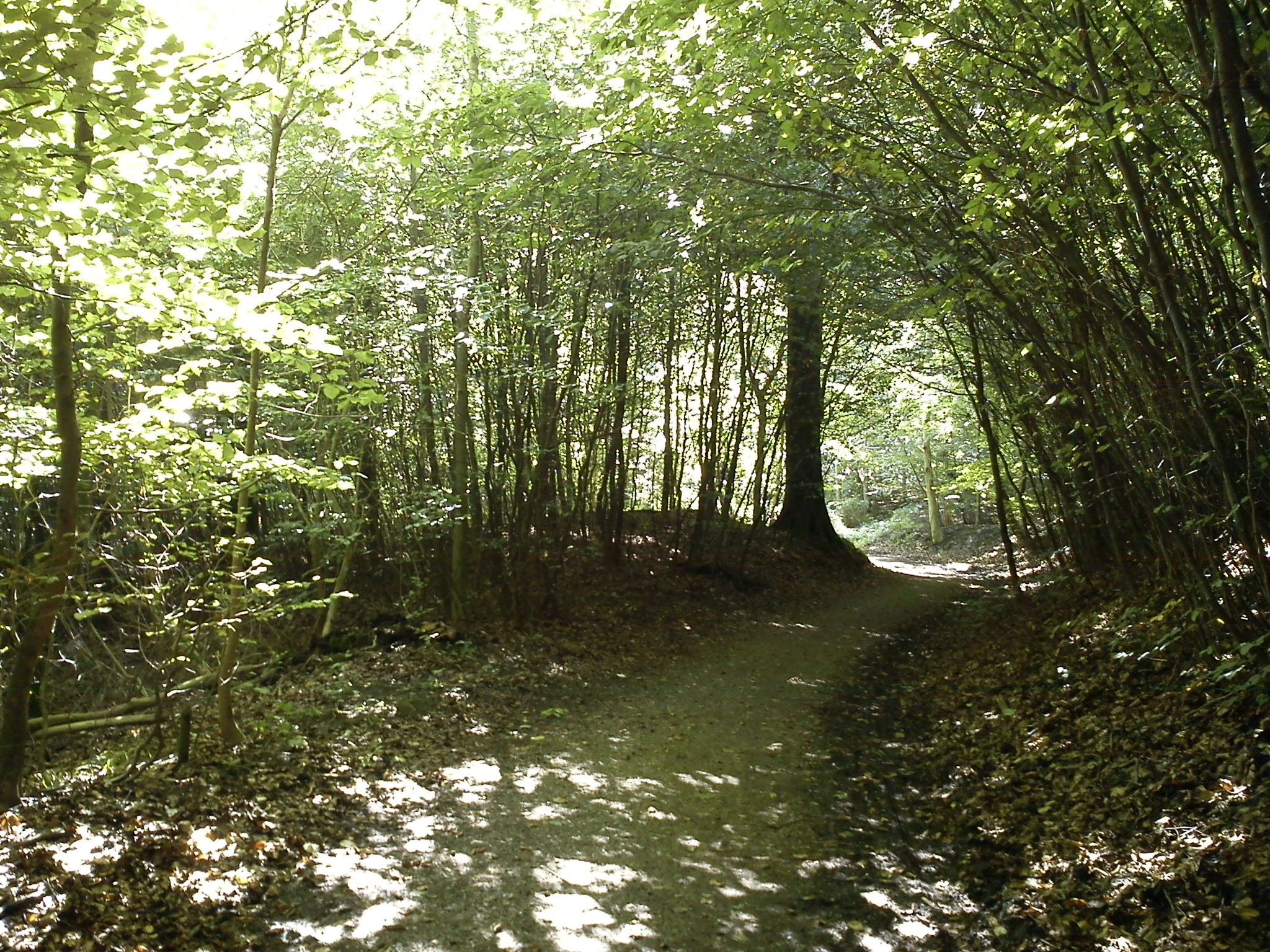
Riis Skov forest

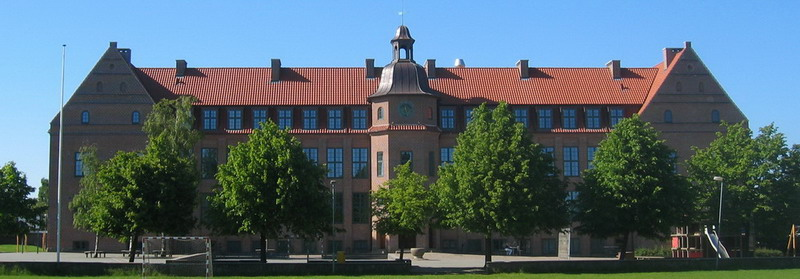
Risskov public school

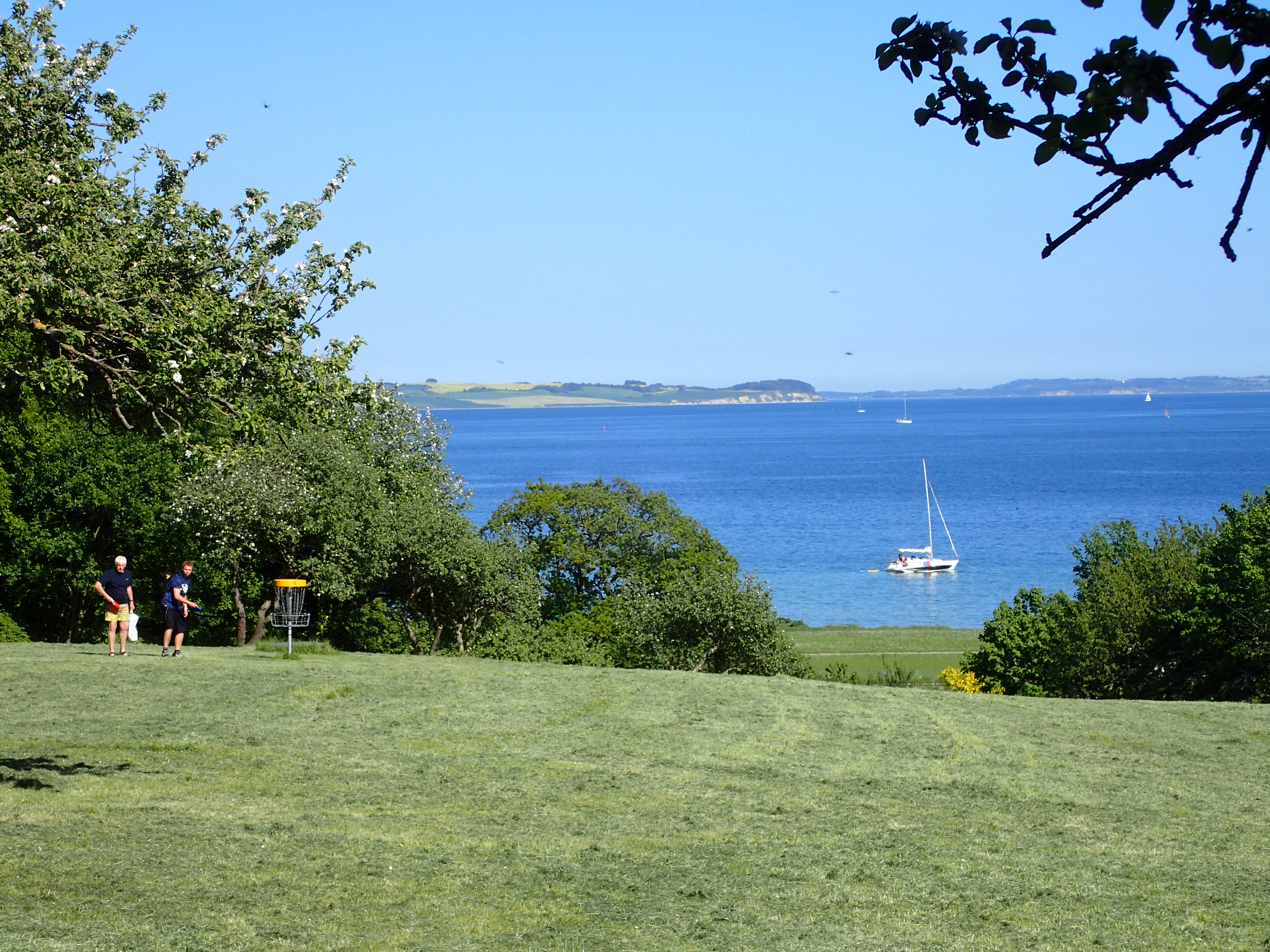
Risskov Park overlooking the Aarhus Bay

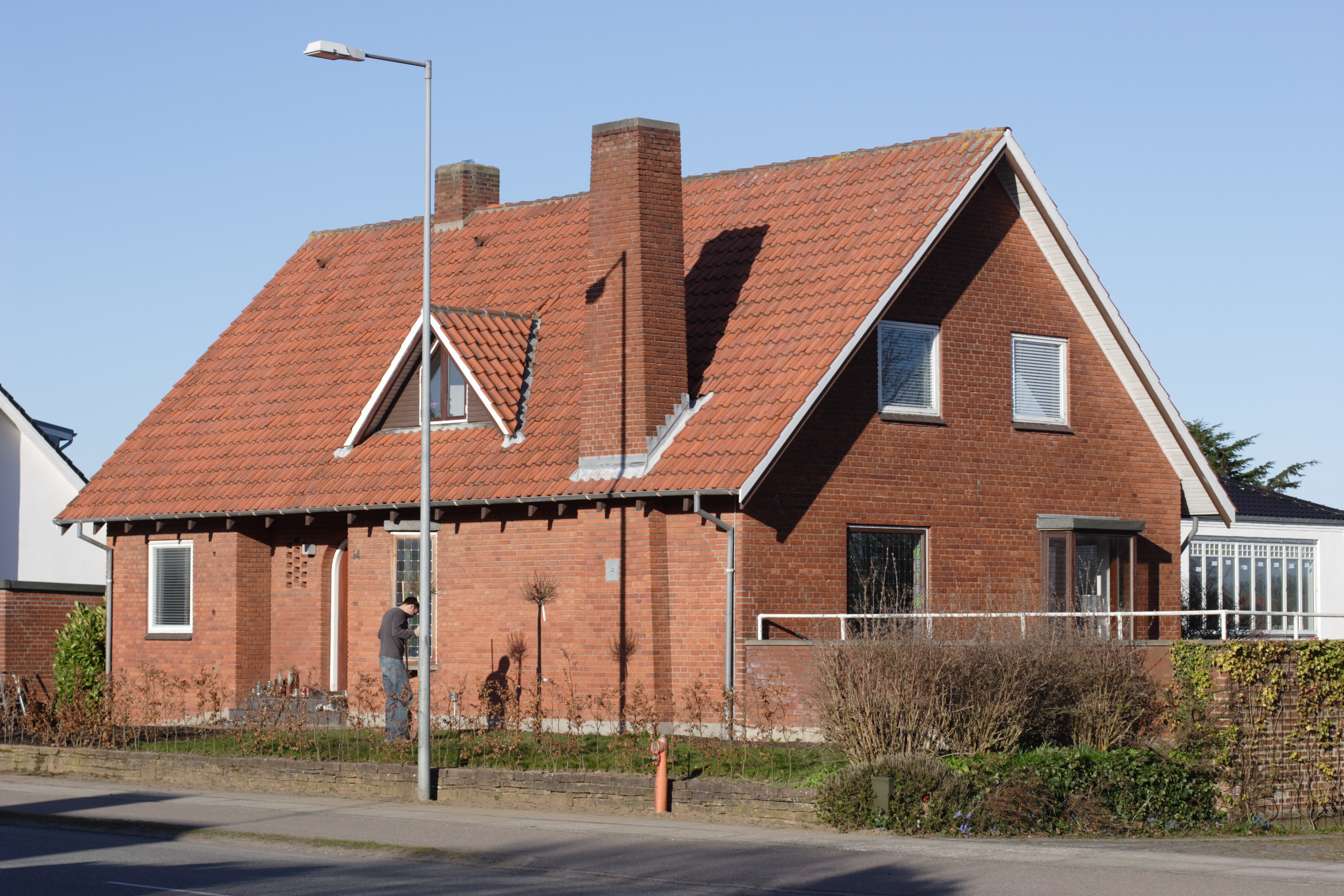
Larger parts of Risskov are residential areas with detached houses

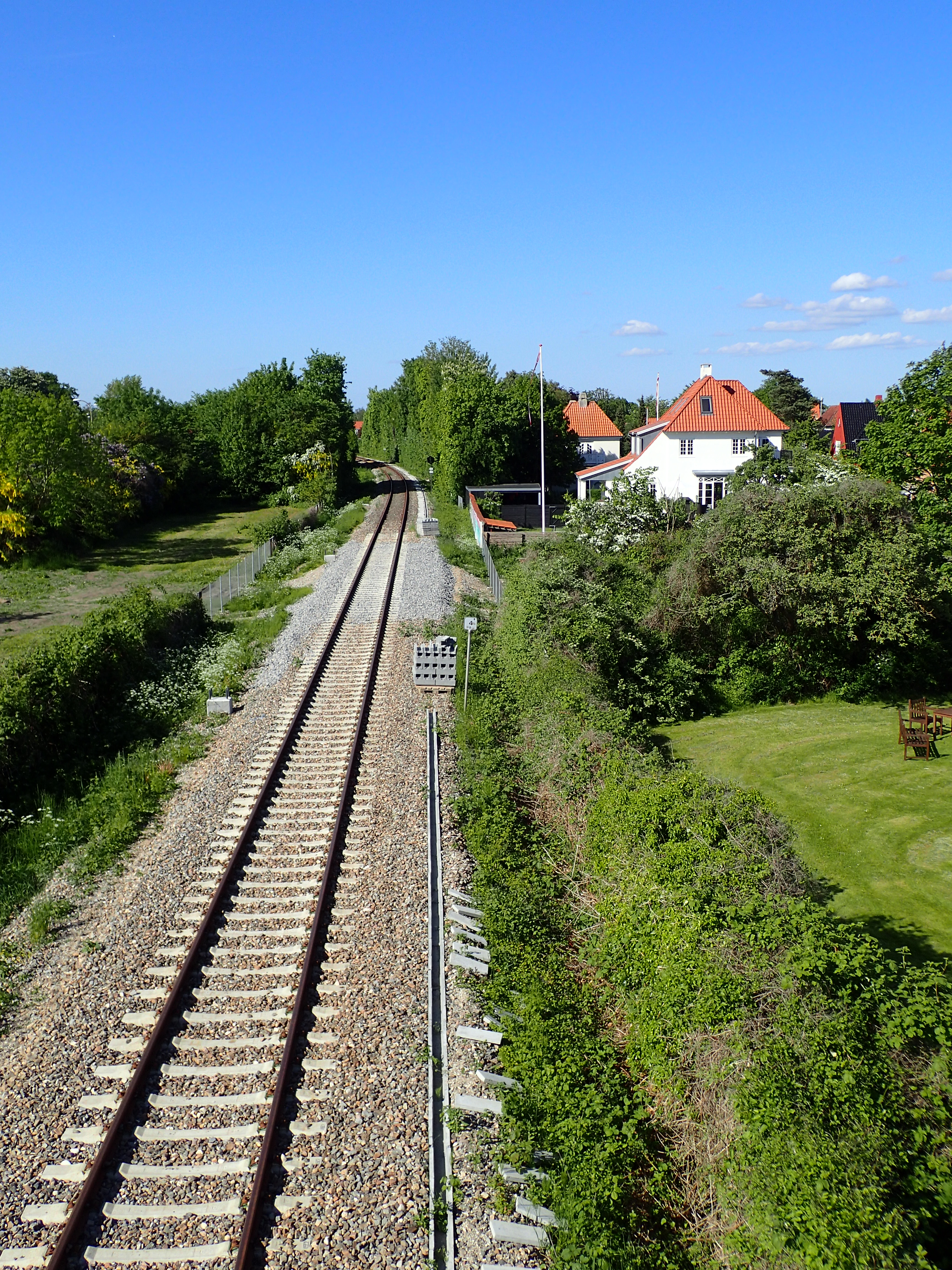
Aarhus Lightrail

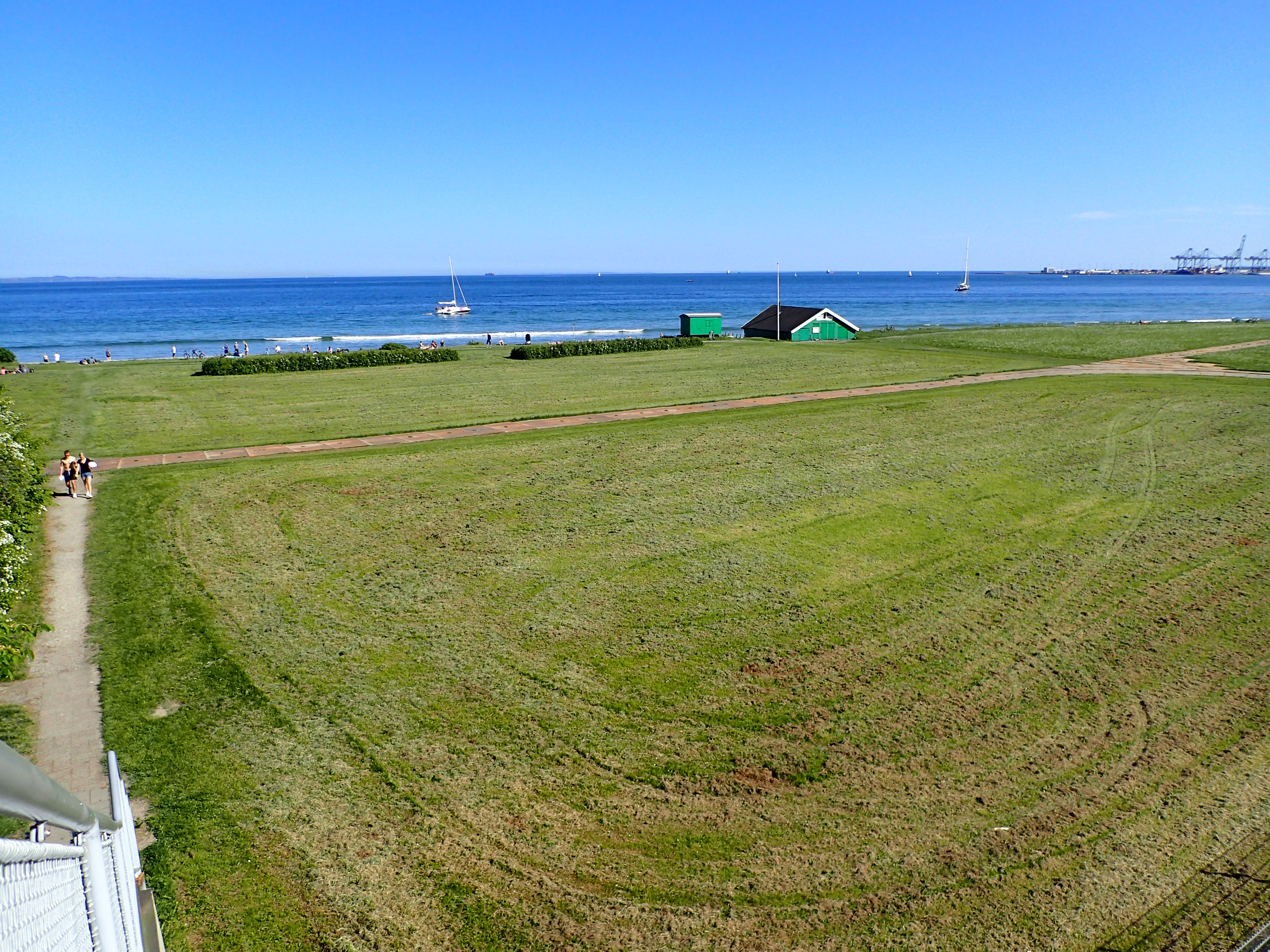
Risskov Beachpark

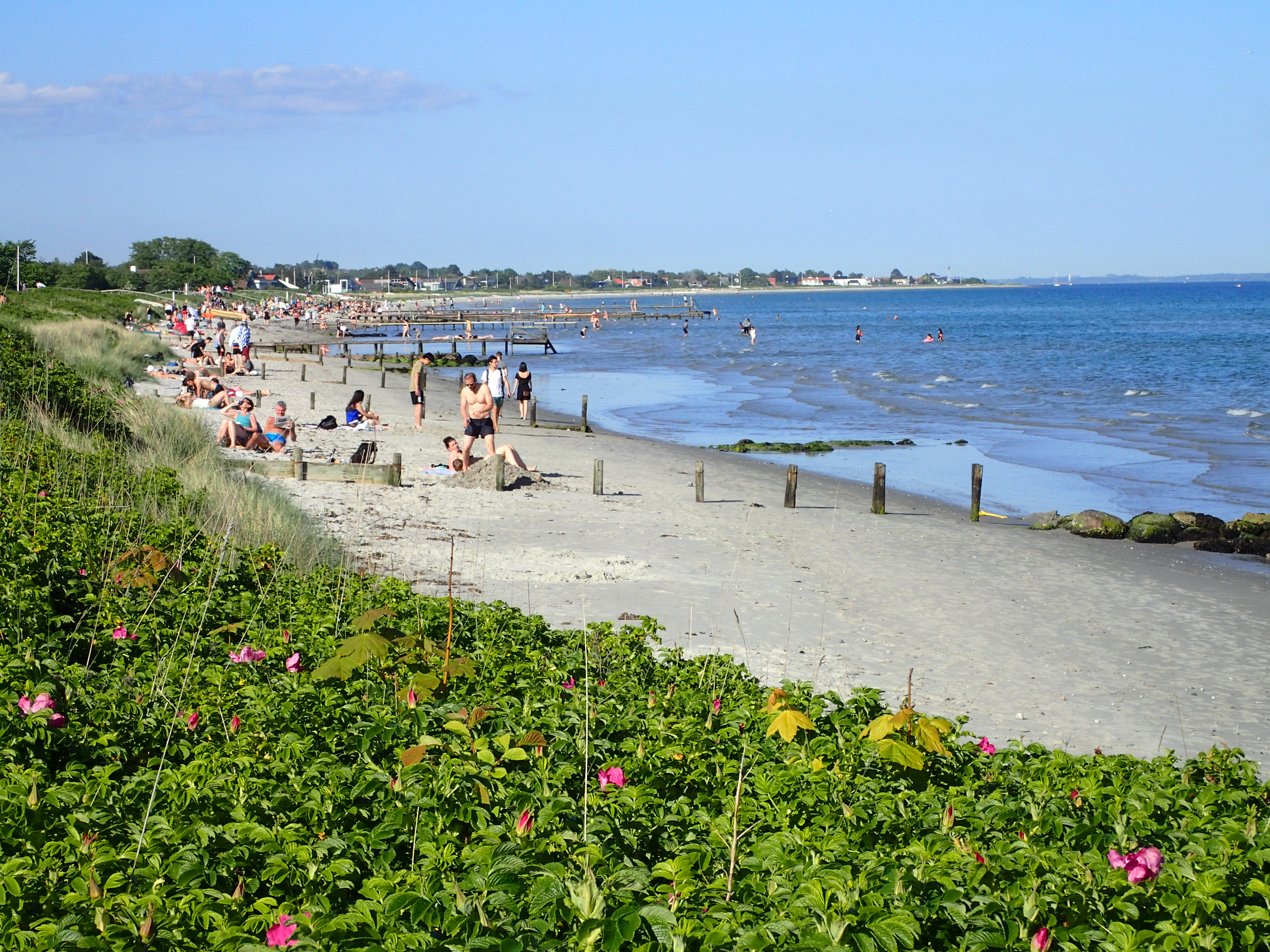
Bellevue Beachpark

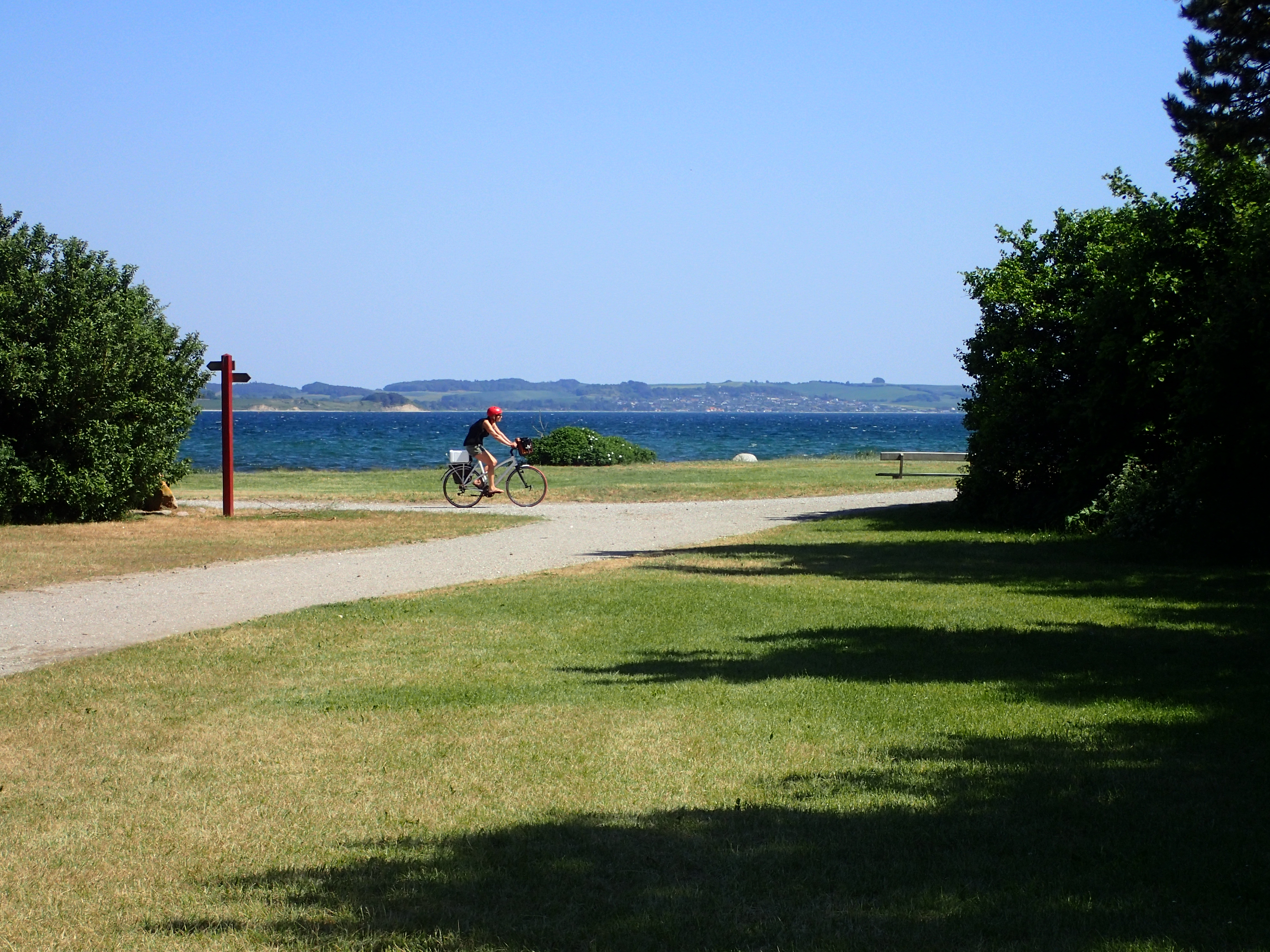
Åkrogen, southern section

== Literature ==
Writer Svend Aage Madsen has written many stories about Aarhus and Risskov, where he himself resides. Writer and performer Jens Blendstrup grew up in Risskov, and some of his stories are set in this particular neighbourhood. Blendstrup's childhood memoirs (with fictional elements) from Risskov appears in his novel "Gud taler ud" (God speaks up), which was turned into a screenplay and movie of the same name in 2017.
