= Aarhus (meteorite) =

Meteorite found in Denmark

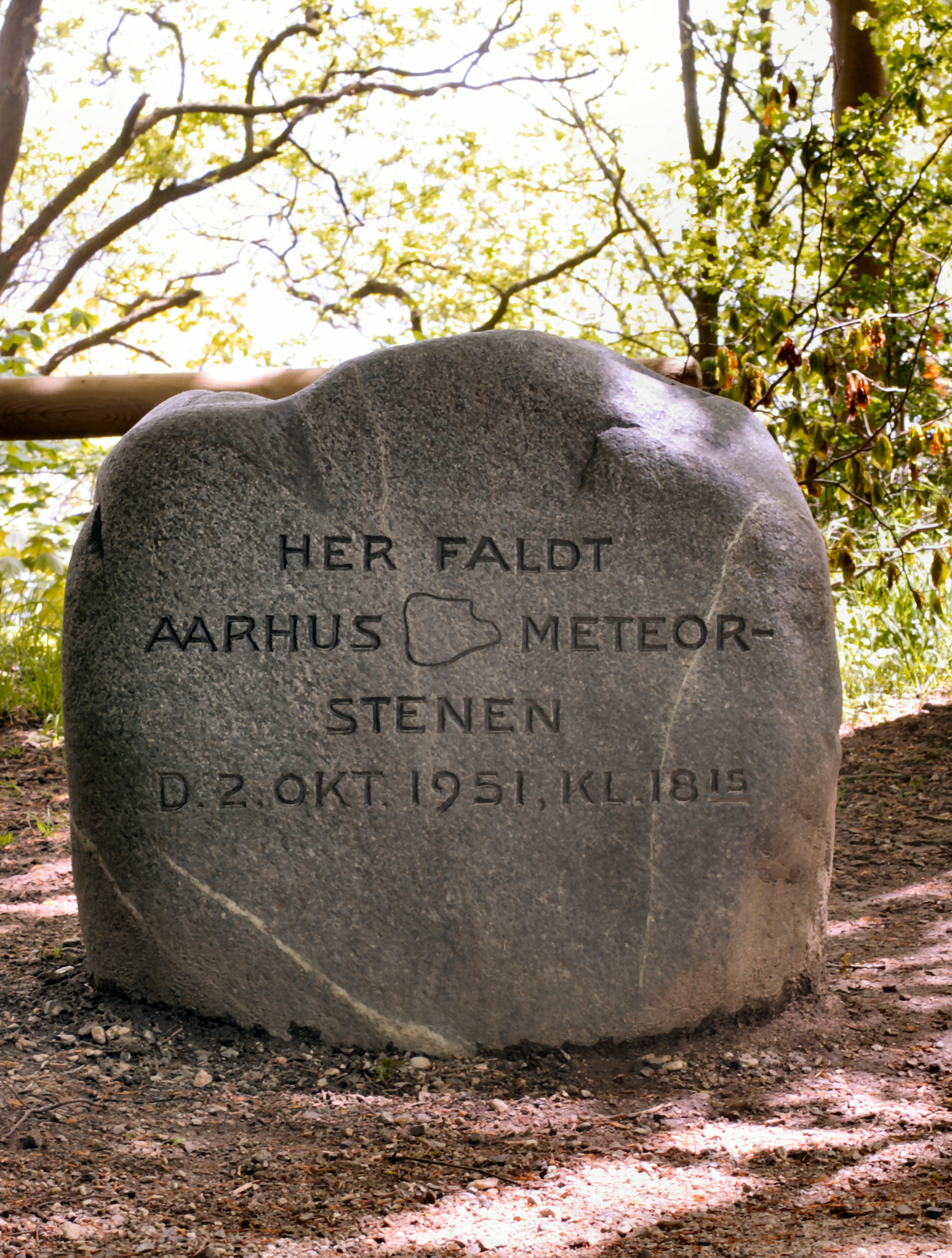
- Memorial stone for the 300 g part found in Riis Skov. The contours of this piece are depicted.
- Type: Chondrite
- Class: Ordinary chondrite
- Group: H6
- Country: Denmark
- Region: Region Midtjylland
- Coordinates: 56°11′N 10°14′E
- Observed fall: Yes
- Fall date: 2 October 1951
- Found date: 2 October 1951
- TKW: 720g (300g and 420g)

Aarhus is an H chondrite meteorite that fell to earth on 2 October 1951 at 18:15 in Aarhus, Denmark. The meteor split just before the otherwise undramatic impact and two pieces were recovered. They are known as Aarhus I (at 300g) and Aarhus II (at 420g). Aarhus I was found in the small woodland of Riis Skov, just a few minutes after impact.

== Classification ==
It is an H chondrite and belongs to the petrologic type 6, so it was assigned to the H6 group.

== See also ==
- Glossary of meteoritics
- Meteorite falls
- Ordinary chondrite

== Sources ==
- "Aarhus-meteoret" (PDF). StenoMusen 15 (in Danish). The Steno Museum. October 2001. pp. 4–5.
