= Riis Skov =

Forest and park in Århus, Denmark

Coordinates: 56°10′40″N 10°13′30″E

The Forest of Riis Riis Skov
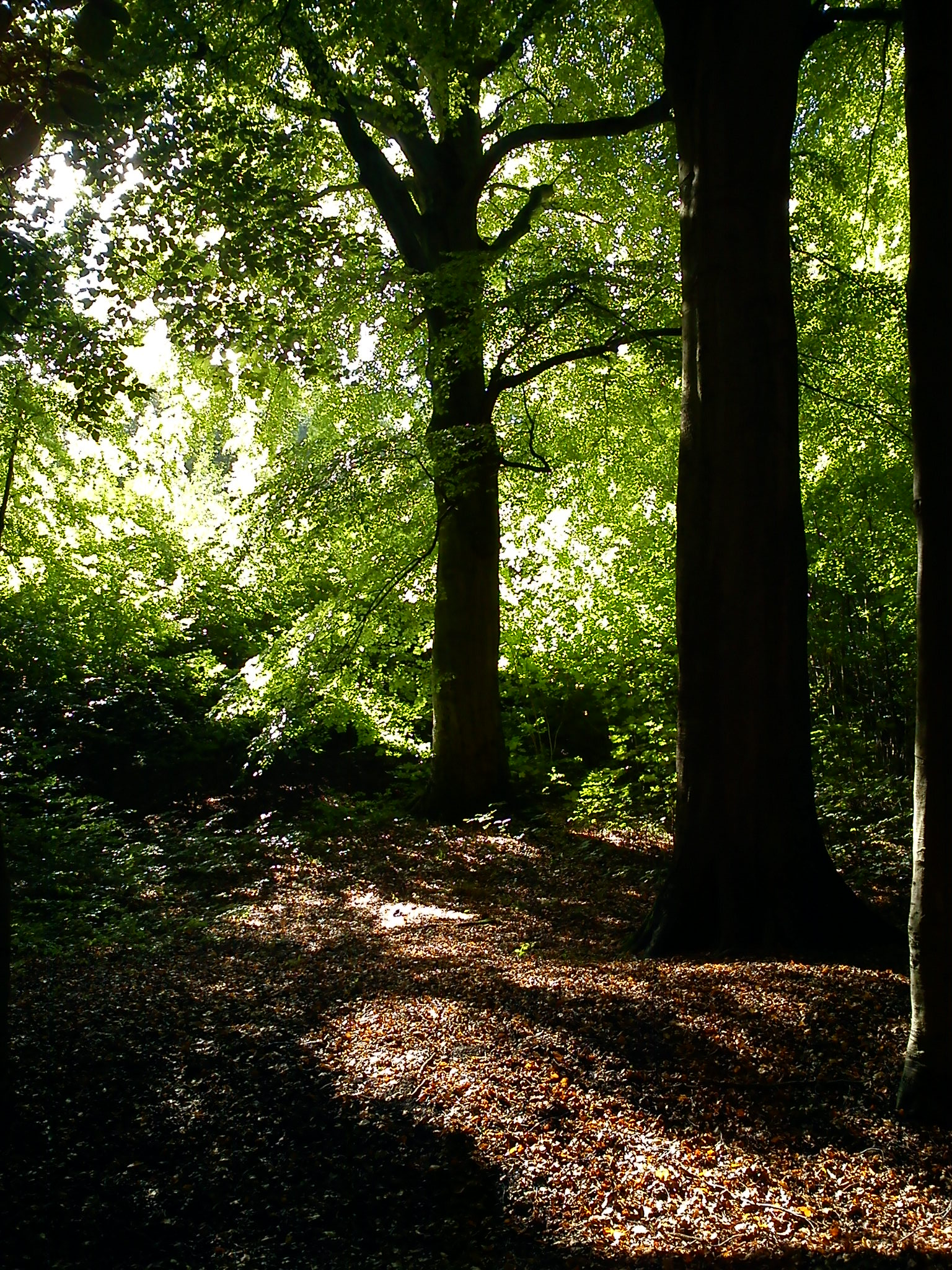
- Typical scenery in the beech forest of Riis Skov.
- Interactive map of The Forest of Riis

Geography
- Location: Aarhus, Risskov, Denmark
- Area: 0.8 km^{2} (0.31 sq mi)

Administration
- Authority: Aarhus Municipality

Ecology
- WWF Classification: Baltic mixed forests

Riis Skov (Riis' Forest or The Forest of Riis) is a forest and park in Århus, Denmark. It is located south of the district of Risskov, along the Bay of Aarhus.

== History ==
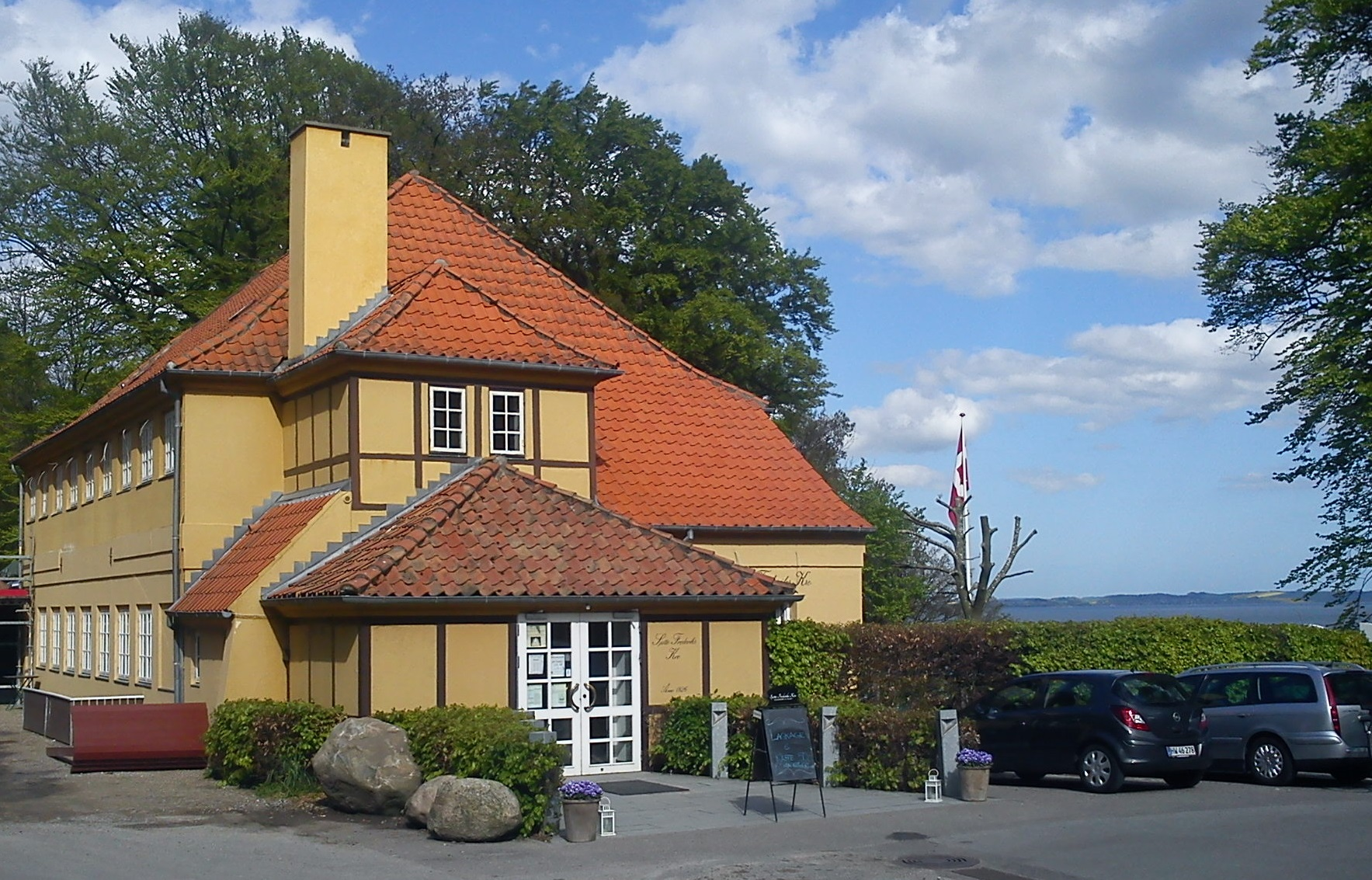
The restaurant Sjette Frederiks Kro (1825). Riis Skov has a long history of recreational activities.

This small patch of forest, was formally presented to Aarhus in 1395, by Queen Margaret I. Riis Skov was the first public forest in Denmark, where forests traditionally were owned and managed by the royal family or the nobility and in some cases ordinary farmers. Timber and firewood were very important resources in former times, needed for shipbuilding, house construction and various other important structures, or simply for heating and cooking. Although Riis Skov was a public forest, there was still active forestry going on until around the year 1800, when the large oaks were cut and used for quay-building in the Aarhus harbour. A few of them are still left, as some of the oldest trees in the forest. The forestry aspect gradually diminished and Riis Skov was increasingly viewed as a recreational area by the citizens.

On the evening of October 2, 1951, at 18:15, a meteorite exploded above Aarhus and one of two pieces was recovered in Riis Skov, just a few minutes after impact. A memorial stone commemorates the event.

=== Recreation ===
Riis Skov has a long cultural history as a recreational area for Aarhus and its citizens and several buildings in the forest still stands as witnesses; the public sea-bath Den Permanente from 1933, the inn of Sjette Frederiks Kro (named after King Frederik VI) from 1825, Aarhus Citizens Shooting Associations headquarters from 1881 and the old Dancing Pavillon from 1869, now a hostel. The forest is a protected area and the commercial forestry activities are limited nowadays.

== Nature ==
The forest is largely dominated by beech, but with oak, larch, maple, ash and birch mixed in at some places. Although beech is dominant, Riis Skov is not a natural beech forest and new trees are planted occasionally to replenish the old growth.

As a curiosity, the forest floor of Riis Skov is covered by ramsons in the spring. It is said, that this culinary plant was brought here by camping Spanish soldiers during the Napoleonic wars. While Spanish soldiers indeed camped in Aarhus, ramson have been growing in Denmark since the last glacial period and it might have been here in Riis Skov since the 13th century, before the Spaniards came along.

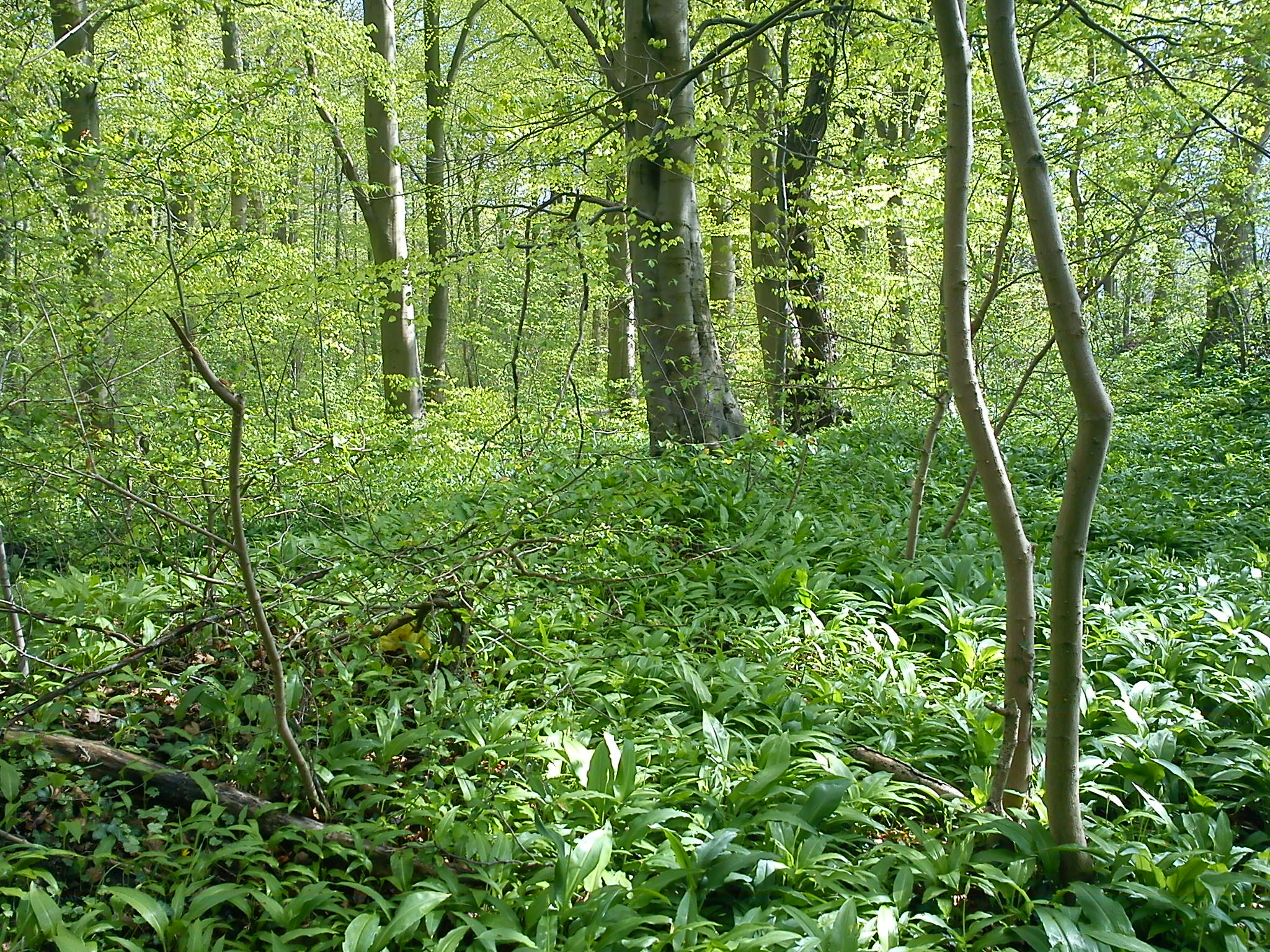
In spring, the forest floor is completely covered by ramson.

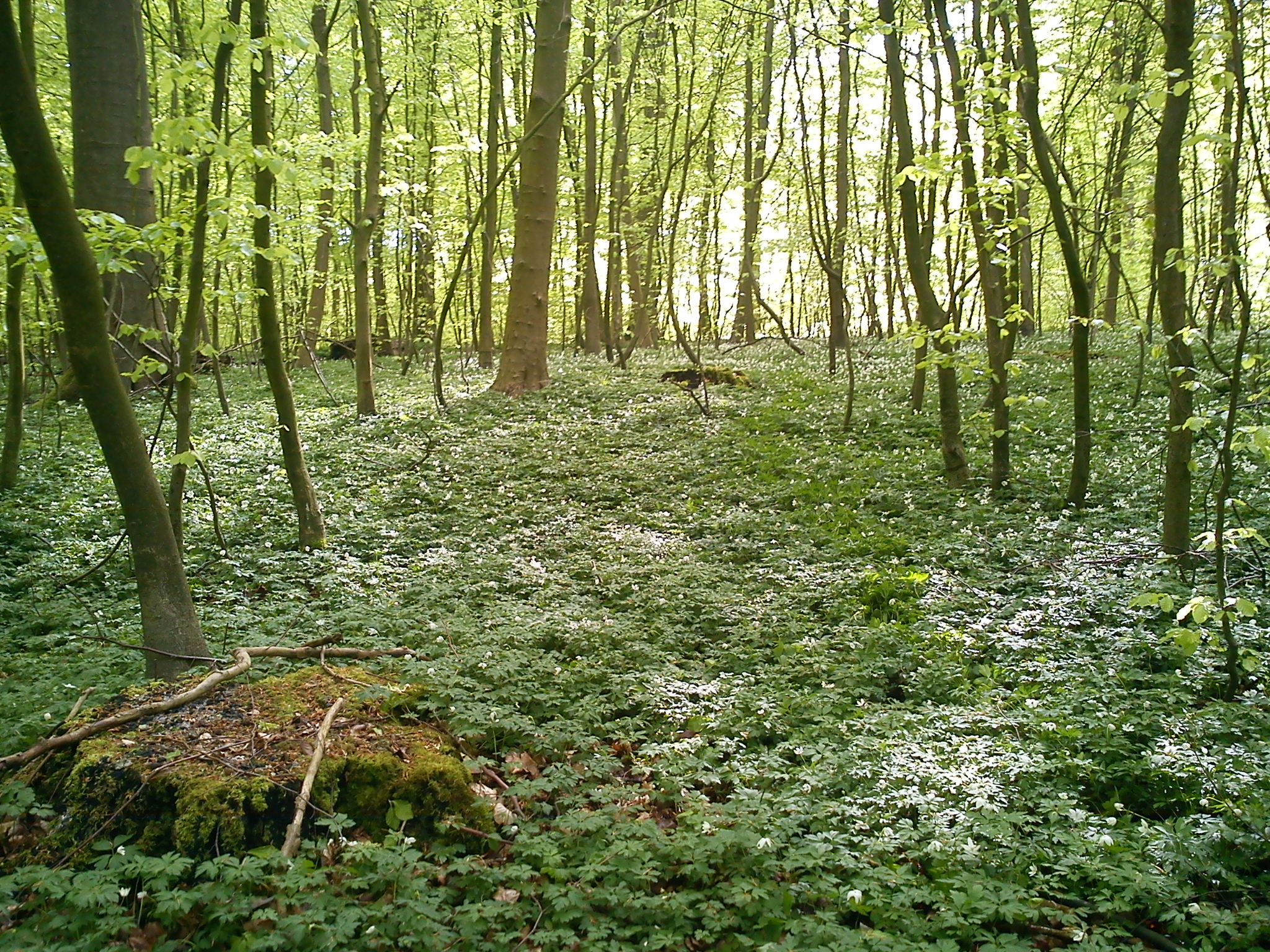
A few rare spots are dominated by wood anemones (Anemone nemorosa) instead of ramsons.

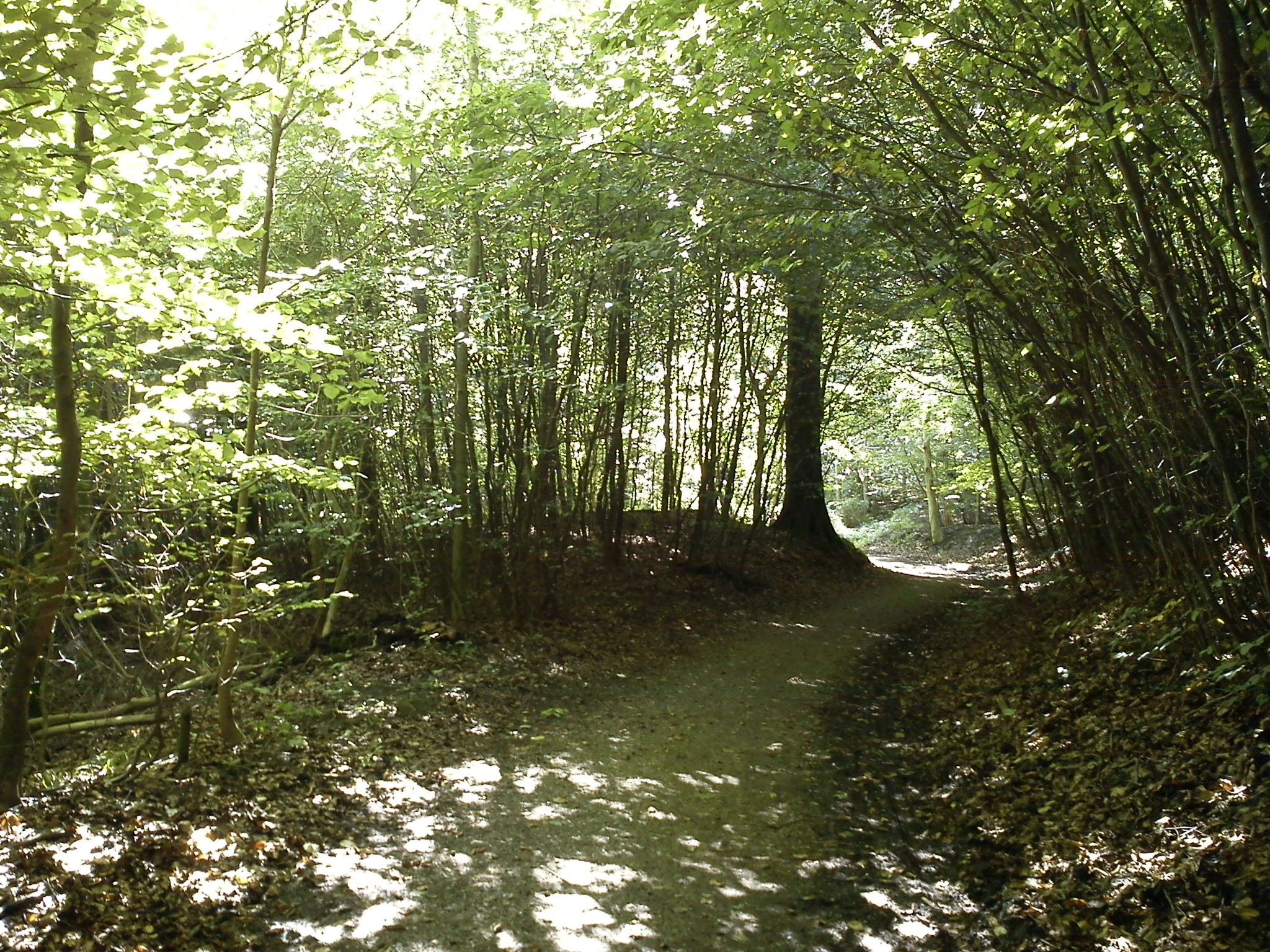
Footpaths crisscross the forest.

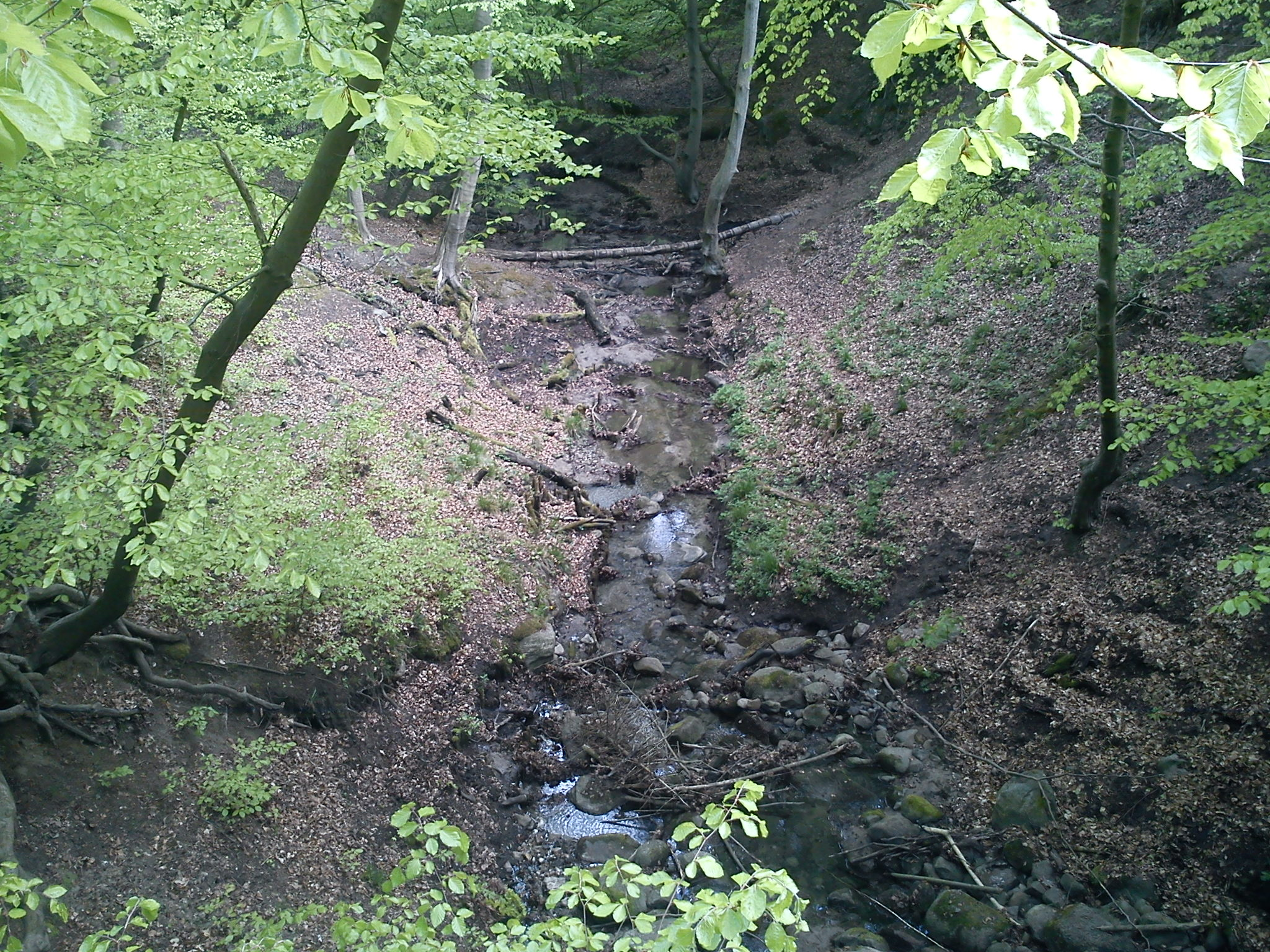
Riisgaards Bæk, a small stream at the bottom of a broad gully.

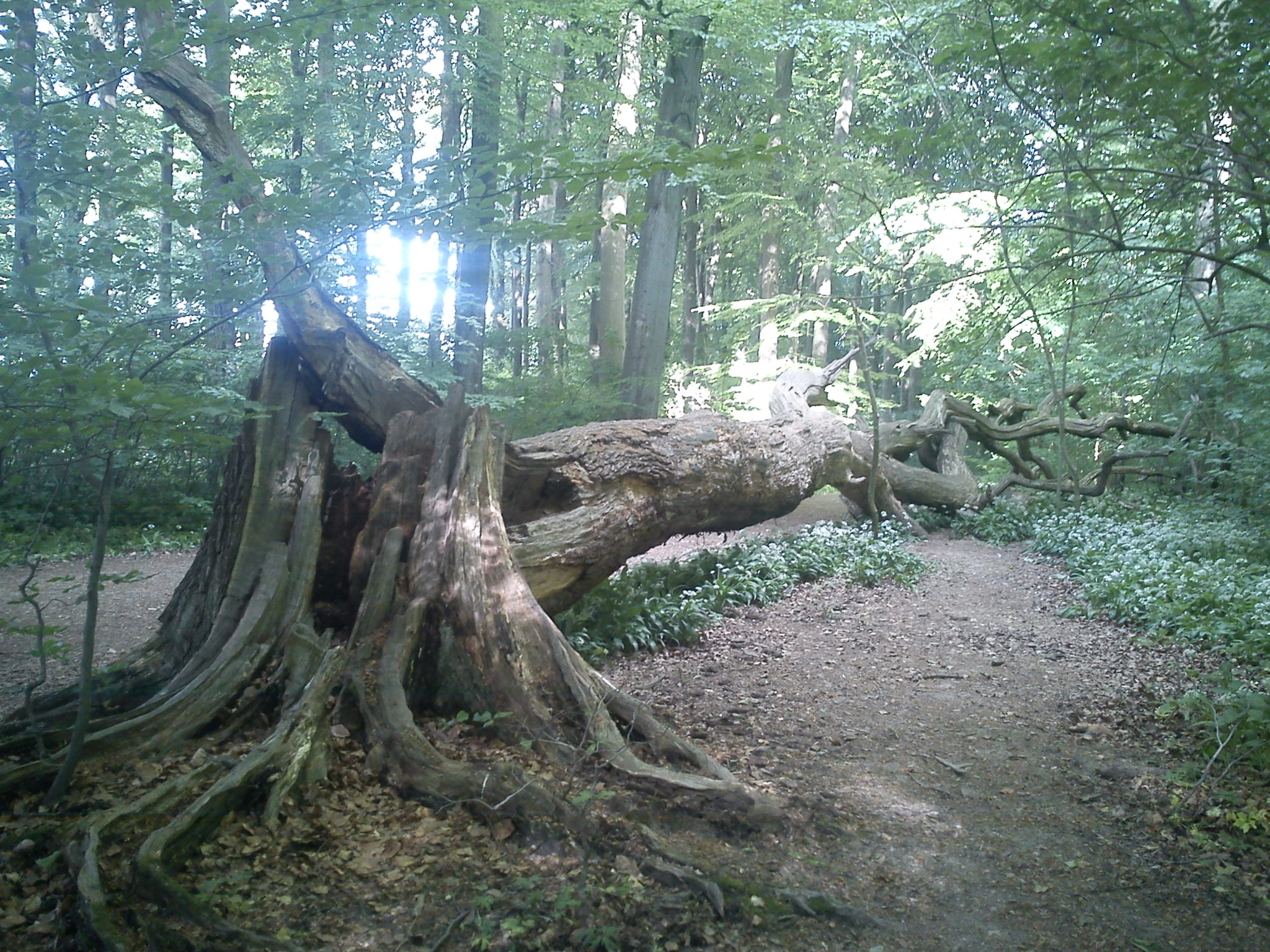
Fallen trees are often left to decay in order to increase and sustain the biodiversity.

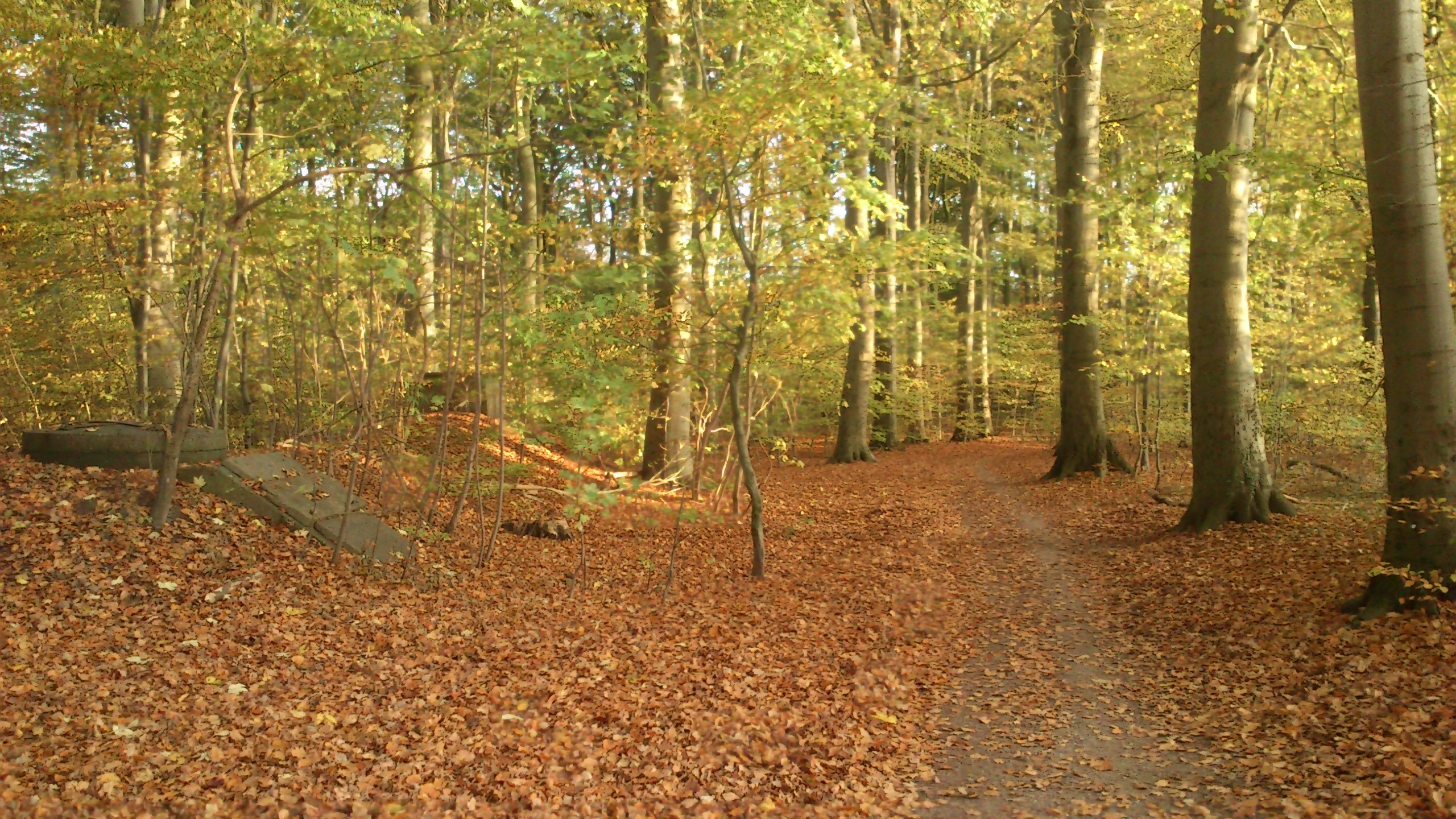
Leaffall brings out the colours. The forest is dotted with concrete air-raid shelters from WW II.

== Sources ==
- Helge Daus (2010): "Riis Skov - Europas mest besøgte skov" Forfatterforlaget ATTIKA, ISBN 9788775287666 (in Danish)
- Excursions in Riis Skov (pdf) Aarhus Municipality (Naturemanagement) (2004) (in Danish)
