= Danish National Cycle Route 5 =

Cycle route in Denmark

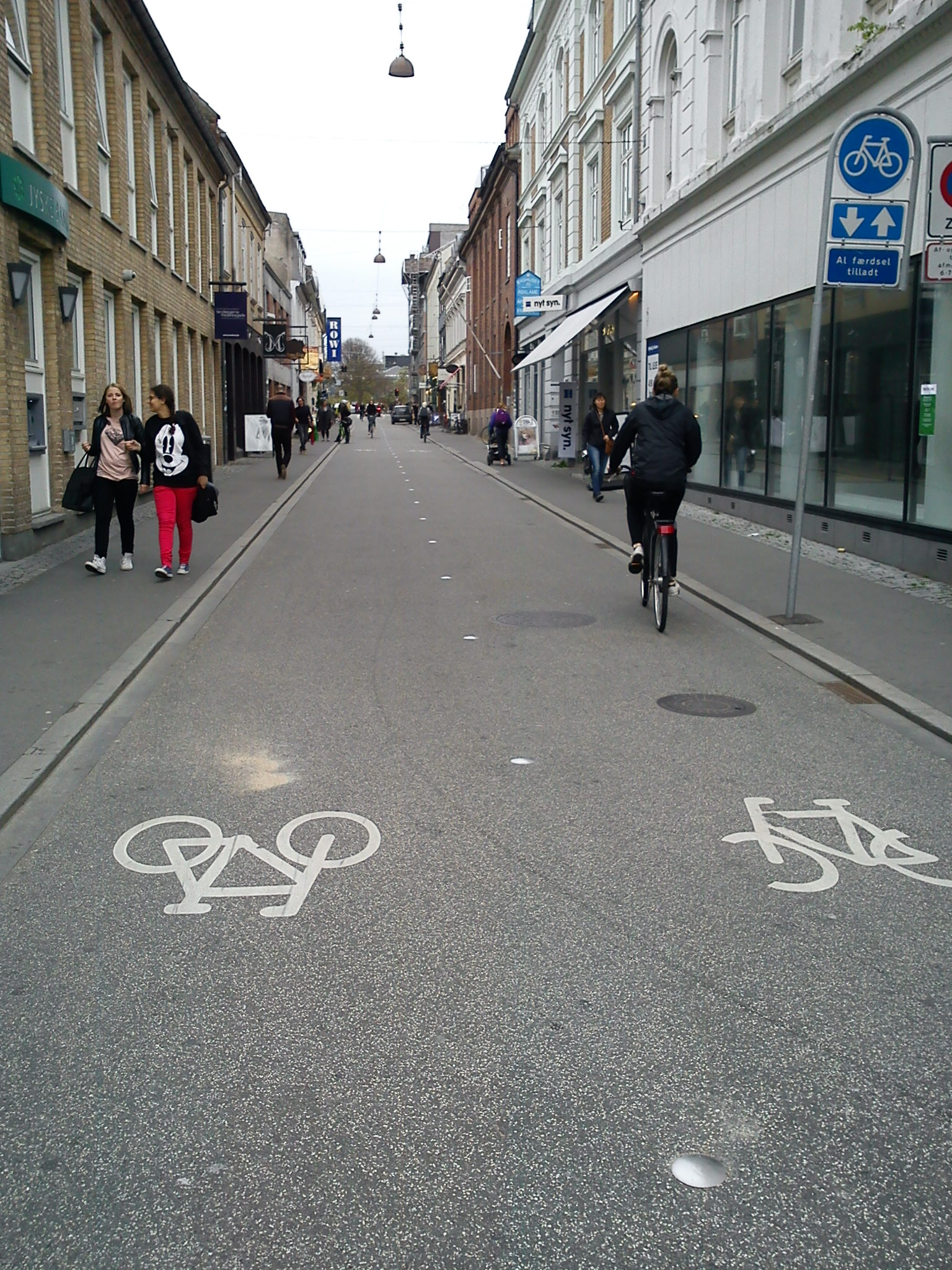
Frederiksgade in Aarhus is a part of the route

Danish national cycle route 5, known as the Østkystruten (East Coast Route), is the fifth of the 11 Danish National Cycle Routes. It runs from Sønderborg in Southern Jutland to Skagen, the northernmost tip of Jutland in the Northern Jutland region. It follows the east coast of Jutland and is 650 km (400 mi) long, with 90% of this distance being along paved roads.

== Towns on the route ==
1	Sønderborg
2	Aabenraa
3	Haderslev
4	Kolding
5	Fredericia
6	Vejle
7	Horsens
8	Aarhus
9	Ebeltoft
10	Grenå
11	Hadsund
12	Frederikshavn

== See also ==
- Danish National Cycle Routes
