= List of educational institutions in Aarhus =

This list of educational institutions in Aarhus is a list of educational institutions in the city of Aarhus in Denmark. including primary, secondary and higher educational institutions.

== Higher education ==
- Aarhus University
- Aarhus School of Architecture
- Aarhus School of Marine and Technical Engineering
- Business Academy Aarhus
- Jutland Art Academy
- Royal Academy of Music, Aarhus/Aalborg
- School of Media and Journalism
- VIA University College, main headquarters plus Campus Aarhus C and Campus Aarhus N

== Secondary education ==
- Egaa Gymnasium
- Langkær Gymnasium og HF
- Marselisborg Gymnasium
- Risskov Gymnasium
- Viby Gymnasium
- VUC Aarhus
- Aarhus Katedralskole
- Aarhus Business College
- Århus Statsgymnasium
- Aarhus Academy

Vocational

- Aarhus Educational Centre for Agriculture
- SOSU Aarhus
- Aarhus Tech

== Primary education ==
- Bakkegårdskolen
- Bavnehøj Skole
- Beder Skole
- Elev Skole
- Ellekærskolen
- Ellevangskolen
- Elsted Skole
- Engdalskolen
- Fjordsgades Skole
- Gammelgaardsskolen
- Hårup Skole
- Hasle Skole
- Højvangskolen
- Holme Skole
- Katrinebjergskolen
- Kragelundskolen
- Læssøesgades School
- Lisbjergskolen
- Lystrup Skole
- Malling Skole
- Mårslet Skole
- Møllevangskolen
- Næshøjskolen
- Risskov Skole
- Rosenvangskolen
- Rundhøjskolen
- Sabro-Korsvejskolen
- Samsøgades School
- Skåde Skole
- Skæring Skole
- Skjoldhøjskolen
- Skødstrup Skole
- Skovvangskolen
- Sødalskolen
- Solbjergskole
- Sølystskolen
- Søndervangskolen
- Strandskolen
- Tilst Skole
- Tovshøjskolen
- Tranbjergskolen
- Vestergårdsskolen
- Viby Skole
- Virupskolen
- Vorrevangskolen
- Åby Skole

Private and charter schools

- Børnenes Friskole
- Jakobskolen
- Selam Friskole
- Den Moderne Kulturelle Skole
- Laursens Realskole
- Skt. Knuds Skole
- Elise Smiths Skole
- Lykkeskolen
- Aarhus International School
- Egebakkeskolen
- N. Kochs Skole
- Aarhus Friskole
- Forældreskolen i Aarhus
- Nilen Privatskole
- Aarhus Privatskole
- Interskolen
- Rudolf Steiner-Skolen i Aarhus

Municipal specialty schools

- Heltidsundervisningen (HU) og Flexskolen
- Langagerskolen
- Center 10
- Kaløvigskolen
- Stensagerskolen
- Sygehusundervisningen

== Other ==
- Deaconal Folk High School
- KaosPilot
