= Skåde =

- Neighborhood
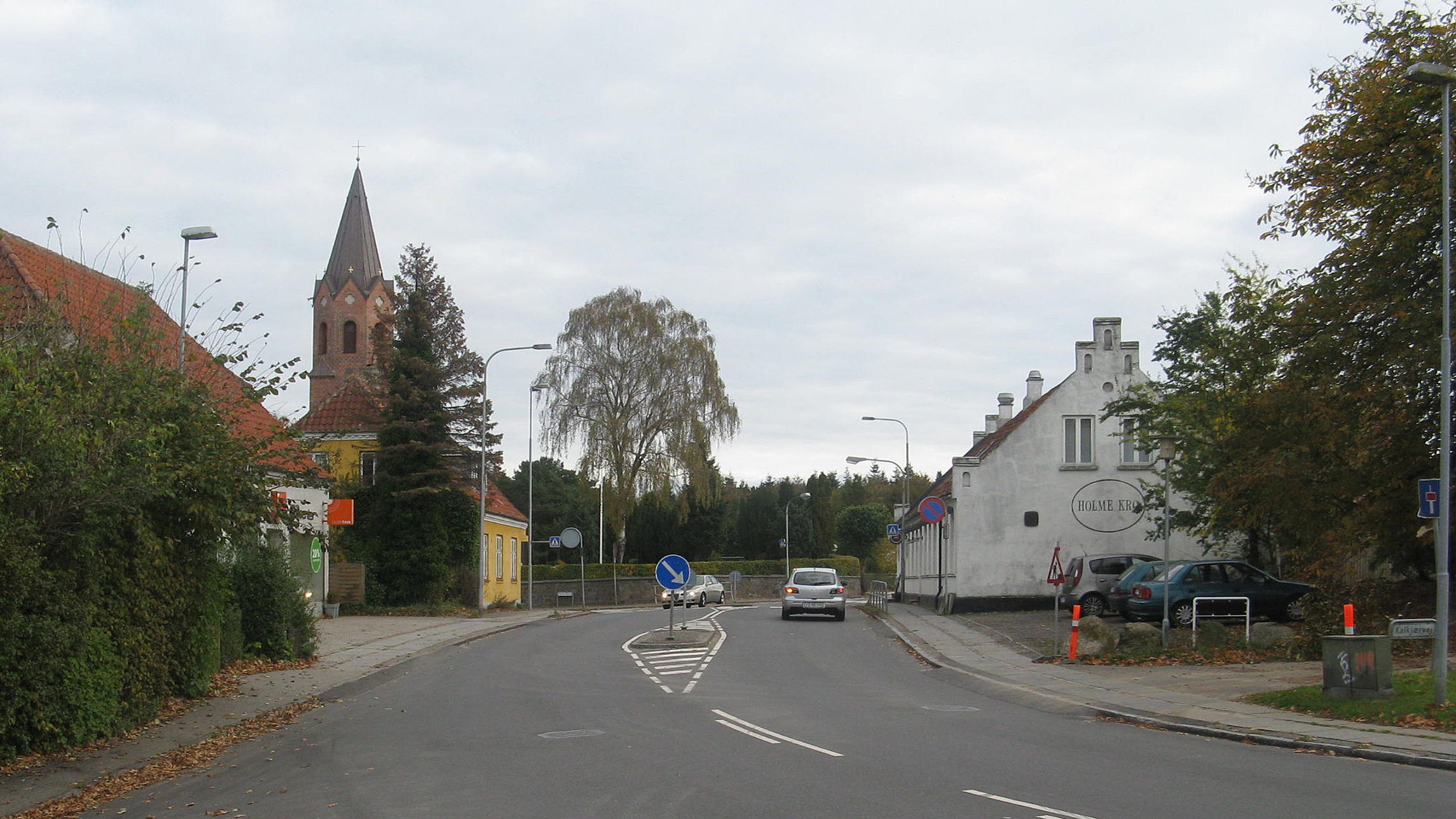

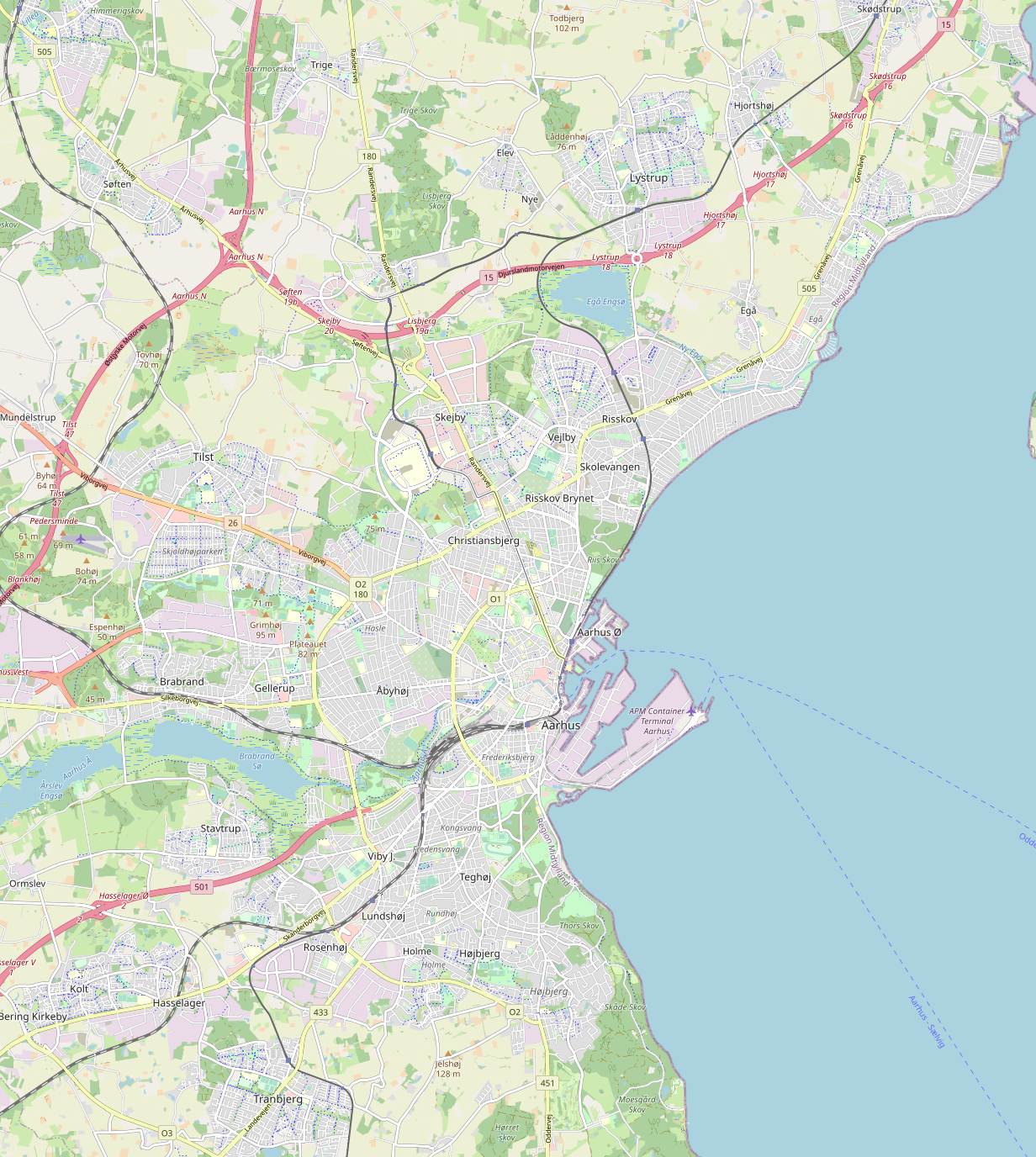
- Location within Aarhus
- Coordinates: 56.100036°N 10.201211°E
- Country: Kingdom of Denmark
- Regions of Denmark: Central Denmark Region
- Municipality: Aarhus Municipality
- District: Højbjerg
- Postal code: 8270

Skåde is a neighbourhood of Højbjerg, a southern district of Aarhus in Denmark. It is located 6 km south from the city centre.

Skåde is the highest lying area in Aarhus municipality, with hills like Jelshøj (128 metres) and Søsterhøj (112 metres).

== Description ==
The built up area of Skåde is almost exclusively residential, but the neighbourhood also comprise a larger part of the Marselisborg Forests, known as Skåde Skov. Skåde Skov includes the park like area of Hørhaven. The Moesgård estate is also situated in Skåde and comprise the Moesgård Manor, Moesgård Museum, the forest area of Moesgård Skov, and Moesgård beach.

Notable points of interest in Skåde includes:

- Skåde Bakker
  Larger affluent residential area with large mansions.
- Handelsfagskolen Kursuscenter
  Course center near Søsterhøj with vocational courses and training in the fields of trade and commerce.
  Notable brutalist architecture designed by Friis & Moltke in 1969.
- Aarhus Efterskole
  An efterskole since 1978.
- Diakonhøjskolen (Deaconal Folk High School)
- Skattecenter Aarhus
  Municipal tax centre.
- Søsterhøj
  A hilltop with a landmark radio and TV antenna.
- Jelshøj
  The highest hill in the municipality.
- Skåde Skov
  Part of the Marselisborg Forests.
- Hørhaven
  A park like area of Skåde Skov.
- Moesgård Museum
- Moesgård Manor
- Moesgård Forest Mill
- Moesgård Beach
  Popular destination in the summer.

== History ==
Skåde was originally a small village in the Aarhus countryside, but has now merged with the city. The administrative division of Skåde has been enlarged several times since the late 1800s.

== Gallery ==
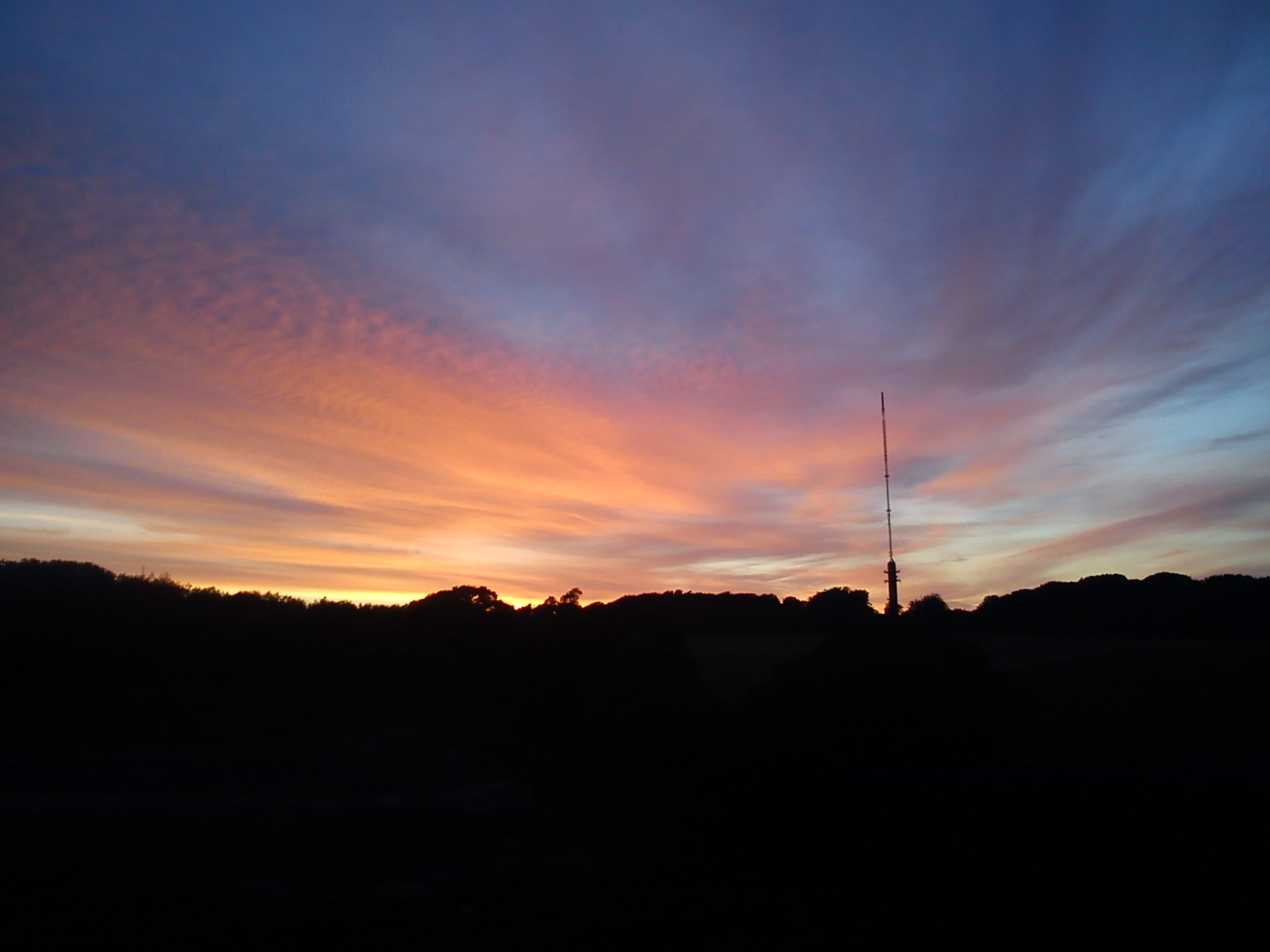
Telecommunication Tower Aarhus at Søsterhøj, a landmark that can be seen from all over Aarhus.

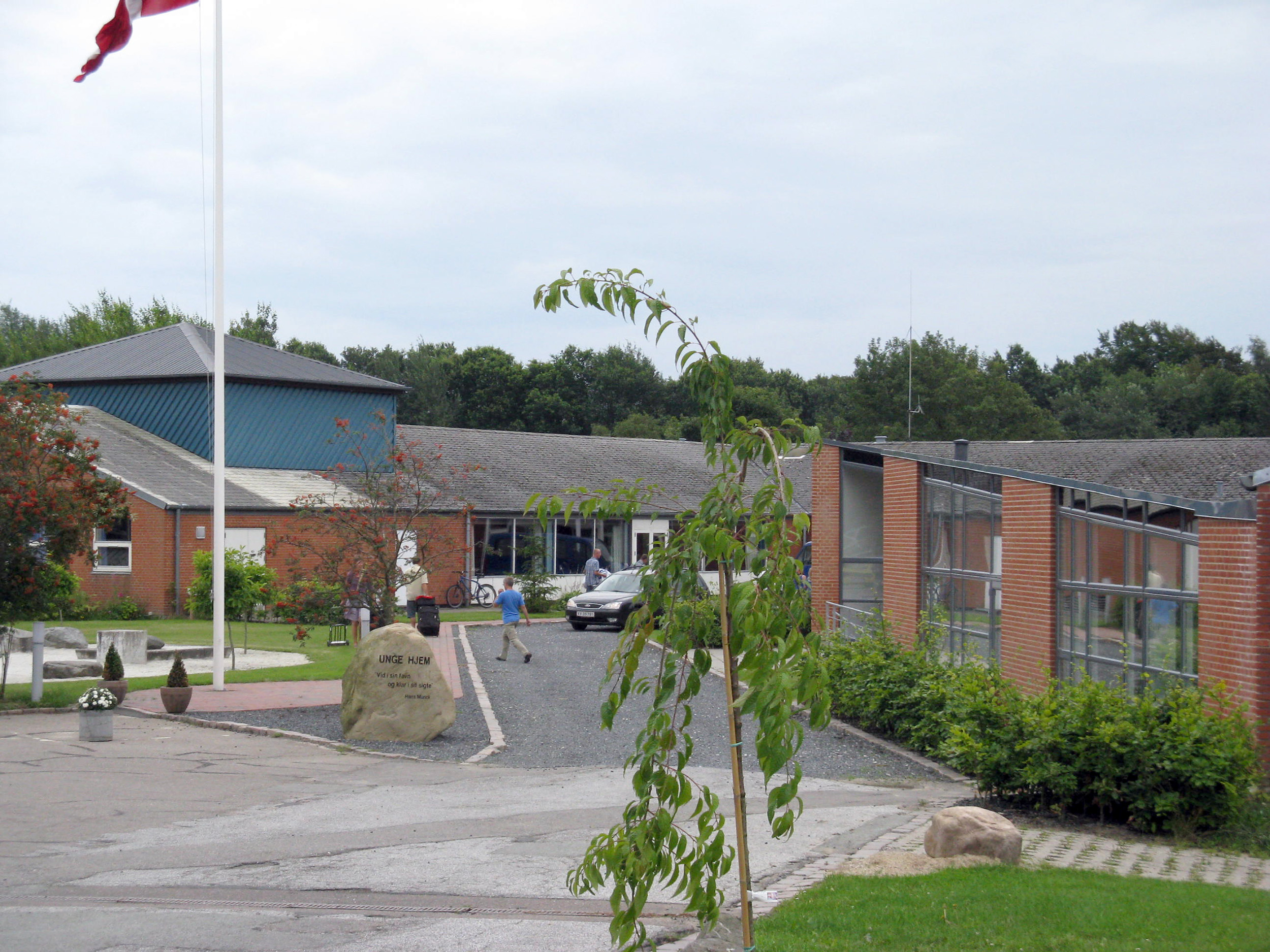
Aarhus Efterskole.

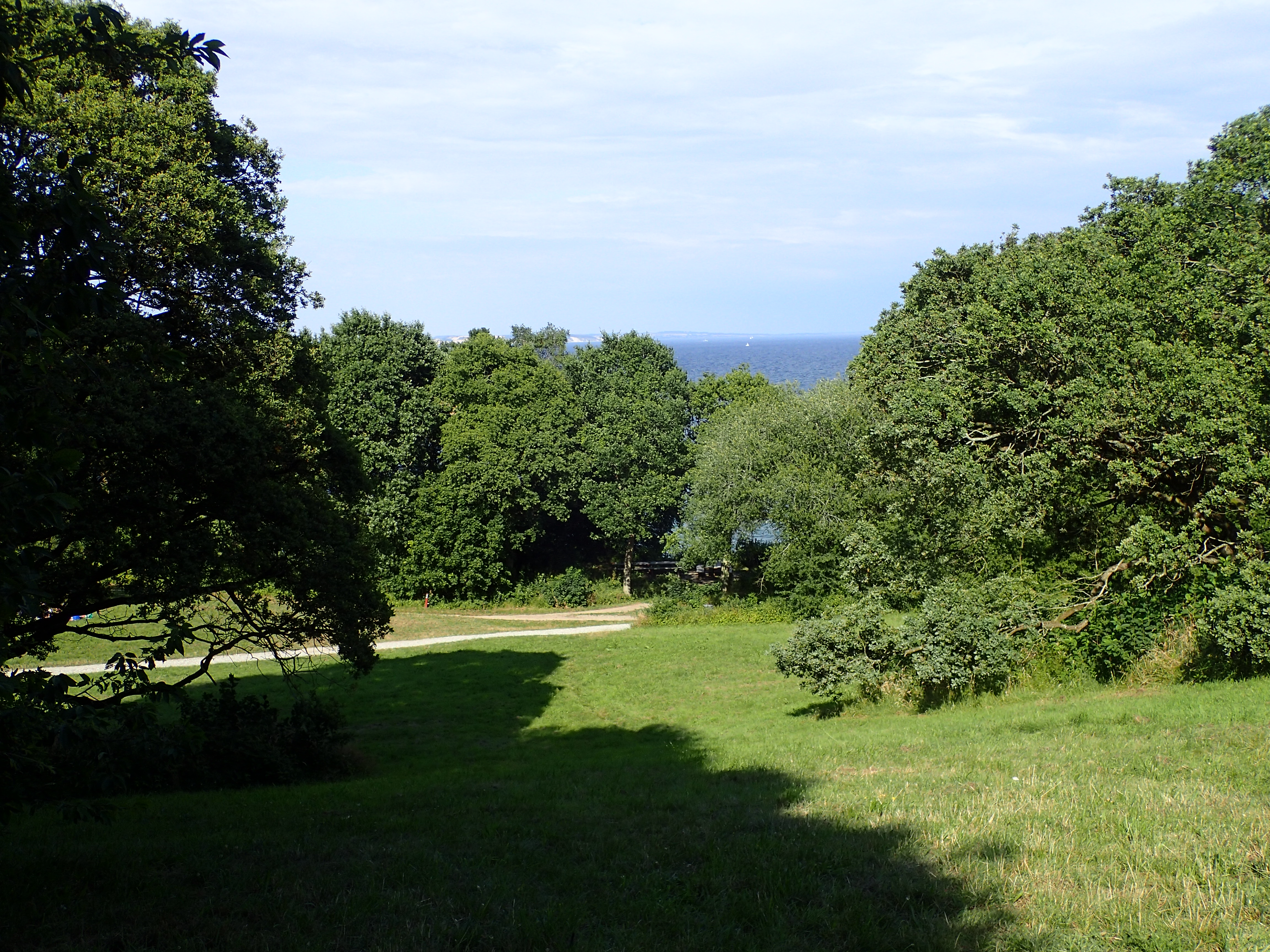
Hørhaven

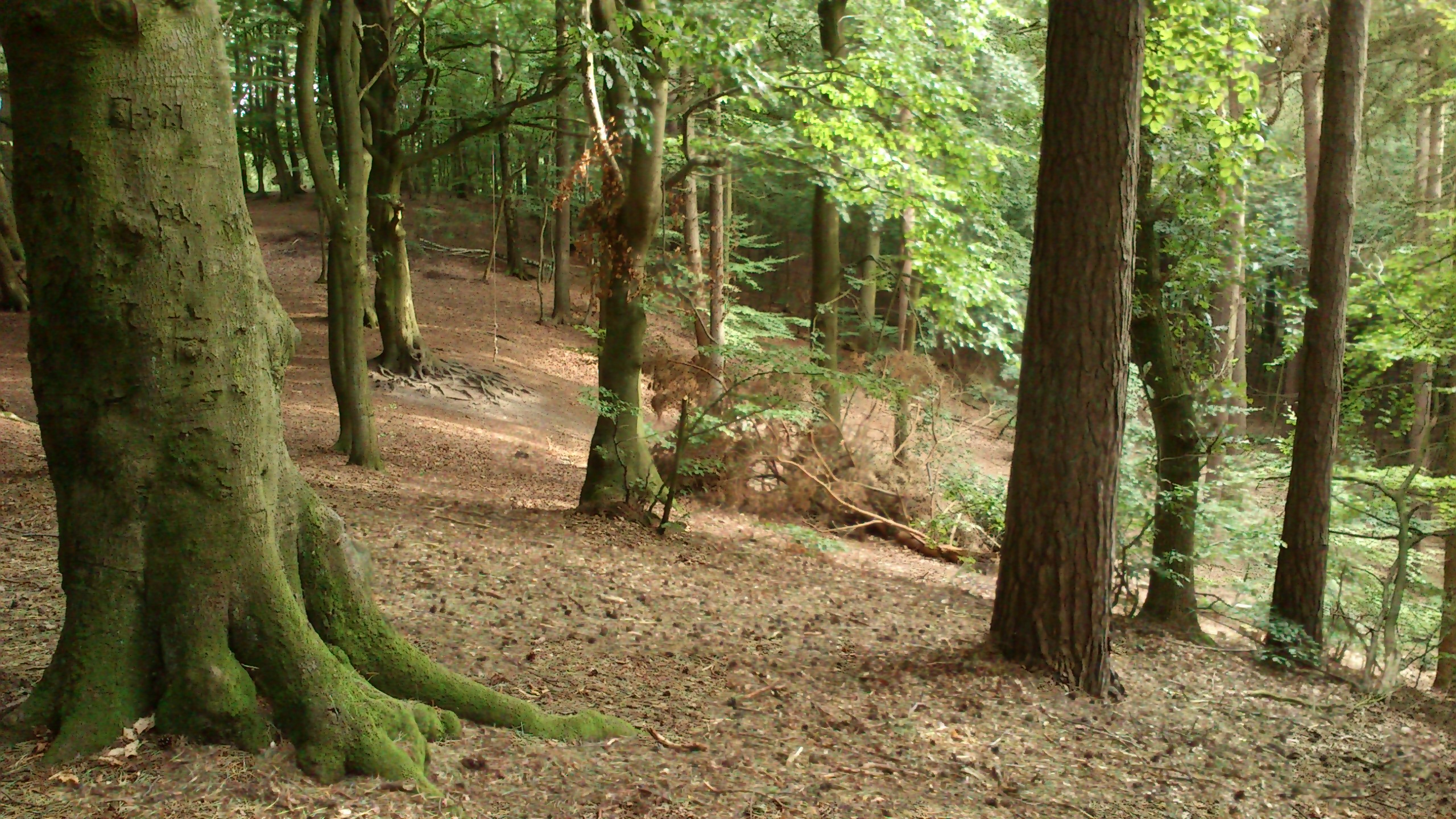
Scene from Skåde Skov.

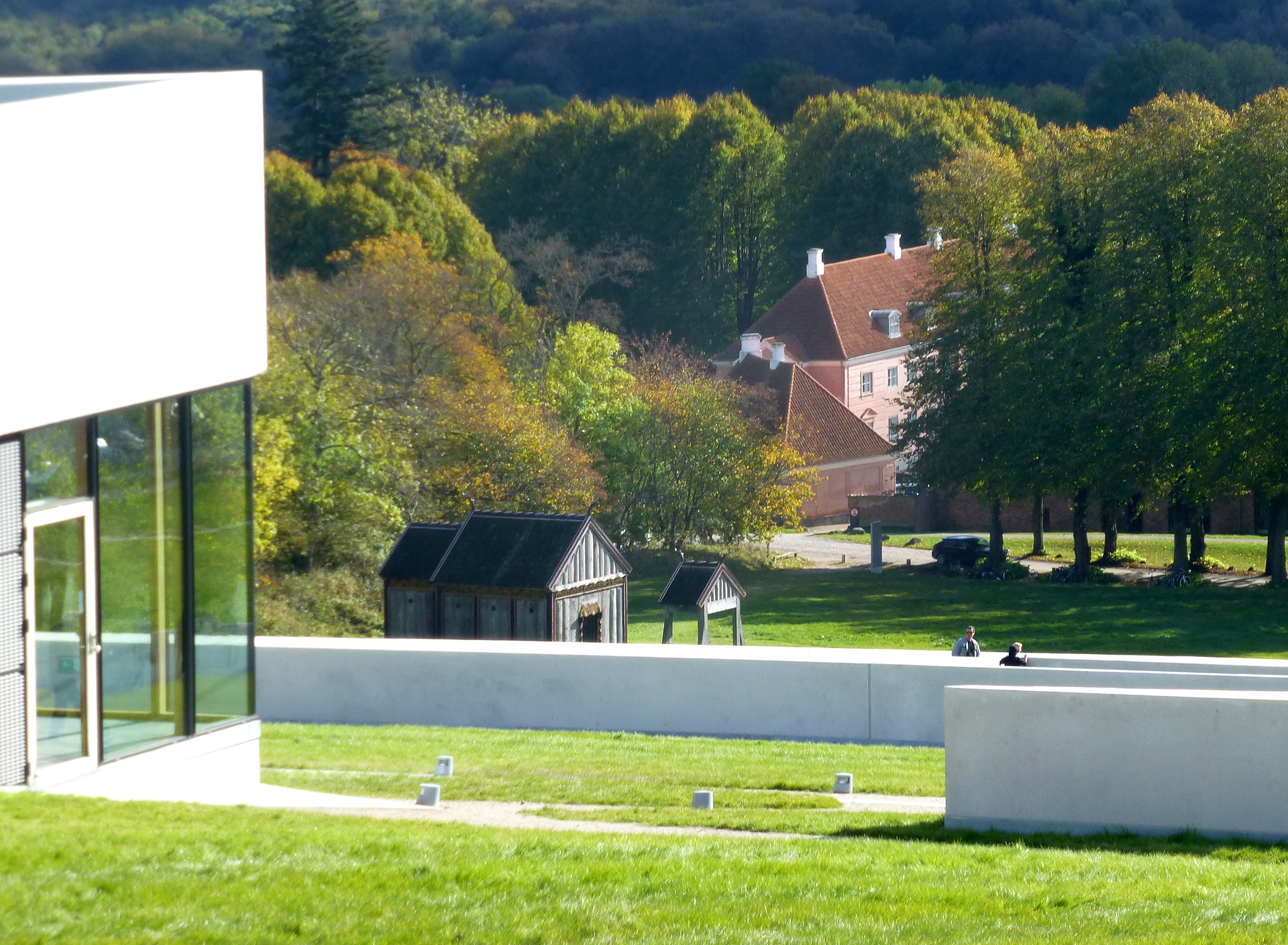
Moesgård Museum, view across the Moesgård estate.

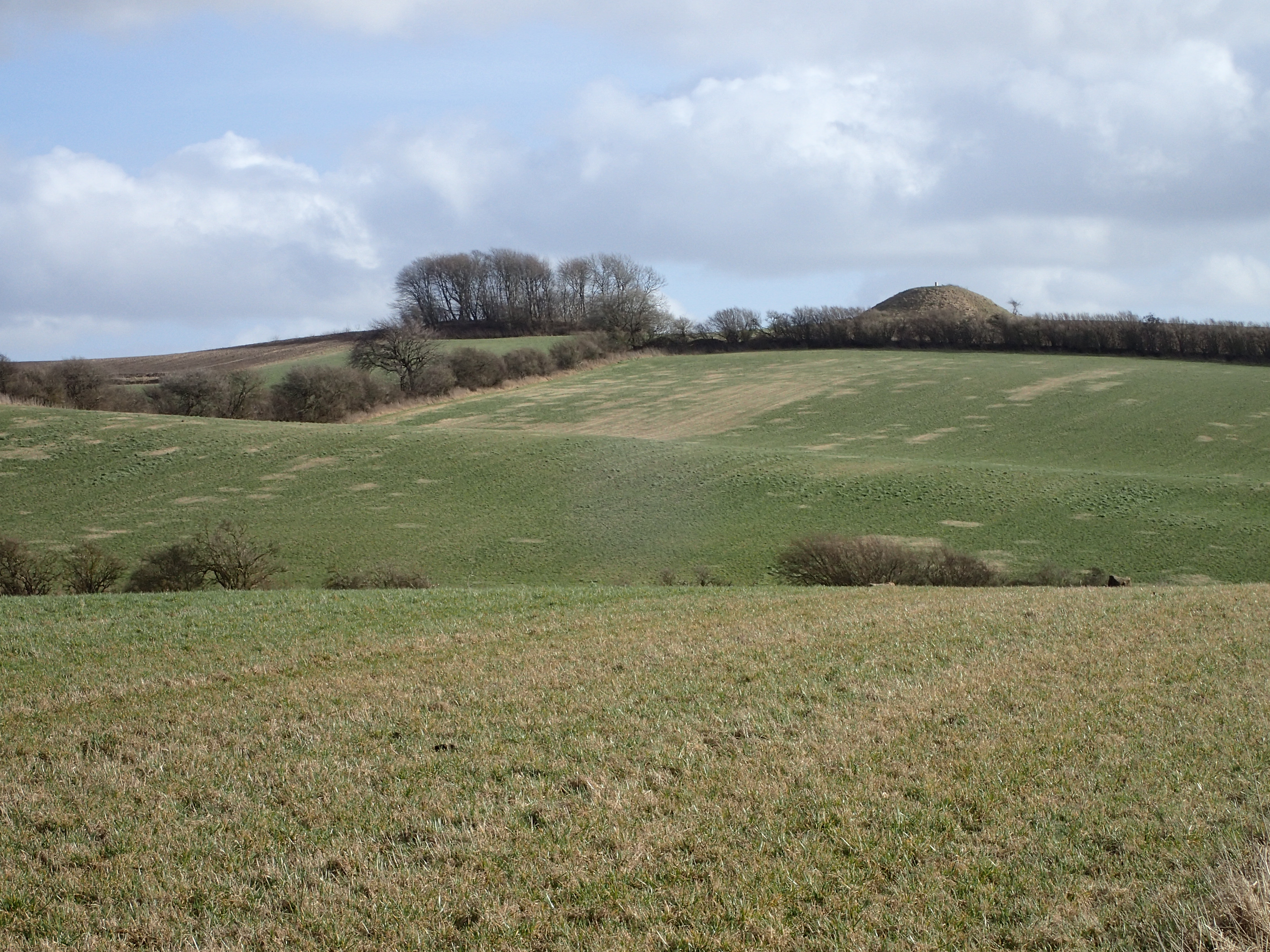
Jelshøj, the highest hill in Aarhus Municipality.

== Sources ==
- Højbjerg Holme Lokalhistoriske Arkiv Archive on local history (in Danish)
