= Telecommunication Tower Aarhus =

Transmission tower in Aarhus, Denmark

Coordinates: 56°05′55″N 10°13′01″E

Telecommunication Tower Aarhus
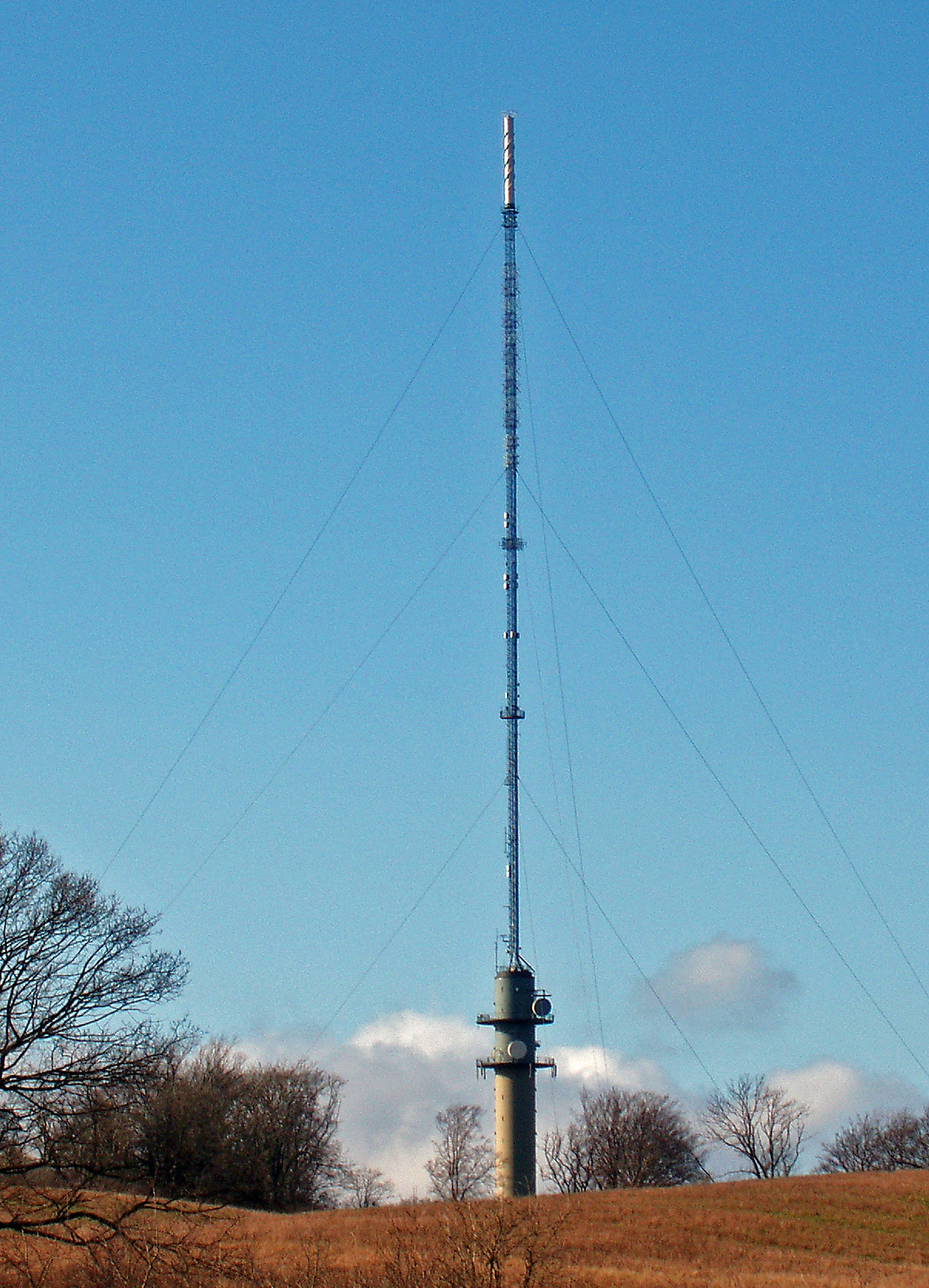
Structure Type; Antenna Height; Building Uses; Building Status	Tower, Guyed Mast; 325 m above the sea FM-transmission, directional radio Built & Active

Telecommunication Tower Aarhus (Danish Søsterhøj Antennen, Søsterhøj Senderen or simply Søsterhøj), is a radio and television transmission tower in Aarhus, Denmark. It is the main transmission antenna in all of Aarhus. The tower is situated on the top of the hill of Søsterhøj (112 metres above sea level) in the neighbourhood of Skåde, in the district of Højbjerg.

The construction of Telecommunication Tower Aarhus began in 1956, and it was finished later that same year. The tower and mast reach 216 m tall, with the tower itself at 65 metres.

Telecommunication Tower Aarhus has been noted worldwide for its relatively unusual use of concrete as a construction material for the tower supporting the long wired mast.

== See also ==
- List of tallest structures in Denmark
