= Giber Å =

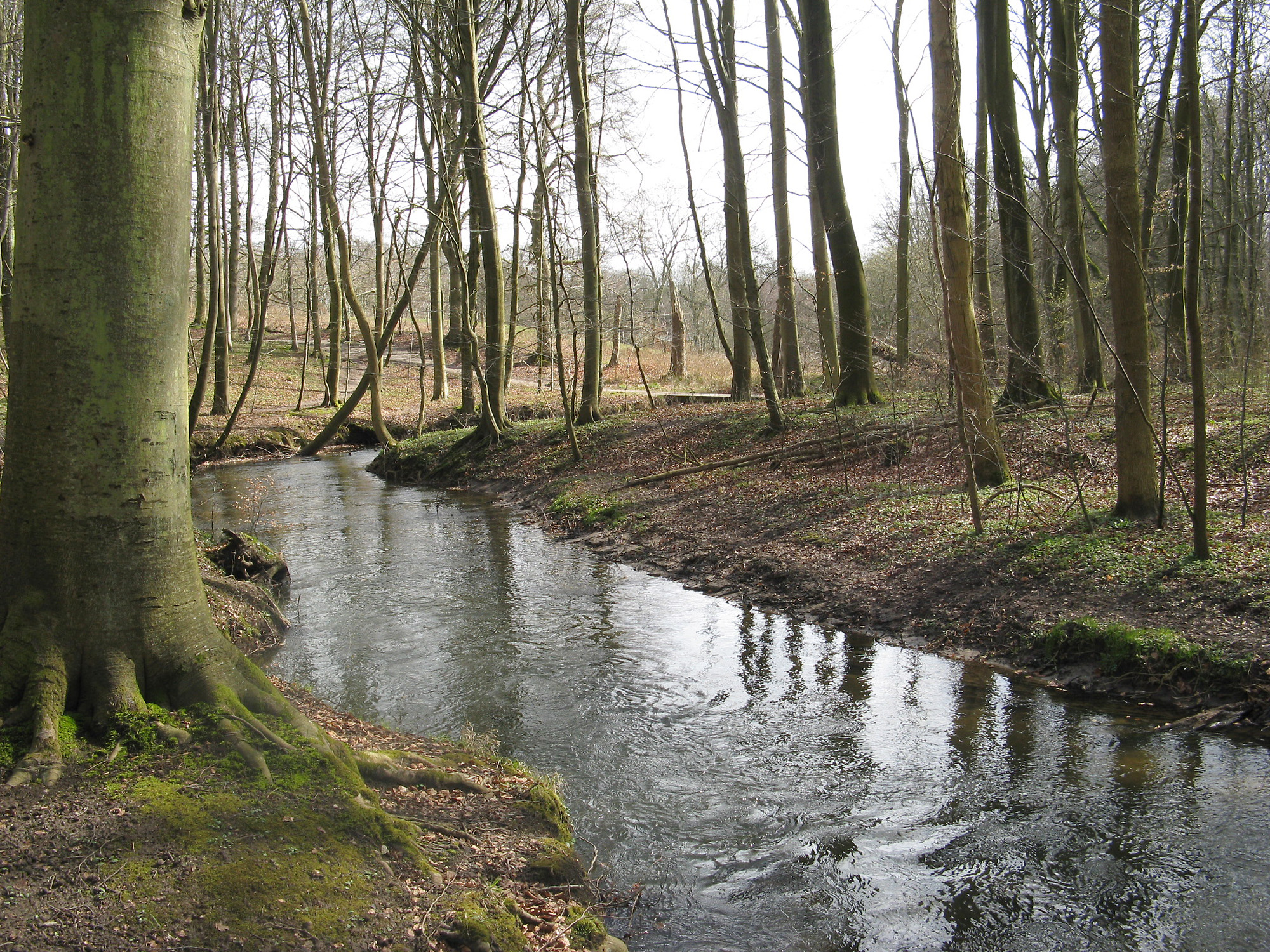
- Giber Å in Moesgård Forest

Location
- Country: Denmark

Physical characteristics
- Source
  - location: Aarhus Municipality
- Mouth
  - location: Moesgård Beach
  - coordinates: 56°05′07″N 10°14′56″E
- Length: 12 km.

Giber Å is a 12 kilometres (7.5 mi) long stream in Aarhus Municipality.

Giber Å and surroundings is a protected Natura 2000 site. The protection is mainly located in the Marselisborg Forests approximately 4 miles south of the city of Aarhus.

== Course ==
Giber Å springs from the bog of Testrup Mose, south of the suburb Tranbjerg, and runs through the town of Mårslet, past Vilhelmsborg Manor, before winding through Vilhelmsborg Forest and Moesgård Forest, to finally empty in Aarhus Bay by Moesgård Beach. The smaller streams of Ballebæk, Morsebæk, Hovedgrøften and Kapelbæk merges with Giber Å along its way, and the stream is also fed by the water treatment plants of the area. Since medieval times, Giber Å has marked the border between Beder and Mårslet Parishes, and today the stream outlines the northern border of the local municipal administrative area "Beder-Malling-Ajstrup".

Giber Å is unregulated, although it has through time been used by water treatment plants at Vilhelmsborg, Fulden Mill and Moesgård Forest Mill. North of the mouth of the stream is a flat valley which stretches to the stone dykes at Moesgård Forest. The area is open and managed as a recreational area with scattered trees and solitary conifers (Juniperus communis).

== Ecology ==
In 2004, Moesgård Beach, by the outlet of Giber Å, was one of 18 Danish beaches hit by a bathing moratorium due to high levels of E. coli bacteria, stemming from the municipal water treatment plants that use the stream as a recipient. Regardless, sea trout travel through Giber Å and can be found in the streams that feed it. Trout has been found as far upstream as Hovedgrøften and Kapelbæk, a stream originating in Hørret Forest. Aarhus Municipality works with locals to establish fish ladders to improve conditions for fish in the stream. The white-throated dipper winters in Denmark and can be found at Giber Å and associated streams. Giber Å has periodically had a very low water level due to redirected water for agriculture and household use. The former Århus County decided the stream could be supplemented with water from a rain water basin in Tranbjerg and if necessary groundwater.

== Gallery ==
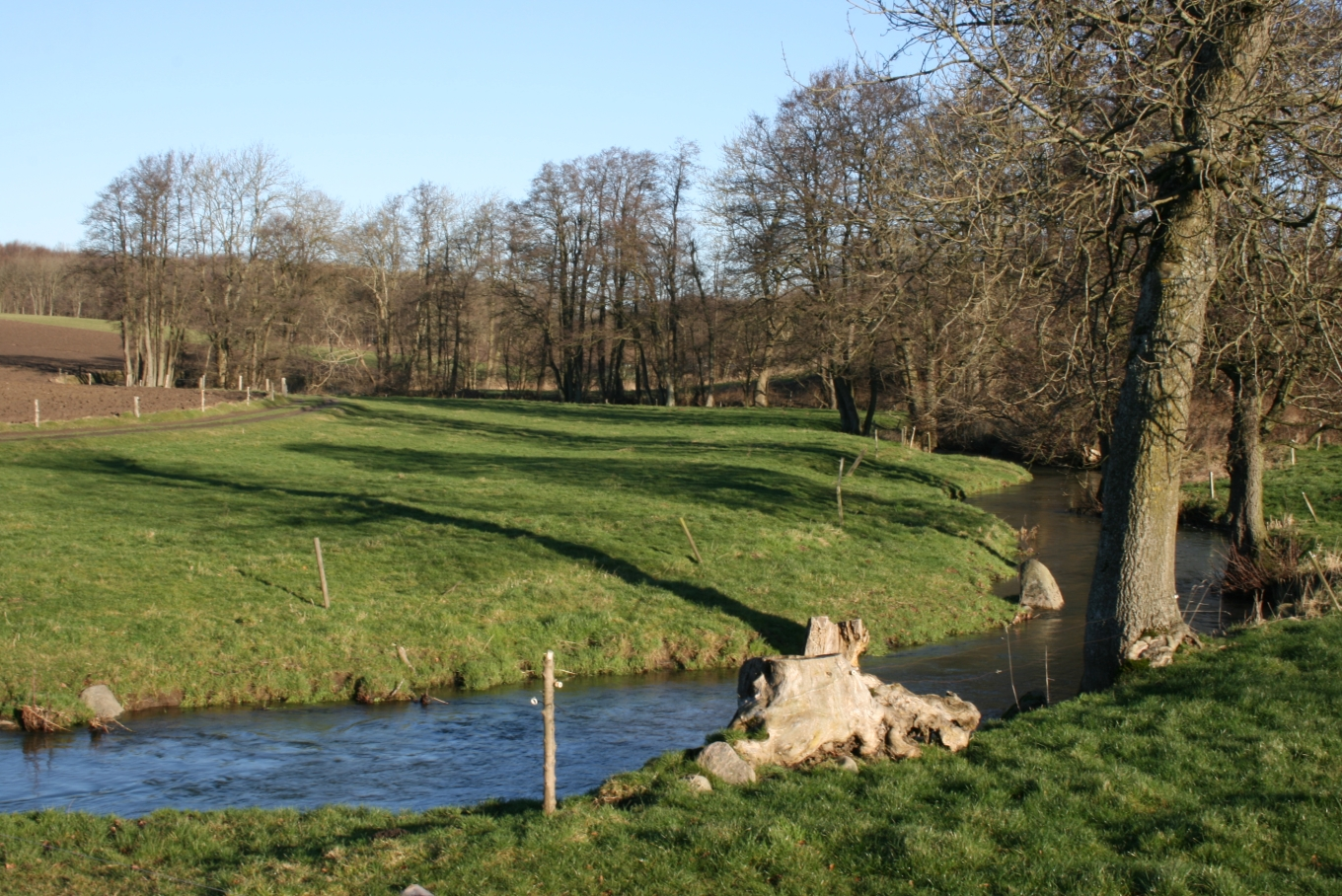
At Vilhelmsborg

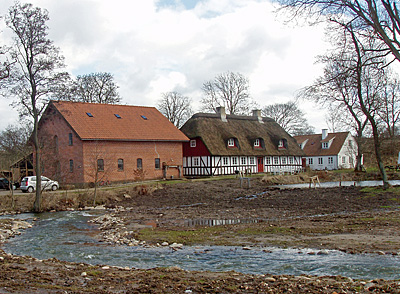
Fulden Mill

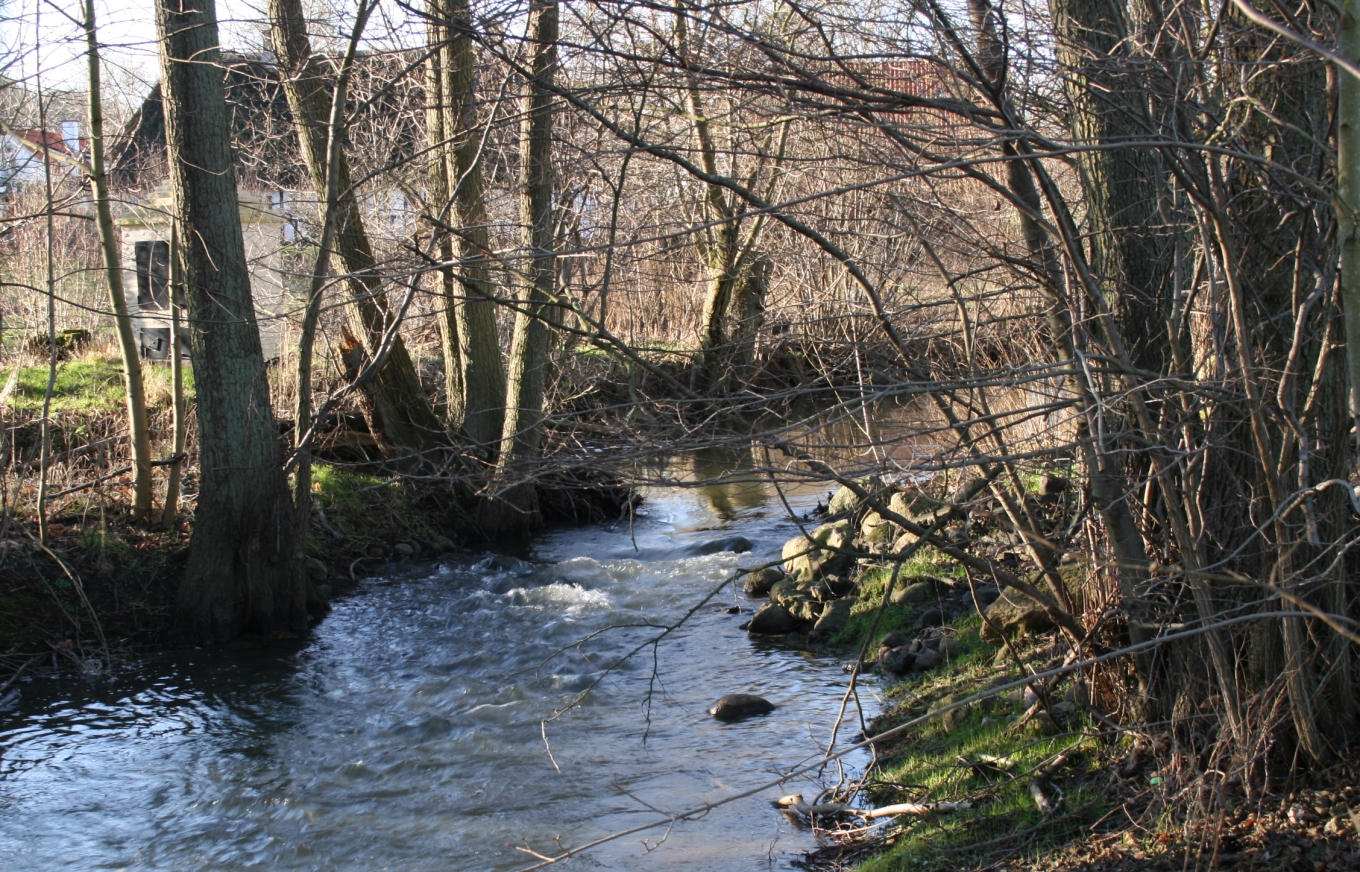
Entering Moesgård Forest

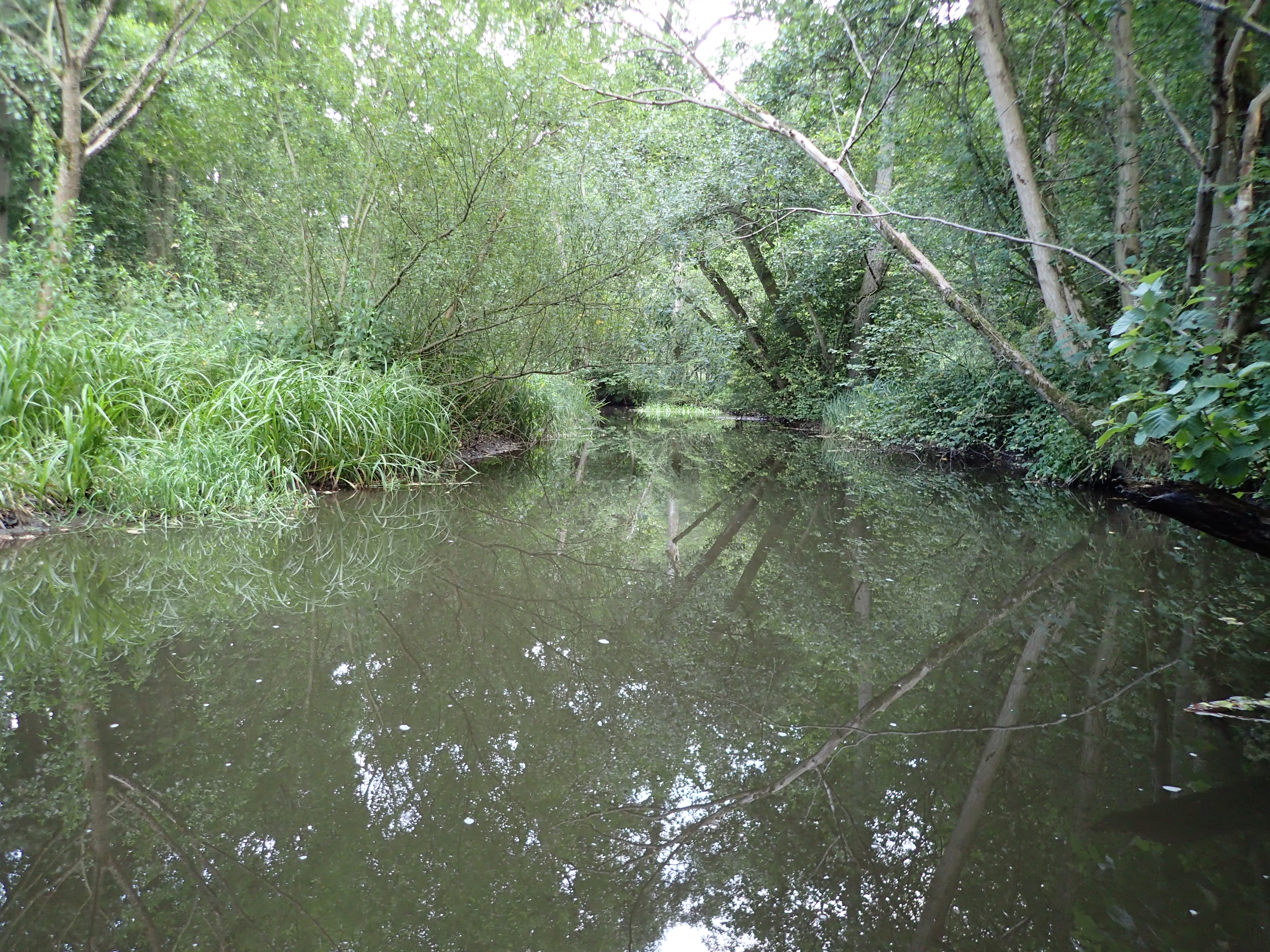
In Moesgård Forest

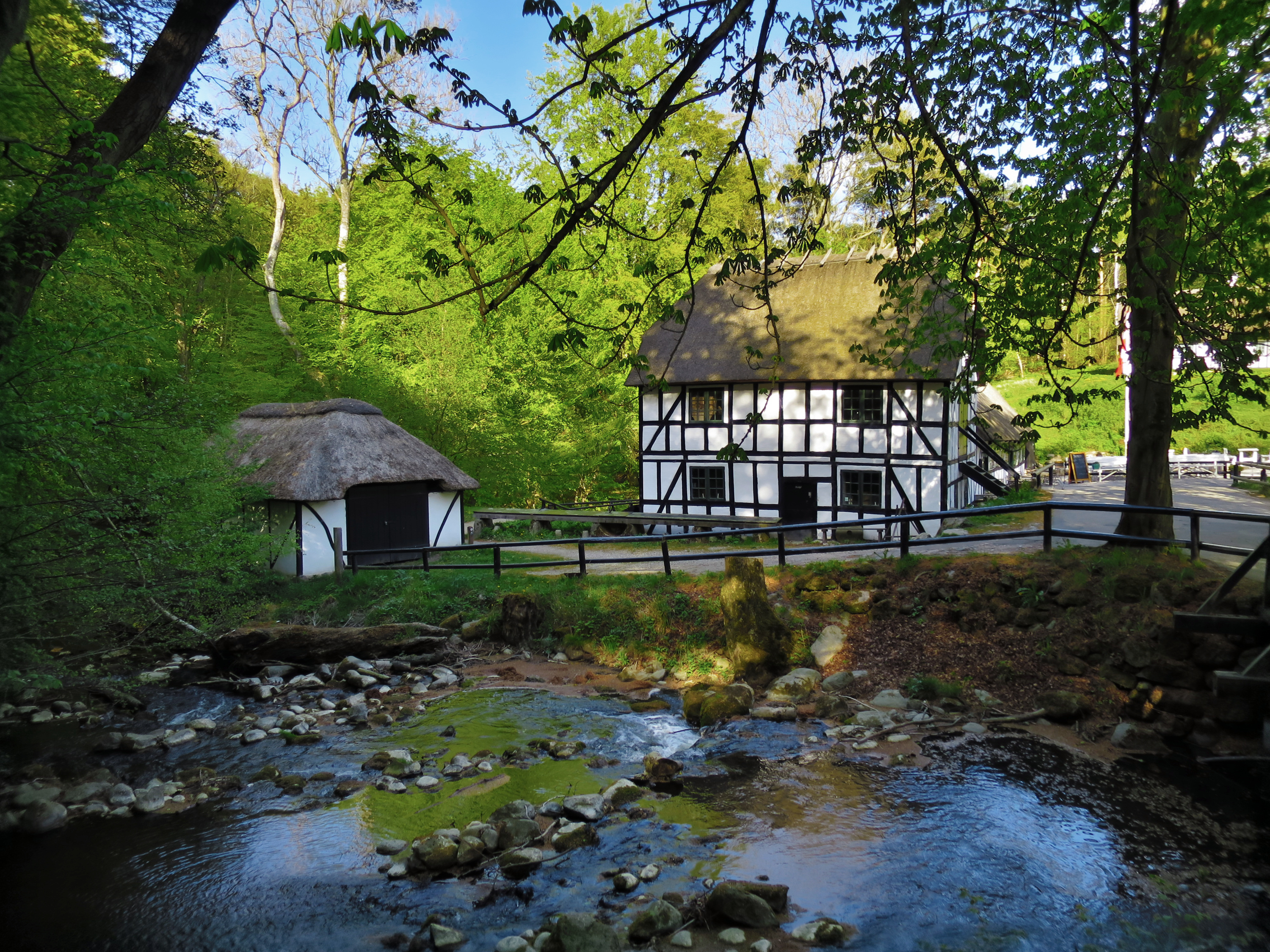
At Skovmøllen water mill in Moesgård Forest

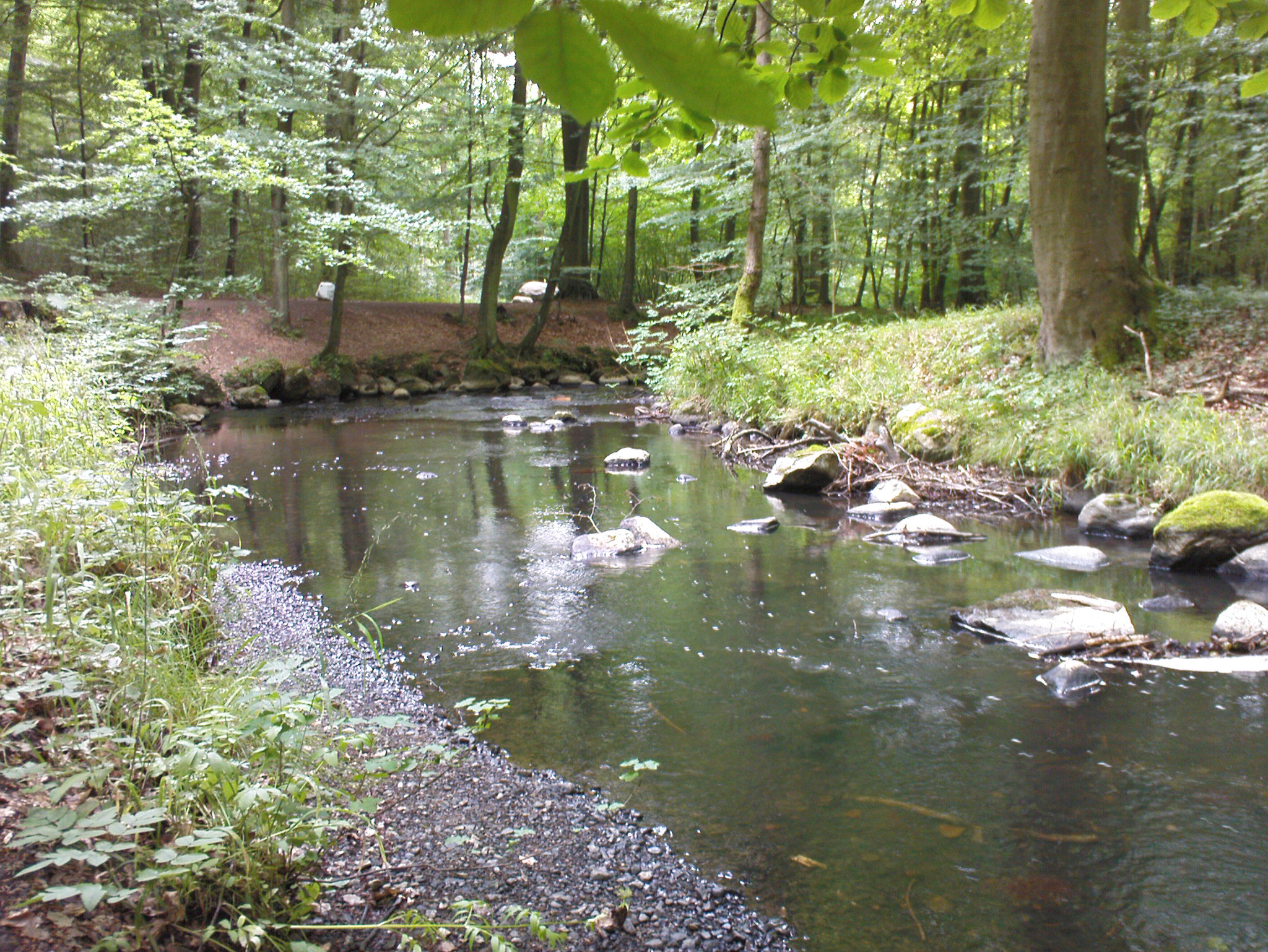
In Moesgård Forest

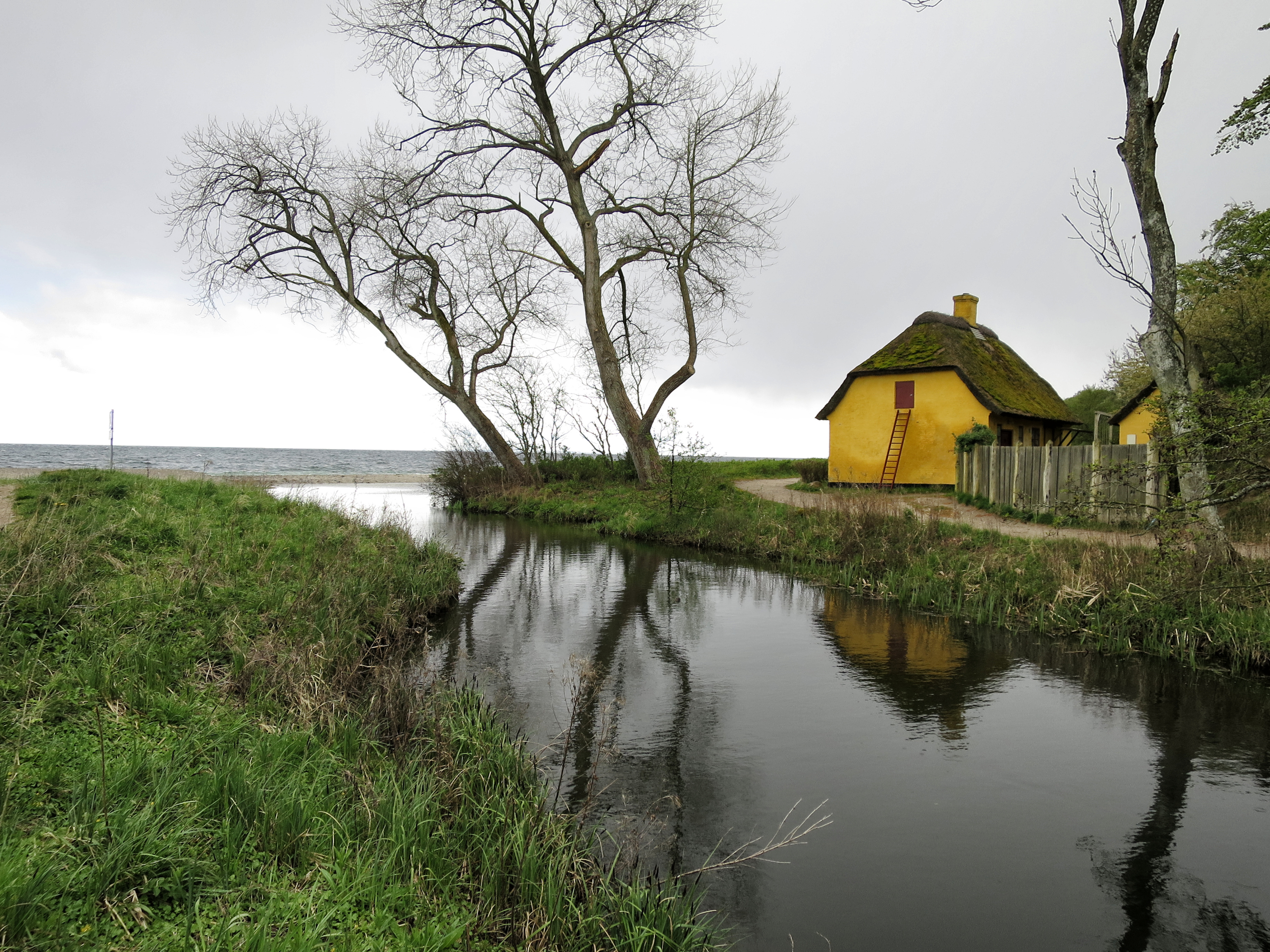
River mouth

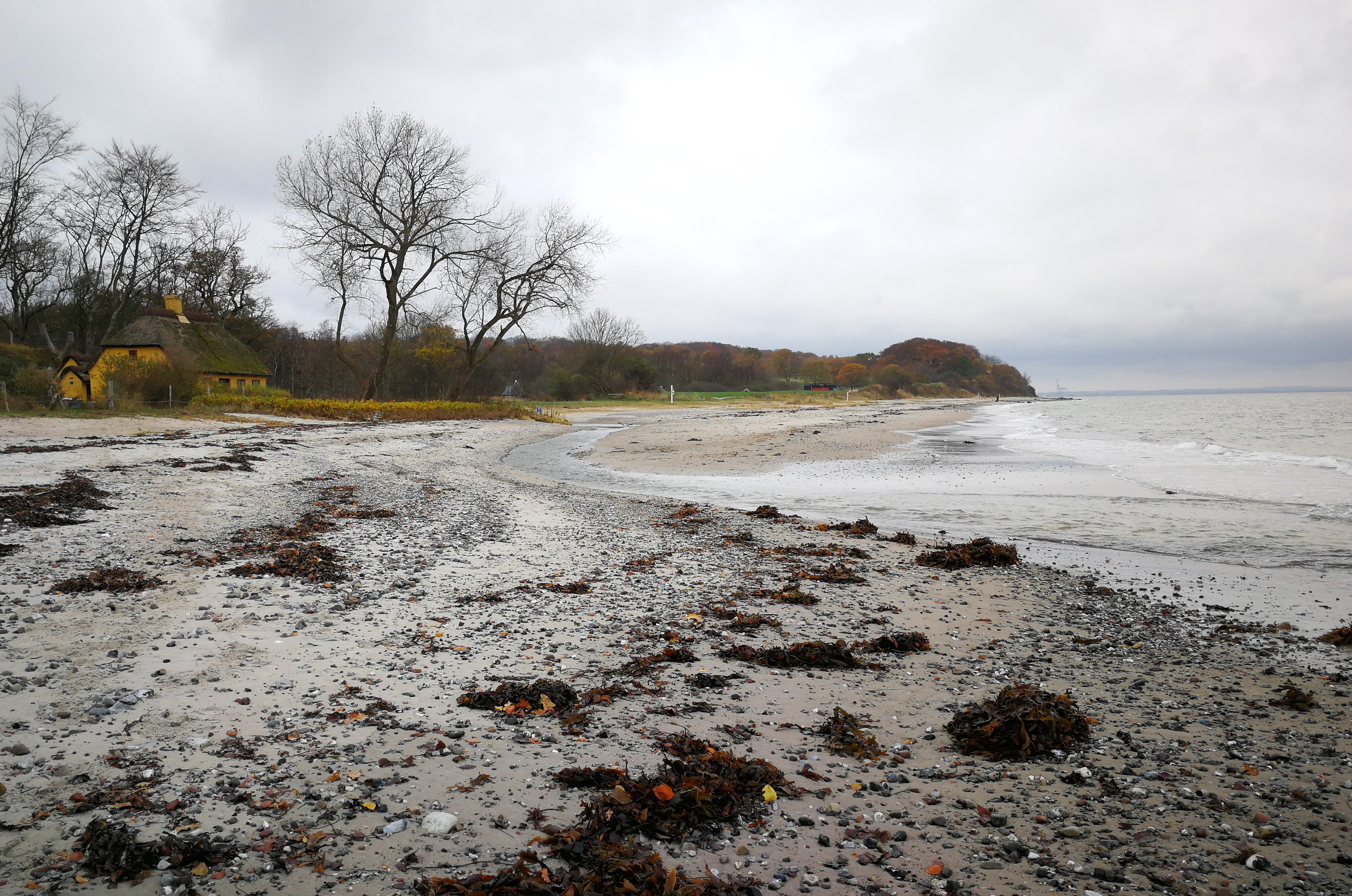
At Moesgård Beach

In art

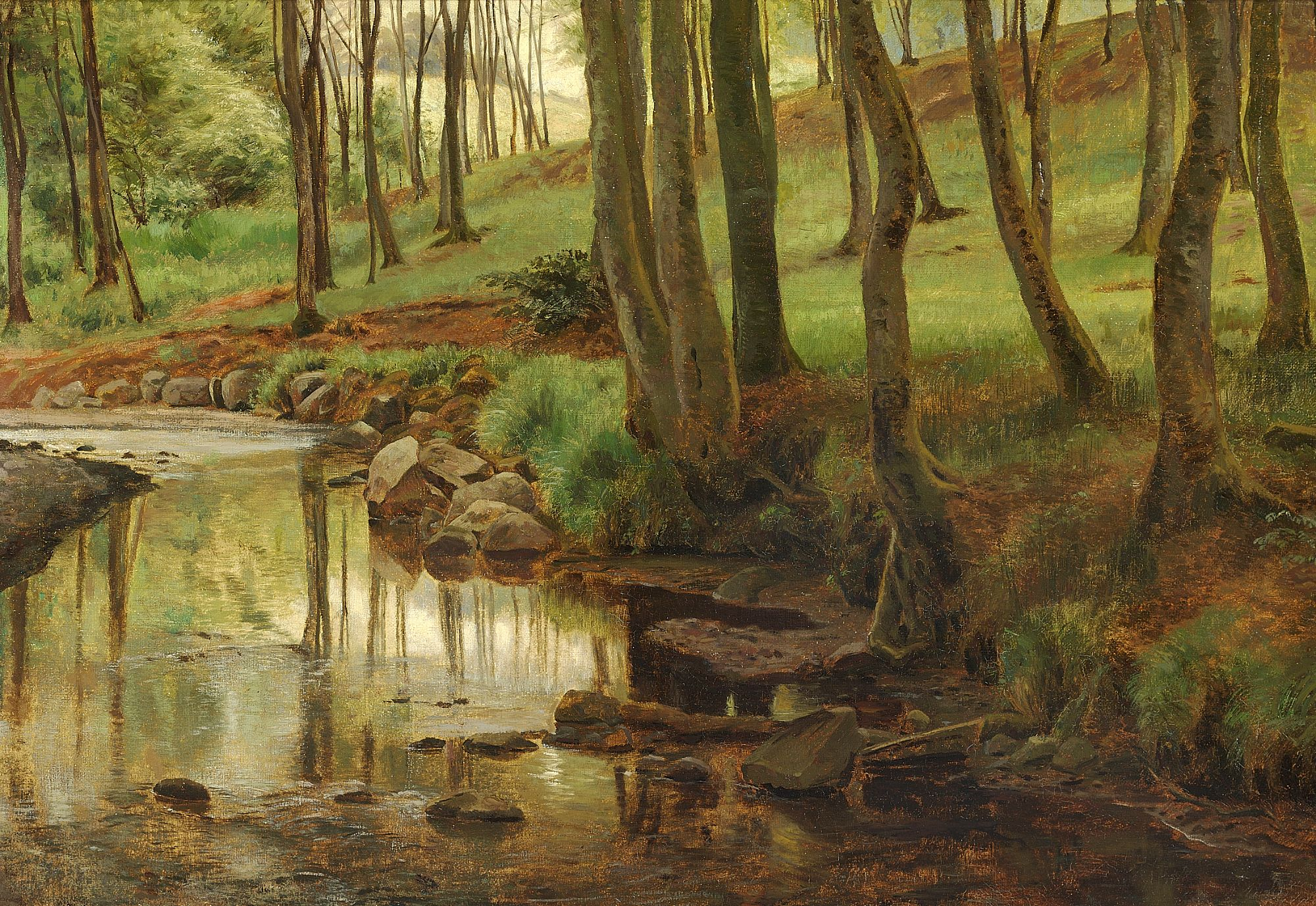
"Aaløb i Moesgaard Skov" by Janus la Cour (1885).

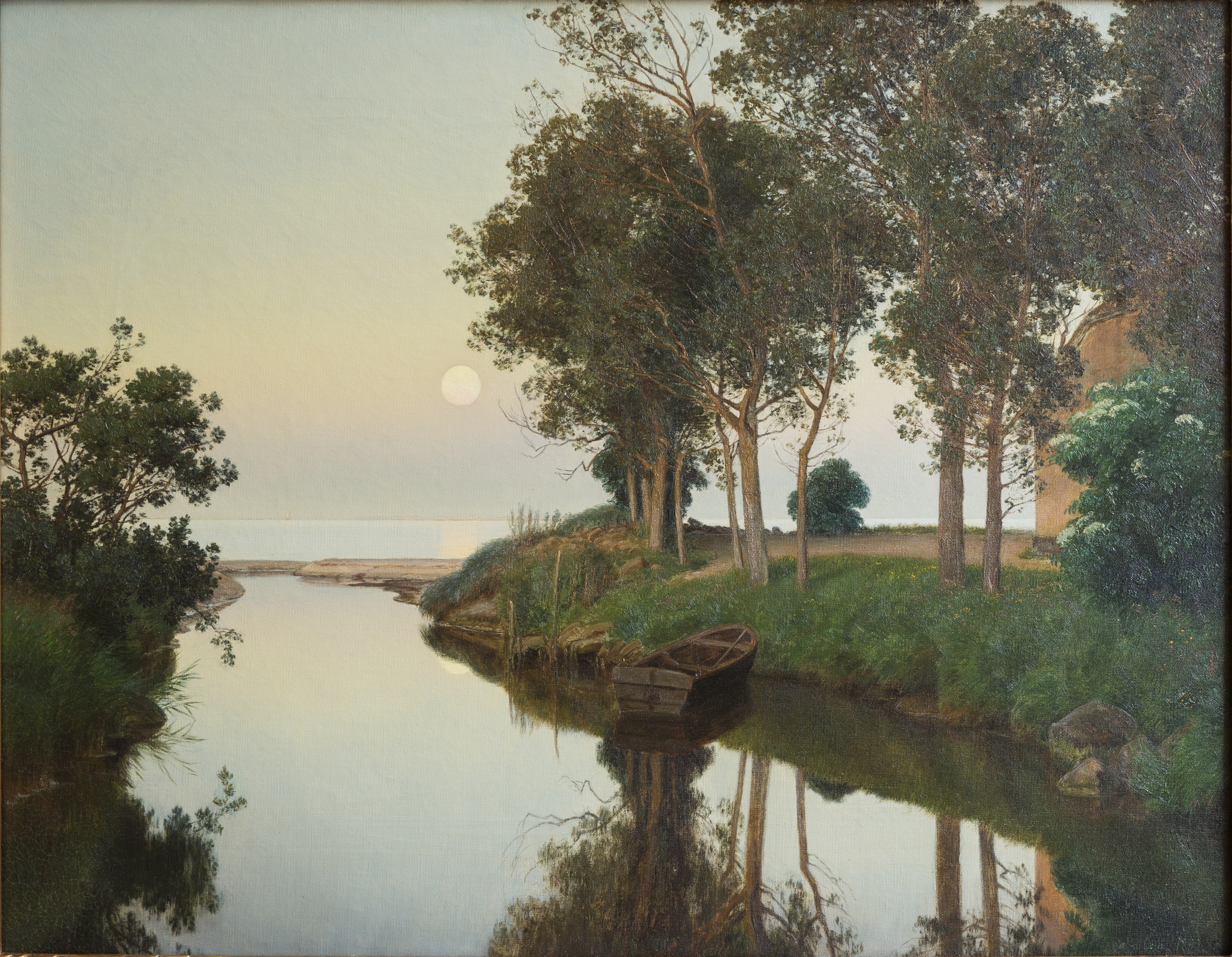
"Stille sommeraften ved åens udløb i havet" by Janus la Cour (1892).
