= Moesgård Forest Mill =

Watermill in Aarhus, Denmark

Coordinates: 56.0844°N 10.2351°E

- Moesgård Skovmølle
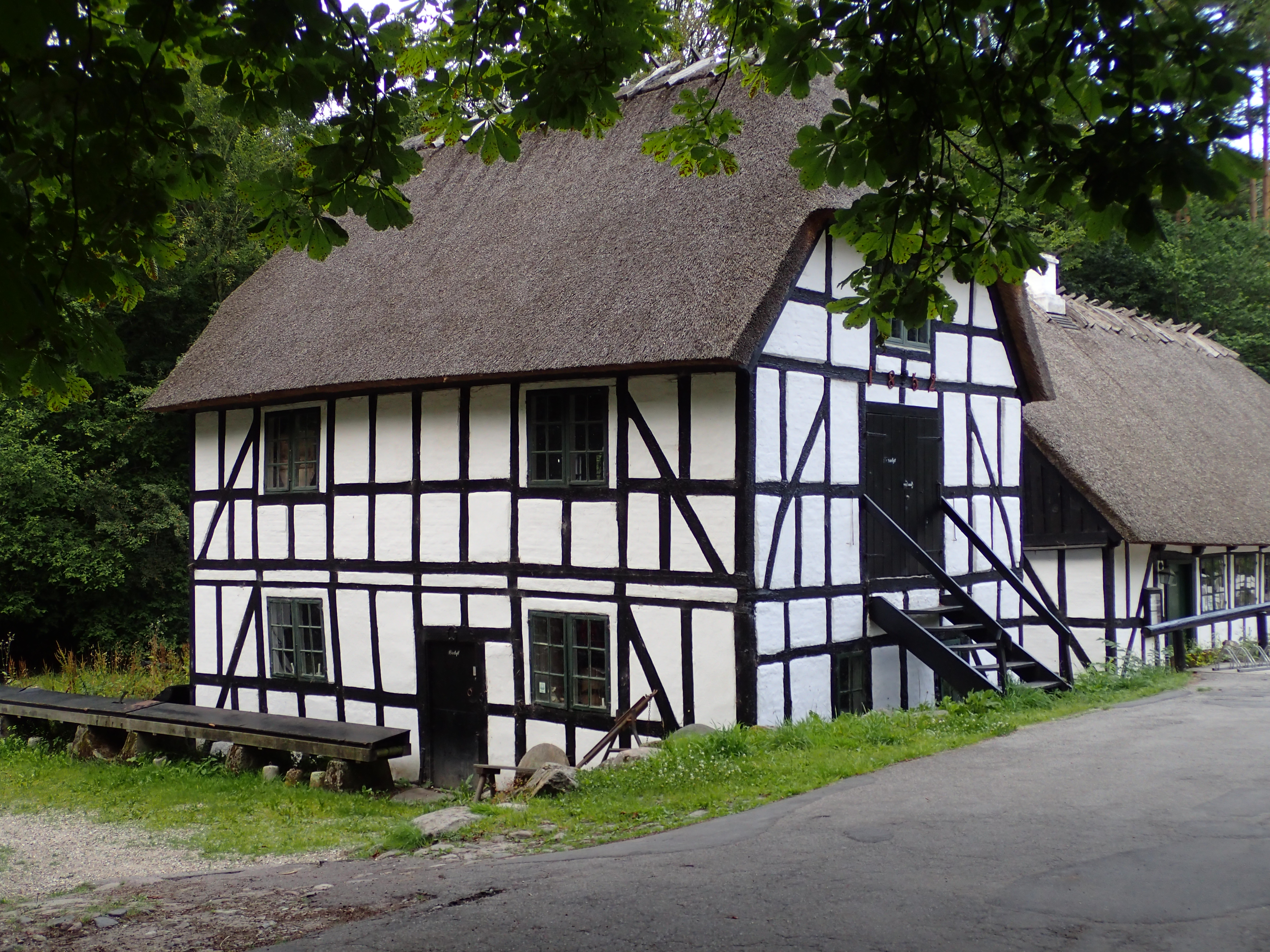
- The milling house. There are several other buildings attached.
- Interactive map of the Moesgård Forest Mill area

General information
- Architectural style: Half-timbered
- Location: Aarhus, Denmark
- Completed: 1785

Technical details
- Floor count: 2

Moesgård Forest Mill (Danish: Moesgård Skovmølle or just Danish: Skovmøllen) is a mill and a listed building in Aarhus, Denmark. The mill was built in 1785 and was listed on the Danish registry of protected buildings and places by the Danish Heritage Agency on 13 April 1984. The mill is situated in the Marselisborg Forests just south of the suburb Skåde and Moesgård Museum, some 6 km. south of Aarhus city center.

== History ==
The mill is mentioned for the first time in 1570. It is situated in the forests south of Aarhus along the Giber Å stream which has, in spite of its short length of 12 km., serviced three mills; Rokballe, Fulden, and Moesgård mills. Today only Moesgård Forest Mill survives as a functional mill. For most of its time, the millers on the property were copyholders under Moesgård Manor. The mill had lands attached making it possible to run a small farm along with the mill.

The last copyholder on the mill was Frederik Jensen who received royal permission to establish a grain thresher. However, the mill was profitable and Thorkild Christian Dahl of Moesgård wished to run the mill directly under his estate. Frederik Jensen was eventually driven off the land and the mill was henceforth managed directly under Moesgård. The mill was renovated in 1852 and the main building made one floor higher. The last miller was Søren Petersen in 1883–1922. His son-in-law inherited the mill and turned it into a sawmill.

In the late 1800s, the mill became a popular destination for Aarhusians on day trips which it remains to this day. The ground floor of the main building is today a restaurant. The mill was restored in 1991 and is today operated by Moesgård Museum as a museum.

== Architecture ==
The mill appears as it did after the last major changes in 1852. The mill itself is from 1785 although the first floor was added in 1852. The farmhouse was built in 1824. The mill is built on a base of boulders with half-timbered walls and gables. The roof is thatched with straw and the milling equipment is in almost original condition.
