= Risskov Skole =

School in Risskov, Denmark

Coordinates: 56.1929°N 10.2291°E

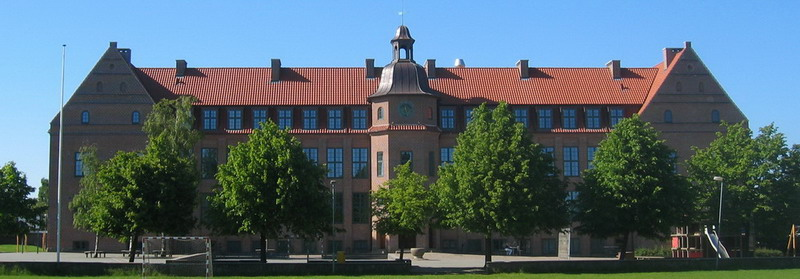
Risskov Skole

Risskov Skole is a school in Risskov in the north of Aarhus, Denmark.

In the early 1900s, Vejlby, Stationsbyen (now called Stationsgade) and Vejlby Krat expanded. Therefore, a decision was made to build a new school on the field between the towns. The school was designed by M. B. Fritz and the inauguration took place on 8 April 1927. After the Second World War the whole area became established and the school grew and, at one point, had over 1,200 students.

Risskov School has been renovated many times over the years, the latest in 2005. Today the school has around 800 students.
