= VUC Aarhus =

Secondary school in Aarhus, Denmark

Coordinates: 56.105858°N 10.114617°E

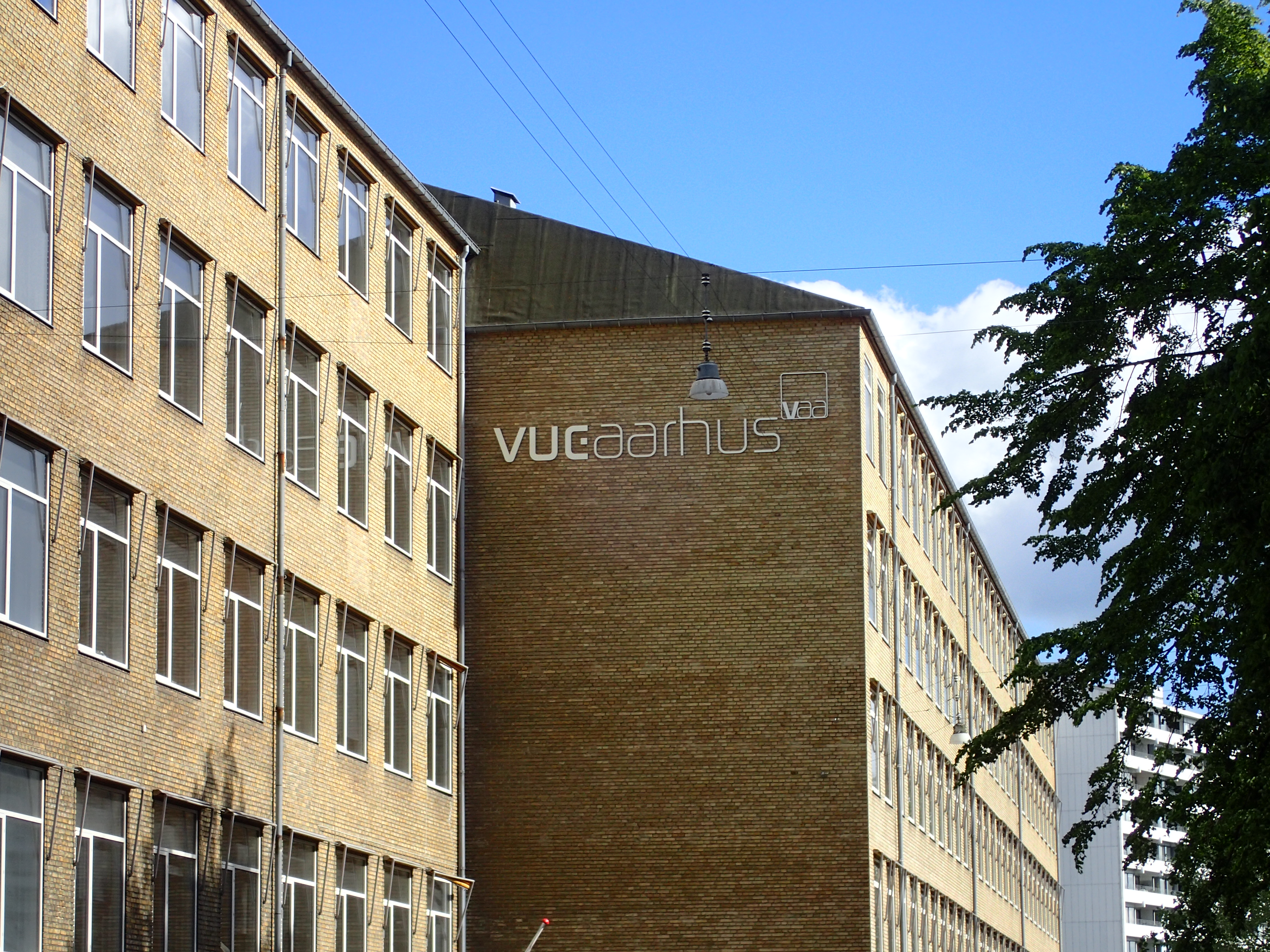
- VUC Aarhus
- Type: Secondary education
- Rector: Erik Ernø-Kjølhede (2015)
- Administrative staff: 330
- Students: 2000 full time 6000 part-time(2015)
- Location: Aarhus, Denmark
- Website: http://www.vucaarhus.dk/

VUC Aarhus (short for Voksen Uddannelses Center Aarhus) is a school of secondary education in Aarhus, Denmark. The school offers the 2 year Higher Preparatory Examination (HF) programme and supplementary courses (GSK) to the Matriculation examination (STX) within a range of disciplines. The school has since 2007 been an independent self-owning educational institution under the supervision of the state, managed by a board in conjunction with a principal who manages the day-to-day operations.

== Programmes ==
VUC Aarhus offers 5 main educational programmes each divided into elective courses based on the wishes of the individual student. The Almen Voksenddannelse (AVU) programme is meant for adults seeking to pass the primary school exams. The Higher Preparatory Examination (HF) programme is a lighter 2-year version of the traditional Matriculation examination (STX). The Gymnasial Supplering (GS) programme are individual courses designed to supplement either the STX or the HF programmes in cases where specific classes are necessary or desired. The Ordblindeundervisning (OBU) programme is designed for dyslexic students and the Forberedende Voksenuddannelse (FVU) is a preparatory course for adults seeking supplementary qualifying training either part-time or full-time.

Along with Viby Gymnasium, VUC Aarhus is offering Chinese as the only secondary educational institutions in Aarhus. In Denmark, Chinese is currently taught at a total of 29 secondary educational institutions altogether.
