= Moesgård Beach =

Beach in Aarhus, Denmark

- Beach
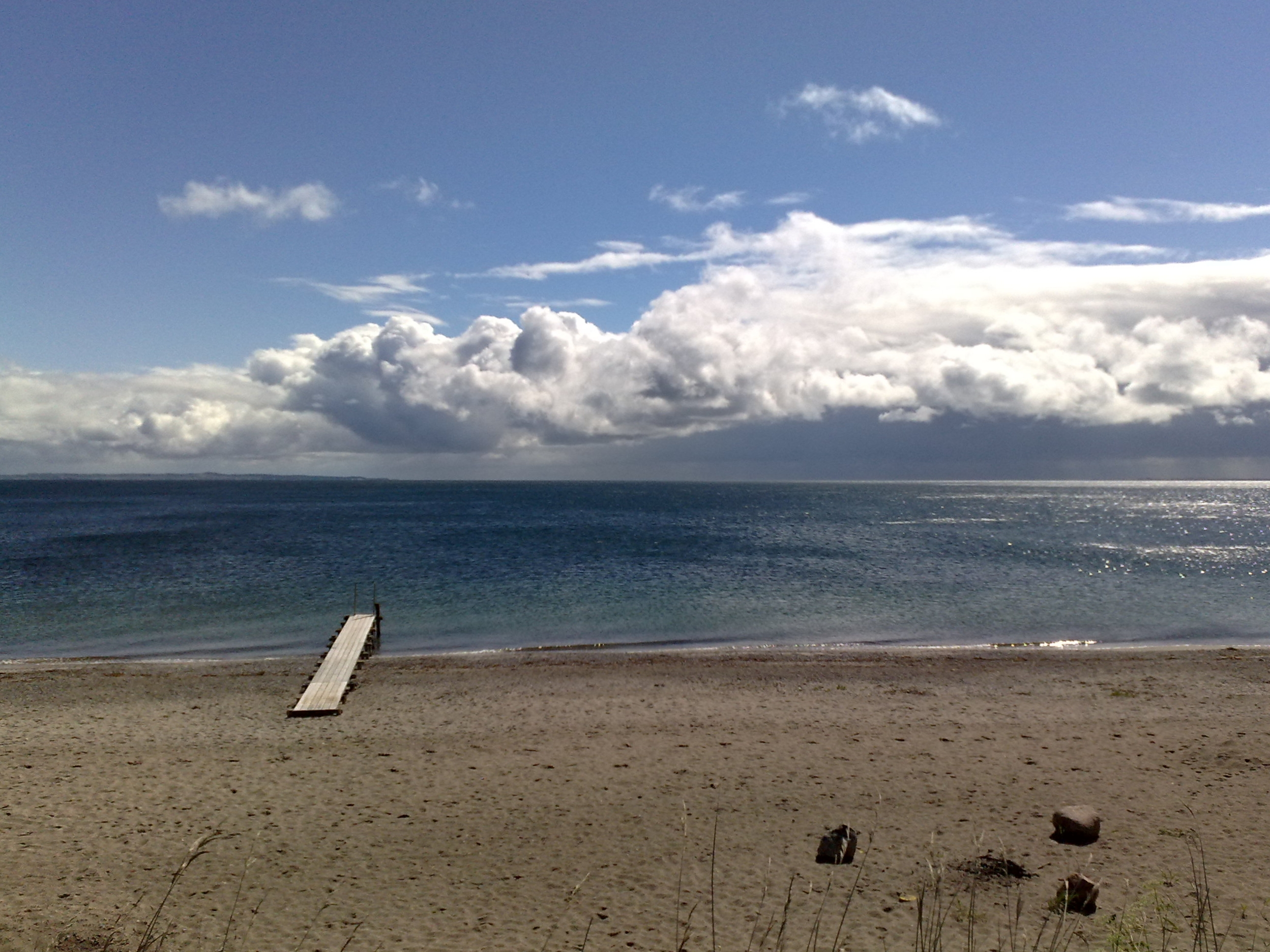
- Moesgård Beach
- Interactive map of Moesgård Beach
- Coordinates: 56.088°N 10.248°E
- Location: Marselisborg Forests, Aarhus, Denmark

Dimensions
  - Length: 1000 meters
- Access: Ørneredevej, Buses 17, 123

Moesgård Beach is a public Blue Flag beach in Aarhus Municipality in Denmark. The beach is located in the southern outskirts of Aarhus in the Marselisborg Forests on the Bay of Aarhus in the suburb of Højbjerg. Helgenæs lies across the bay to the east, a bit inland to the west is the Marselisborg Deer Park and to the north is the Varna Palace. The beach area is some 1000 meters long and between 25 and 40 meters wide. It is a white sandy beach with occasional rows of boulders extending into the sea, for coastal erosion protection. Moesgård Beach is popular for sunbathing and swimming due to the shielding effects and scenic views of the nearby forests on the steep hillsides to the west. The beach has a single jetty extending some 20 meters into the sea, offering a platform to jump from or relax on. The Beach is open year-round for everyone at no charge.

Moesgård Beach has a life guard in the summer and there is a safety station with a lifesaver. It's situated in an area with heavy foot traffic, busy roads and Moesgård Museum and Moesgård Manor lies 1.5 kilometers to the west. Aarhus Municipality frequently tests the water for bacteria and algae and rates all beaches on a yearly basis. In 2014 and 2015 the beach has received the highest possible 3/3 rating. The water level drops off relatively rapidly and reaches a depth of 2 meters some 20 meters from the shore.

== Access ==
The beach lies at the end of Strandskovvej in the Marselisborg Forests which can be reached by Aarhus Sporveje buses. Bus no. 18 depart from the Aarhus Central Station and stops at Strandskovvej by Moesgård Beach. Danish National Cycle Route 5 runs along the coast of eastern Jutland from Odder Municipality to central Aarhus, passing through the Marselisborg Forests and by Moesgård Beach, before it continues north past Ballehage Beach to the north of Aarhus and Den Permanente, Bellevue Beach and Åkrogen. It's possible to walk the 7 km. to Moesgård Beach, along the coast from Indre by and Marselisborg Yacht Harbour lies 4 km. north of the beach, providing access by sea for smaller boats and ships that can dock on the beach.

== Gallery ==
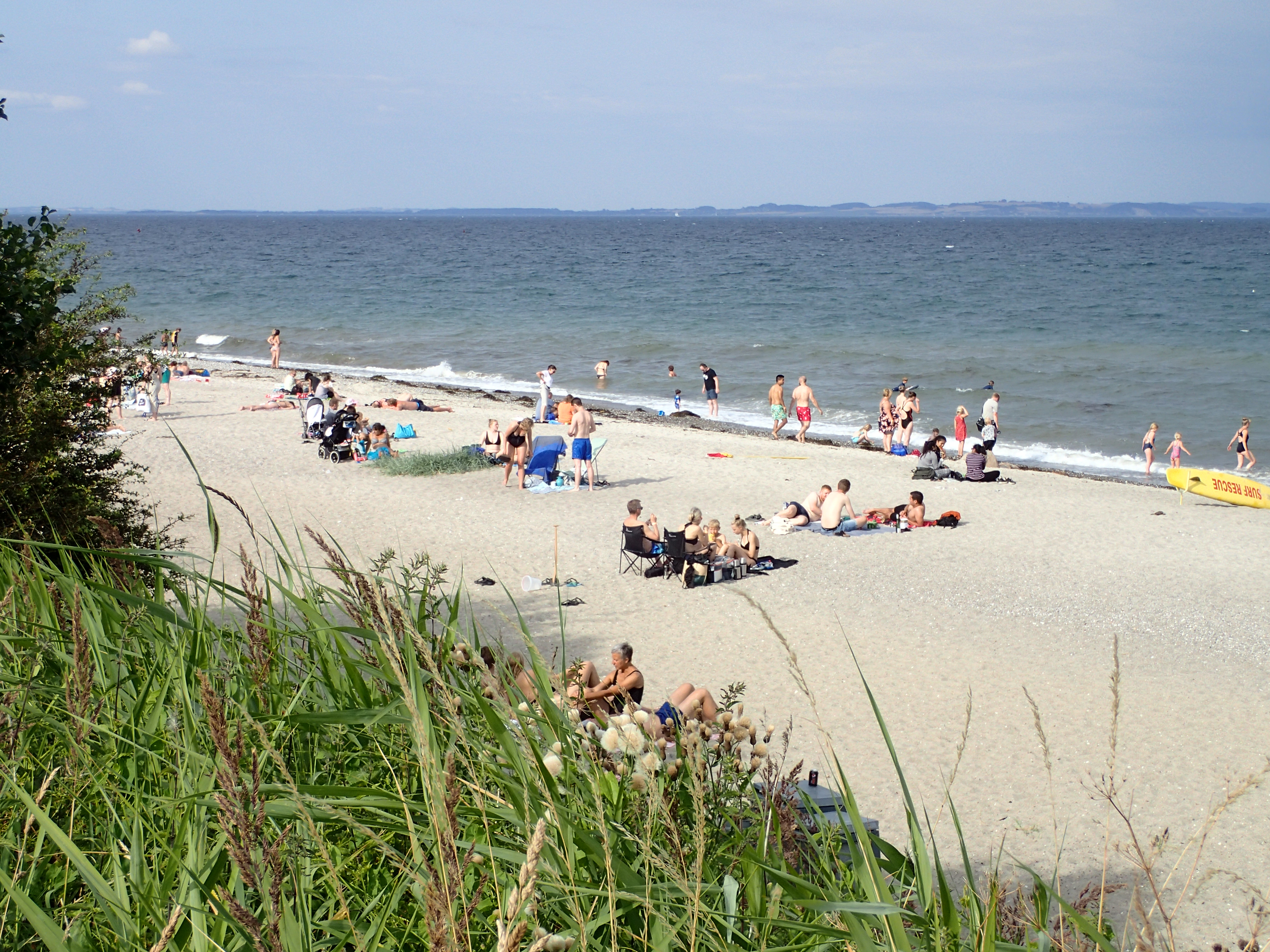
Summer

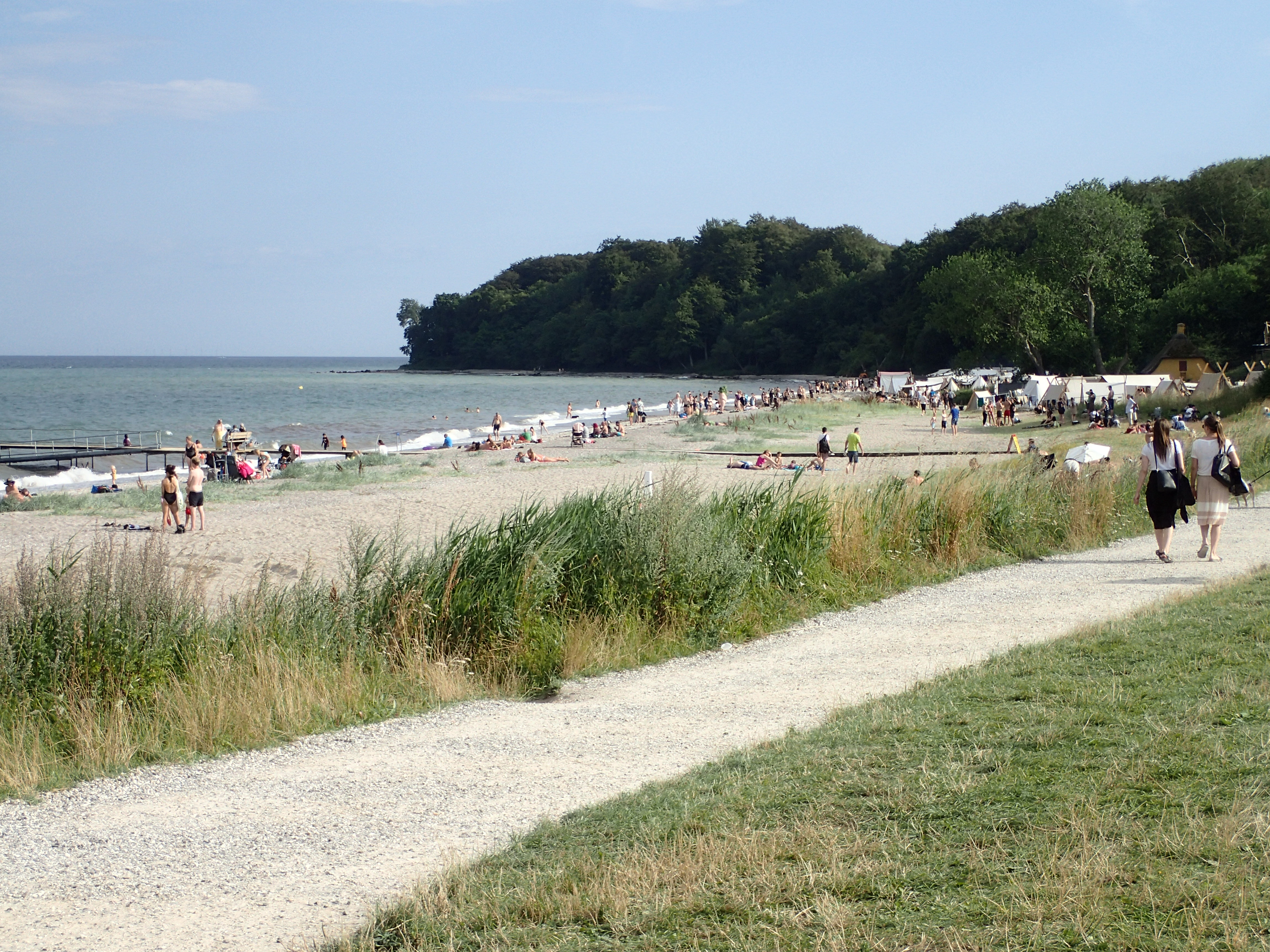
Summer, south section

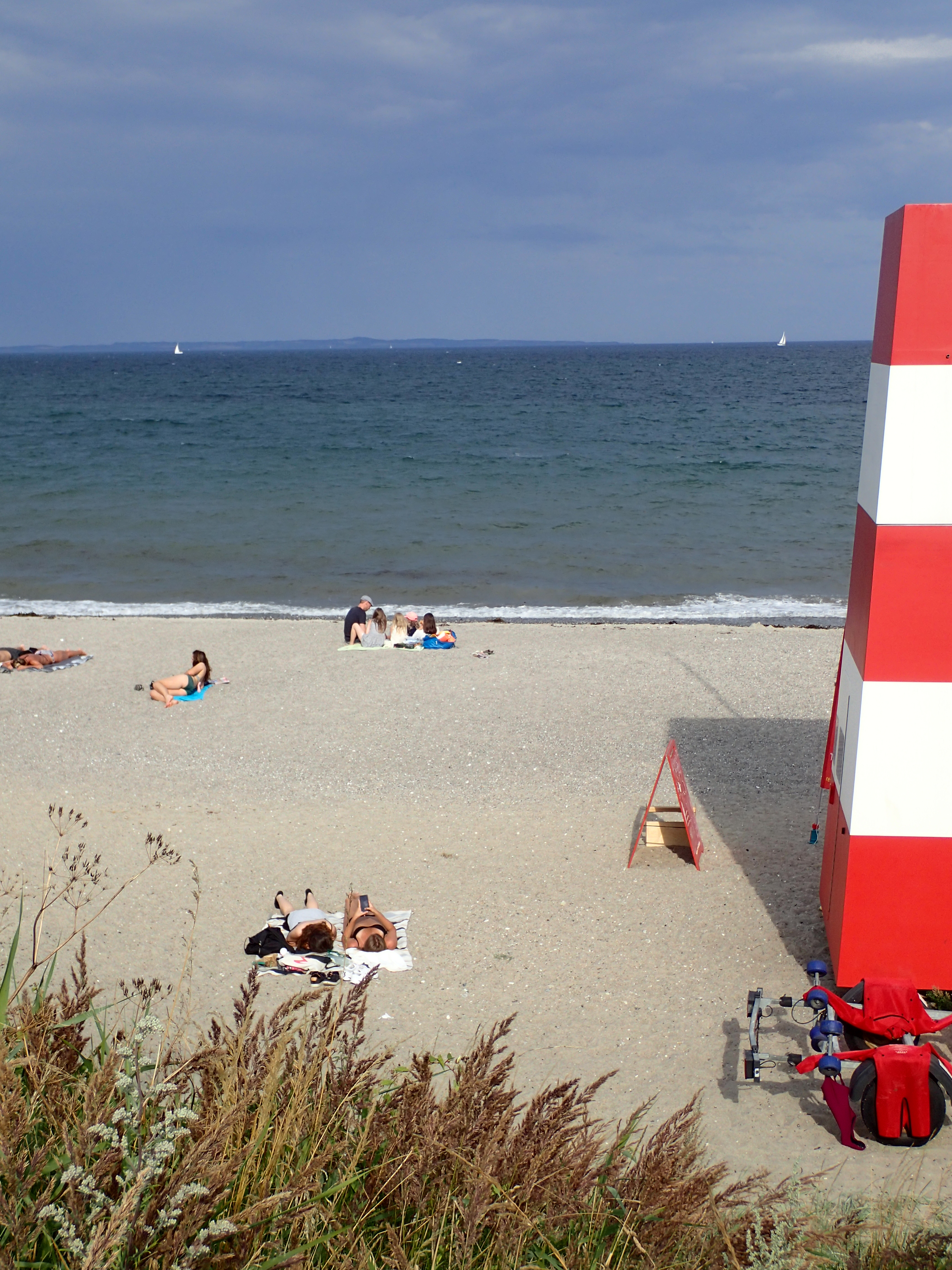
The beach is equipped with a life-guard tower

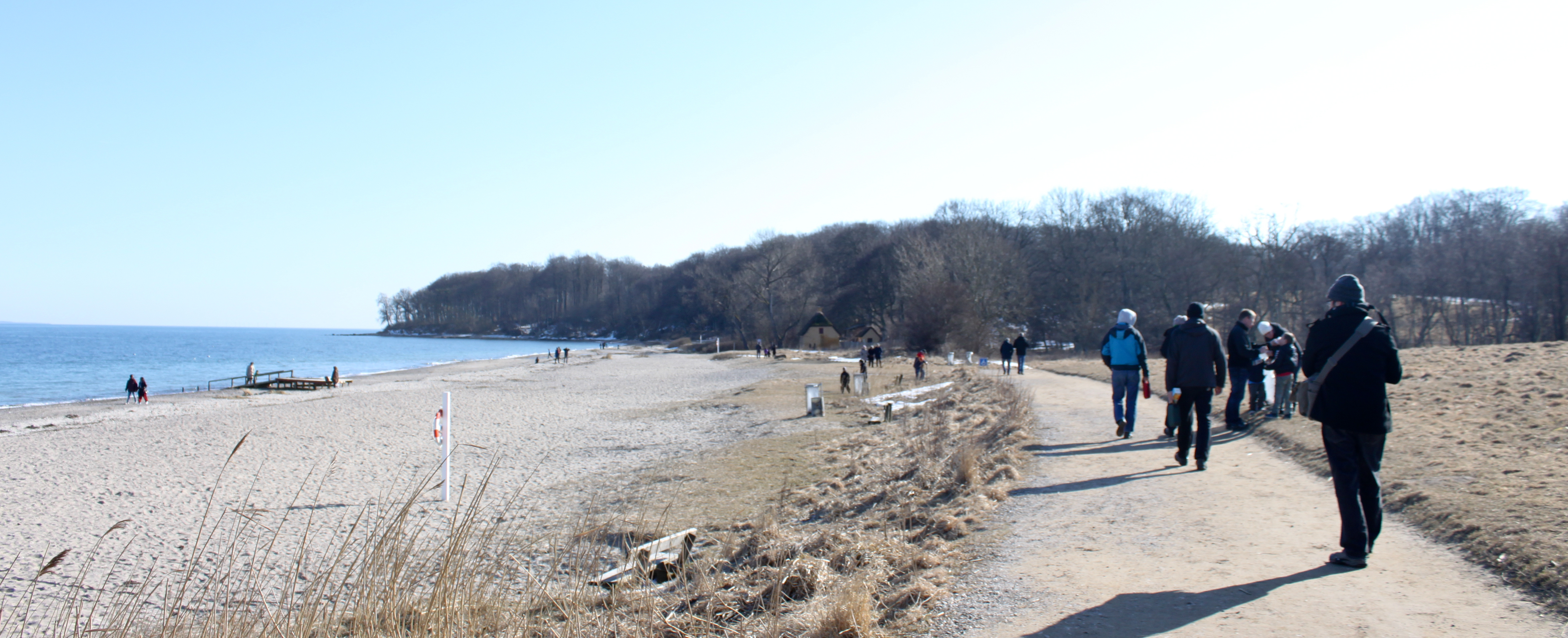
South section

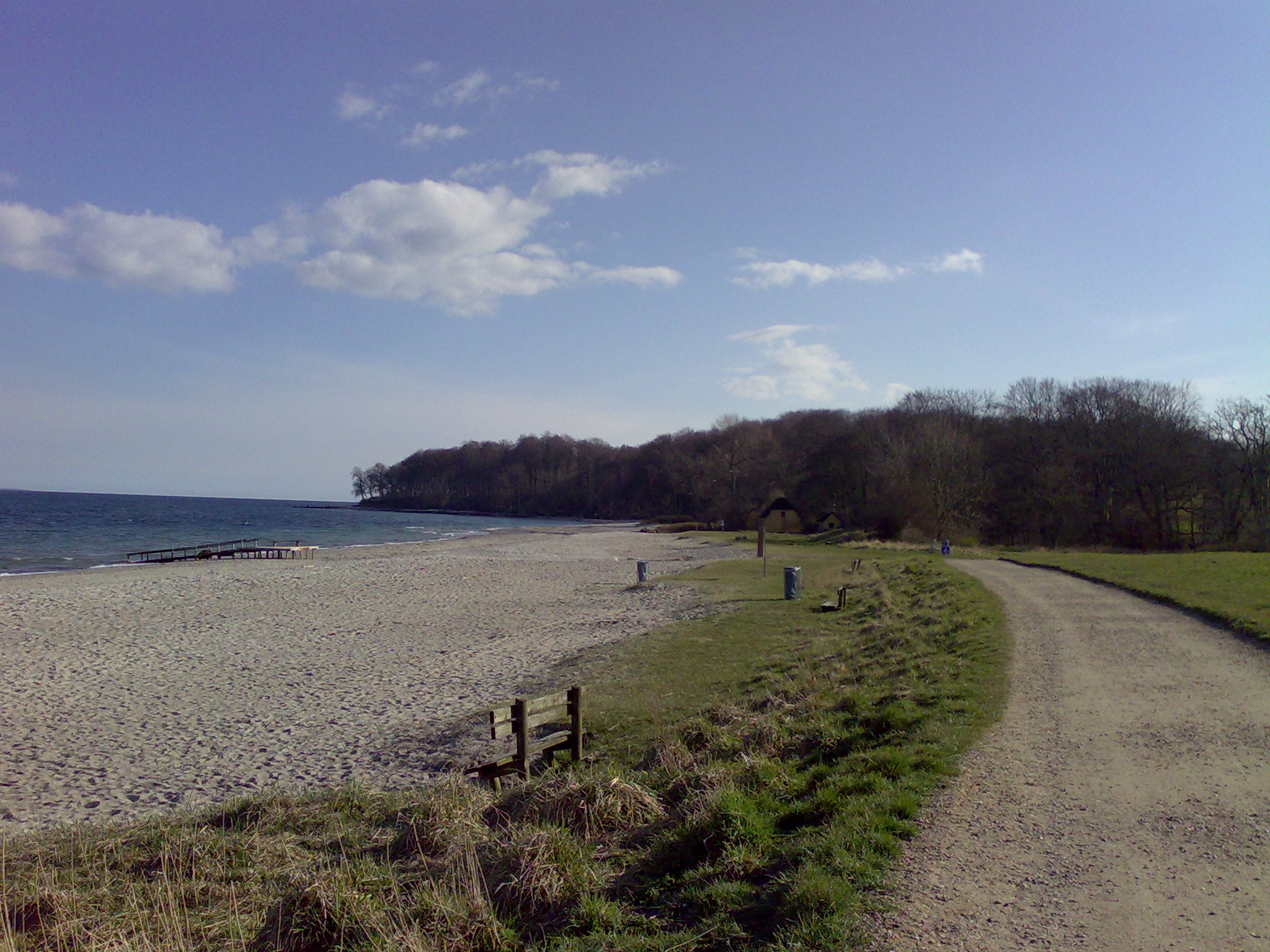

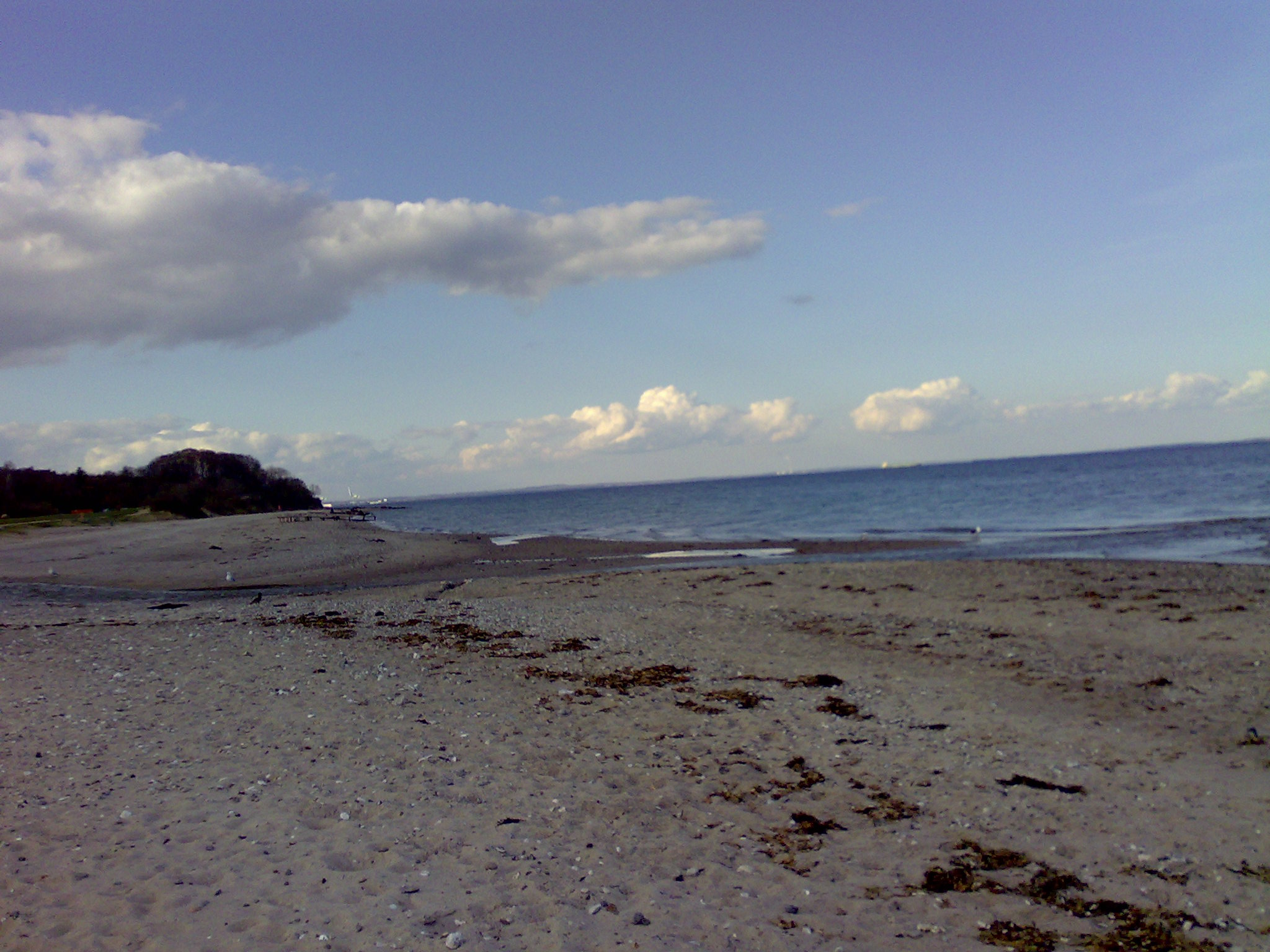

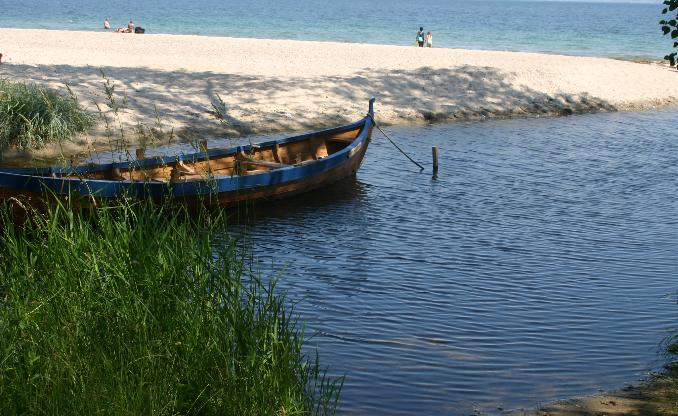
Giber Å outlet

Coastal area in art

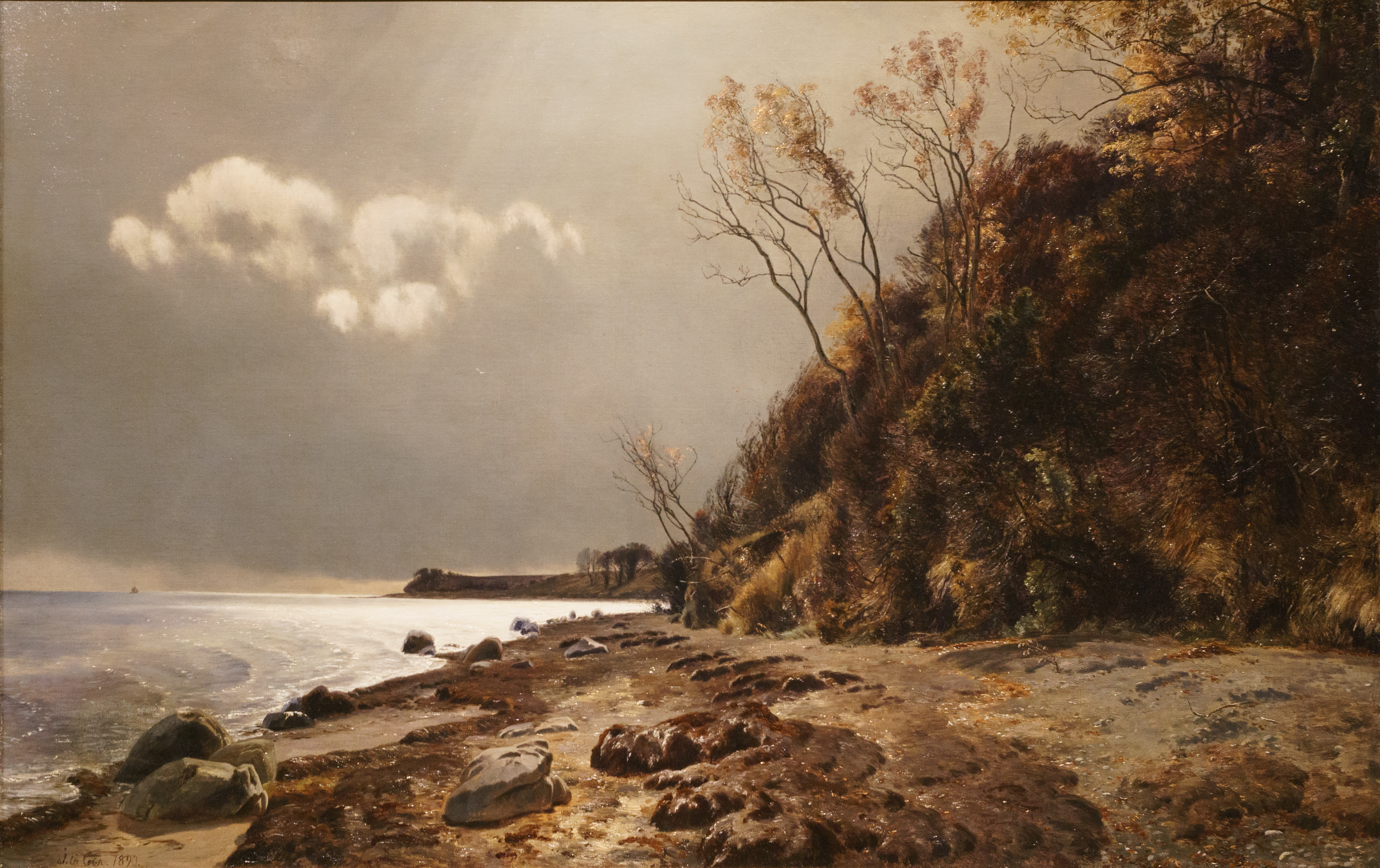
"Moesgård Strand" (1890) by Janus la Cour

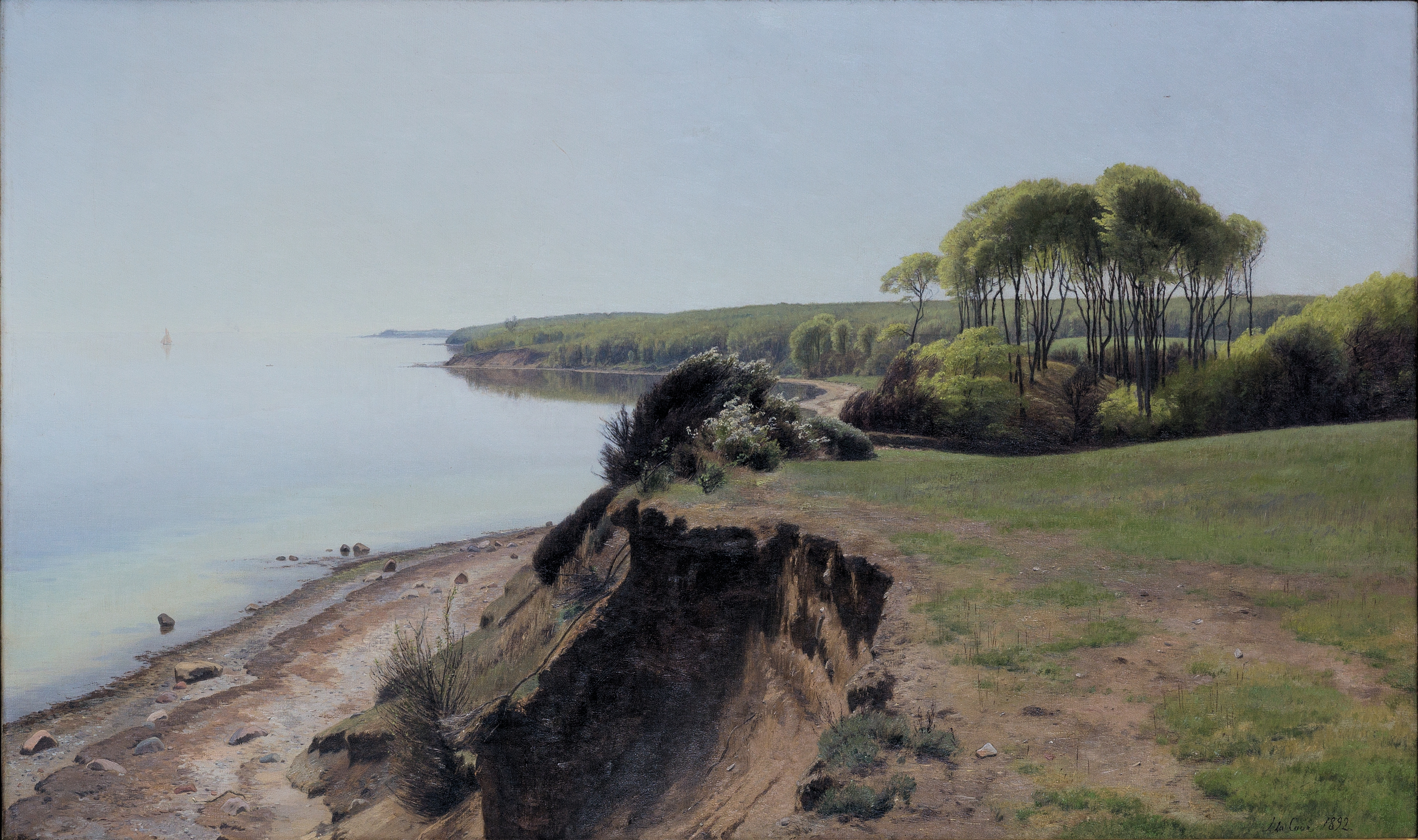
"Sømærketræerne ved Moesgård" (1892) by Janus la Cour

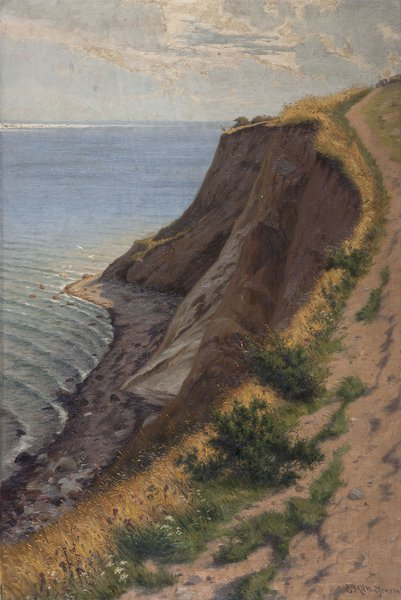
"Kysten ved Moesgård Strand" (1898) by Carl Milton Jensen

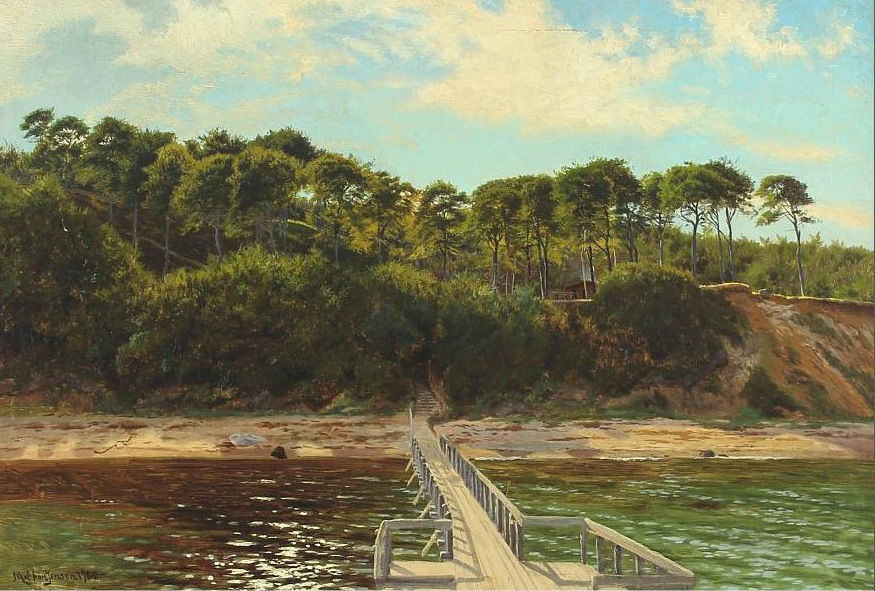
"Kystlandskab ved Moesgård" (1900) by Carl Milton Jensen
