= SOSU Aarhus =

School in Denmark

Coordinates: 56.105858°N 10.114617°E

SOSU Østjylland
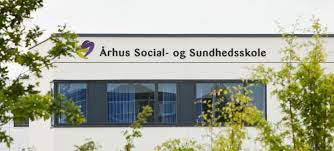
- SOSU Østjylland, Aarhus campus
- Type: Vocational school
- Rector: Niels Brun Madsen (2015)
- Administrative staff: 330
- Students: 2000 full time 6000 part-time(2015)
- Location: Aarhus, Denmark
- Website: https://www.sosuoj.dk/

SOSU Østjylland (formerly SOSU Aarhus and previously Social og Sundhedsskolen Aarhus) is a school of secondary education in Aarhus, Denmark. The school provides vocational training and educational programmes within the health sciences. SOSU Østjylland is an independent self-owning educational institution under the supervision of the state, managed by a board in conjunction with a principal who manages the day-to-day operations.

The school offers 3 basic educational programmes within social and health sciences mainly related to municipal job occupations in social health and care facilities and hospitals. The Basic Social and Health programme qualifies participants to work in the municipal social centers that provide care such as cleaning or assisting with bathing for elderly or disabled citizens. The Pedagogy Assistant programme allows participants to work in kindergartens and nurseries, assisting the trained personnel in day-to-day operations. The Basic Porter programme qualifies participants to work in hospitals assisting doctors and nurses transporting patients and equipment around.

In the summer of 2015, SOSU Aarhus took residence in a brand new campus in Skejby, next to Det Nye Universitetshospital (DNU) currently under construction.

In the summer of 2016, SOSU Aarhus and Social- og Sundhedsskolen in Silkeborg merged into one system under the name SOSU Østjylland, which covers seven municipalities (Skanderborg, Silkeborg, Favrskov, Aarhus, Syddjurs, Samsø og Odder). The main campuses are located in Aarhus and Silkeborg, as well as a branch located in Skanderborg.
