= Viby Gymnasium =

Secondary school in Aarhus, Denmark

Coordinates: 56.64737°N 10.91036°E

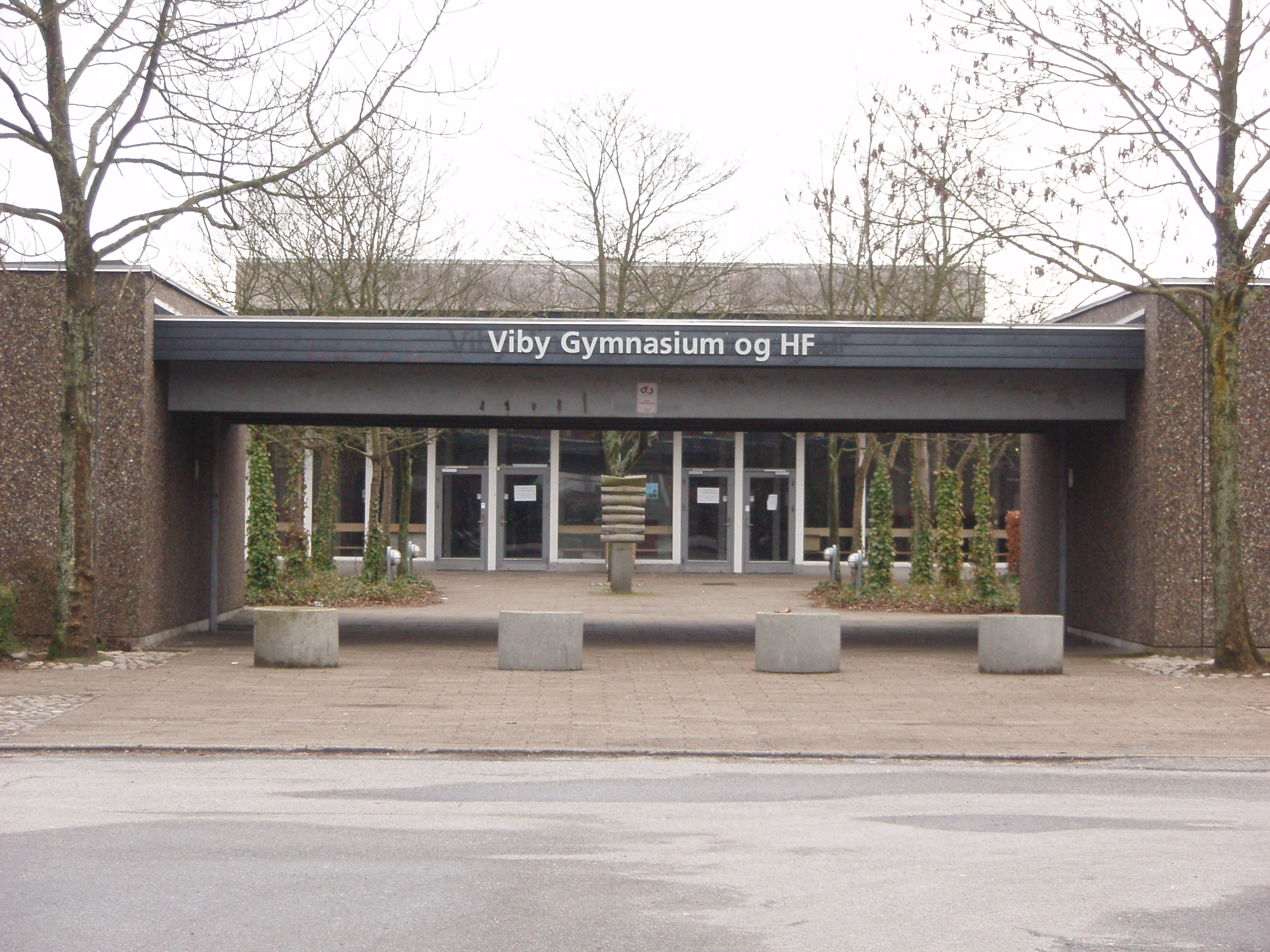
- Viby Gymnasium
- Type: Secondary education
- Established: 1965
- Rector: Lone Sandholdt Jacobsen (2015)
- Location: Aarhus, Denmark
- Website: http://www.vibygym.dk

Viby Gymnasium (formerly Viby Amtsgymnasium and Viby Gymnasium og HF) is a school of secondary education in the neighborhood Viby J in Aarhus, Denmark. The school offers the 2 year Higher Preparatory Examination (HF) programme, the 3 year Matriculation examination (STX) programme and a vocational programme (EUX).

Viby Gymnasium resulted from the planning stages of the 1970 Danish Municipal Reform. Aarhus Municipality was largely fully settled at the time but it was expected that it would be merged with surrounding municipalities so in anticipation a number of municipal government cooperated to initiate and fund the new Gymnasium. The first students started in borrowed rooms in an elementary school before construction of the buildings were completed so the school predates the buildings by 3 years. In 1992 Aarhus County decided the school should only offer the Higher Preparatory Examination (HF) programme but the STX programme was reinstated in 1996.

The school was named Viby Amtsgymnasium (English: Viby County Gymnasium) until the municipal reform of 2007 disbanded the Danish counties and it changed name to Viby Gymnasium og HF in reference to the two main study programmes offered. In 2011 the name was changed again to simply Viby Gymnasium.

== Programmes ==
The Matriculation examination (STX) programme is divided into four programmes; natural sciences, social sciences, linguistics and music each with a range of elective choices. In 2006, the school started offering Chinese for the first time along the common languages typically seen in Danish high schools such as English, German, French og Spanish.

Viby Gymnasium and VUC Aarhus are currently the only secondary educational institutions in Aarhus, offering Chinese. In Denmark, Chinese is taught at a total of 29 secondary educational institutions altogether.

== Notable alumni ==
- Erik Kuld Jensen
- Henriette Kjær
- Sune Gavnholt
