= Deaconal University College, Aarhus =

Educational institution in Aarhus, Denmark

Coordinates: 56°06′37″N 10°12′10″E

Deaconal Folk High School
- Diakonhøjskolen
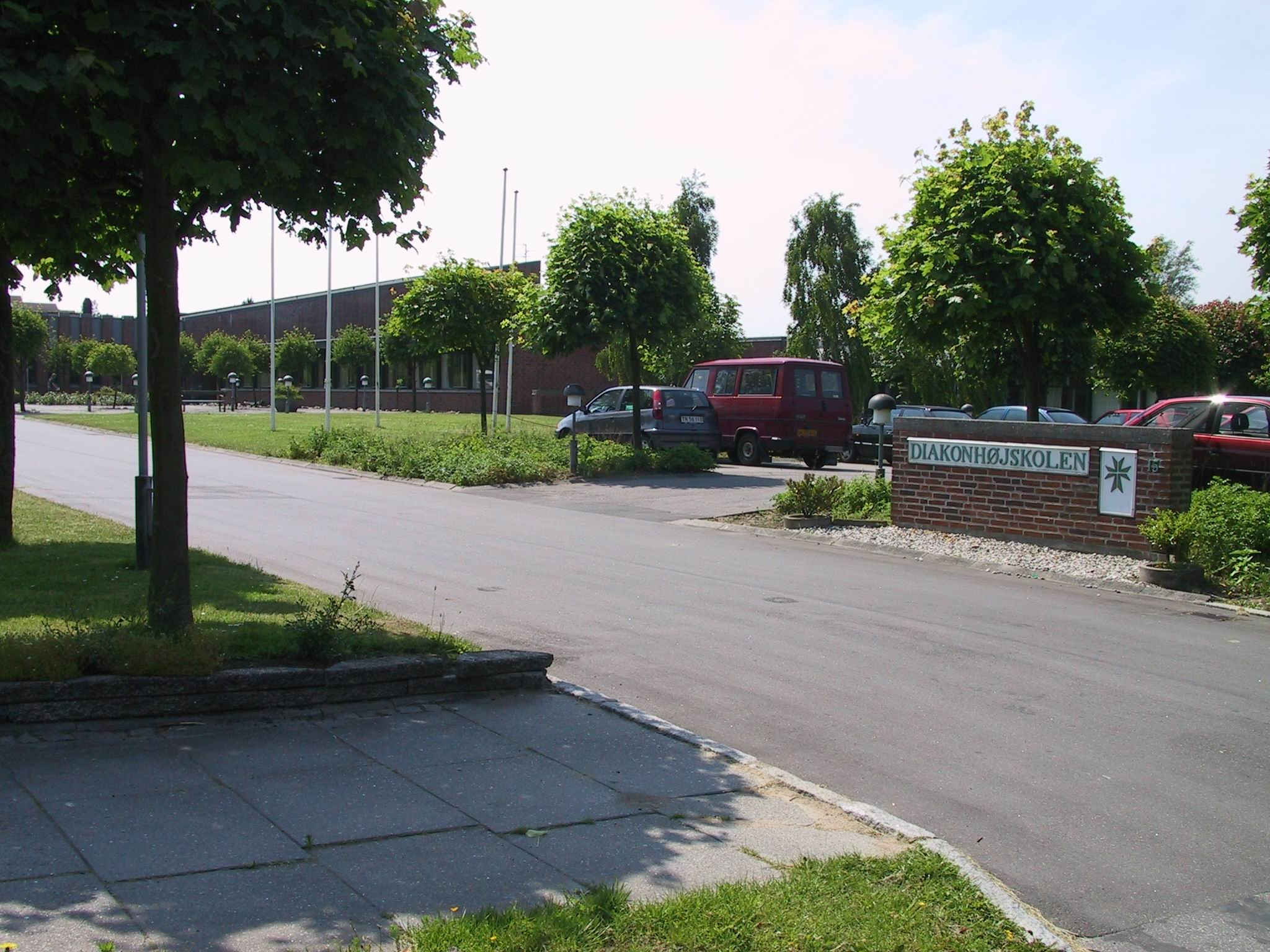
- Deaconal Folk High School
- Type: Folk High School
- Established: 1920s
- Dean: Jens Maibom Pedersen(2015)
- Administrative staff: 30
- Students: 150
- Location: Aarhus, Denmark
- Website: http://www.diakonhojskolen.dk/

Deaconal University College (Danish: Diakonhøjskolen) is a folk high school and university college in Højbjerg; a southern district of Aarhus, Denmark.

== Educational programme ==
The Deaconal University College offers a 4-year bachelor's degree programme in diaconia and social pedagogy. The education produces deaconal personnel, which in a modern Danish context are church-related social workers. Deacons educated in Denmark are lay people. Graduates from the Deaconal University College often get jobs in NGOs, such as the YMCA and YWCA social programmes, as well as state-based institutions and projects.

The Deaconal University College is based on the values and creed of the Danish National Church, which is episcopal evangelical Lutheran. However, respect and dialogue is highly valued with regard to students of other denominations who attend the school.

The school also runs a 3-month course for international students. The course aims to equip students be able to initiate, monitor and evaluate development projects and to raise awareness of social and development issues in church and society.

== History ==
The school dates from the 1920s and has eventually evolved from educating deacons for the nursing sector to providing training in different fields of social work——taking care of people with drug addictions, the mentally challenged, children and adults with special physical and/or mental needs.
