= Gustav Ludolf Martens =

German architect (1818–1882)

Gustav Ludolf Martens (20 October 1818 – 7 January 1882) was a German architect and state master builder of Kiel. Martens worked in Denmark during the 1850s century and influenced architecture in and around Aarhus in Jutland. Martens was born in the Hanseatic city of Wismar where he was trained as a carpenter. In 1837 he attended the Royal Danish Academy of Fine Arts in Copenhagen and obtained a degree in architecture in 1838. Martens moved back to Germany where he studied in Vienna and Munich before he eventually found work in Hamburg where he worked for a number of years. In the 1850s Martens moved to Kiel.

In 1857 Martens visited Aarhus and was hired to expand Vilhelmsborg Manor with a number of farms buildings. Marten's designed the buildings in Gothic Revival style which attracted attention at the time and he was subsequently hired to build the seat of the Hasle Hundred bailif F.C. Willemoes. The finished building became known for its architectural expression and interior opulence. Martens continued to do works in the area until the mid-1860s and left behind a number of characteristic buildings.

Gustav Ludolf Martens was appointed state master builder of Kiel in 1865.

== Selected works ==
- Buildings for Vilhelmsborg Manor including manager's house, stables, dairy and large barn.
- Willemoe's House for Frederik Christian Willemoes on Sønder Allé and Fredensgade, Aarhus (1858)
- Main house of Ussinggaard Manor at Horsens (1859)
- Widow's seat Stenege, Mårslet (1863)
- Two buildings at Moesgård Manor
