= Willemoe's House =

- Willemoesgård
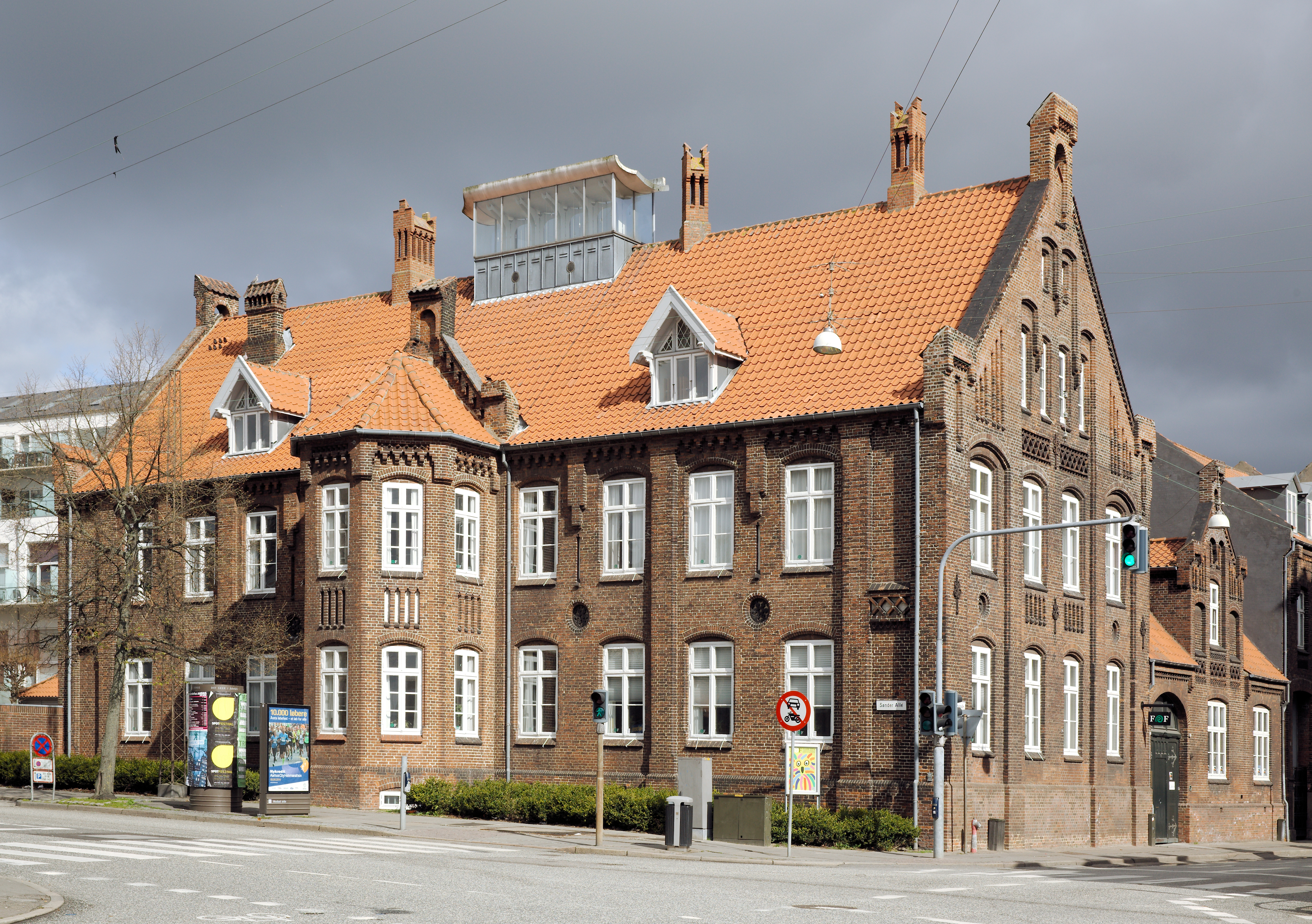
- Front facade of Willemoe's House
- Interactive map of the Willemoe's House area
- Alternative names: Bispegården (Bishop's House)

General information
- Type: Residential
- Architectural style: Gothic Revival
- Location: Aarhus, Denmark
- Coordinates: 56.15271°N 10.20825°E
- Named for: Frederik Christian Willemoes
- Completed: 1858
- Owner: Folkeligt Oplysningsforbund (FoF)

Design and construction
- Architect: Gustav Ludolf Martens

Willemoe's House (Danish: Willemoesgård) or the Bishop's House (Bispegården) is a building in Aarhus, Denmark situated in the Indre By neighborhood on the corner of Fredensgade and Sønder Alle. Willemoe's House was built in 1858 by designs of the German architect Gustav Ludolf Martens in historicist Gothic Revival style. Originally it was built to serve as the home and office for the bailif of Hads and Ning Hundred and today houses the Danish non-profit Folkeligt Oplysningsforbund (FOF).

The building is colloquially known as Willemoe's House from its original builder and owner and the Bishop's House from the lengthy period it served as the home and office of the Bishop of Aarhus.

== History ==
In the German architect Gustav Ludolf Martens designed a number of buildings in and around Aarhus including some farm buildings at the manor Vilhelmsborg. The work impressed the bailif of Hads and Ning Hundred, Frederik Christian Willemoes, who commissioned Martens. The project was the new home of Willemoes which would also function as the bailif's office. The Hads and Ning bailif remained in the building until 1886.

In 1883 the building was sold to St. Clemen's Parish and Willemoes moved out in 1886 after which the building was used as the home of the bishop of Diocese of Aarhus. The change in ownership and use came with a renovation carried out by the architect Vilhelm Theodor Walther. At the same time a bay window was added to one of the western gable by the architect Rudolf Frimodt Clausen. In 1915 one floor was added under supervision of Sophus Frederik Kühnel.

In 1984 the bishopric sold the building to Arbejdernes Fællesorganisation who originally planned on demolishing the building in order to expand Folkets Hus in Amaliegade. The plans never came to fruition and the property was instead rented out to Poul Jensen who bought it in 1979. Since 2010 it has been rented out to Folkeligt Oplysningsforbund (FOF).

== Architecture ==
Willemoe's House was constructed in Gothic Revival style and is one of the only examples of that style in Aarhus. The building has been renovated and remodeled several times but the overall architectural expression remain largely the same. It is a brick building with a large bay window facing west and two pointed dormer windows. The most characteristic feature is the large roof lantern installed in 1987 when a conference room was established on the roof floor of the building. The architects Inger and Johannes Exner used the Cupola Room at Charlottenborg Palace in Copenhagen and other European Baroque rooms as inspiration and created the lantern as a way to bring light into the otherwise mostly windowless room. The walls are clad in combinations of reflective plaster and tinfoil with the intention of creating diverse lighting situations dependent on weather and season.
