= Endebjerg =

Excavation site in Denmark

- Location of the site in Denmark
- 55°52′22.4328″N 10°38′47.8824″E
- Type: Settlement
- Periods: Neolithic (Funnelbeaker Culture); Late Bronze Age; Early Iron Age; Viking Age; Present times (19th century to modern day)
- Location: Samsø, Denmark

Site notes
- Excavation dates: 1988, 1989, 1990, 2017, 2018

Endebjerg is the location of an excavation site set in the middle of farmland on the island of Samsø, Denmark. A series of excavations have shown that this site has been occupied by a variety of cultures since the Early Neolithic period. The site was first officially excavated in 1988 under Christian Adamsen. It was most recently excavated in the summer of 2018 by a joint task force of the Harvard University Viking Studies Program and Moesgaard Museum, led by Peter Jensen.

== Location ==
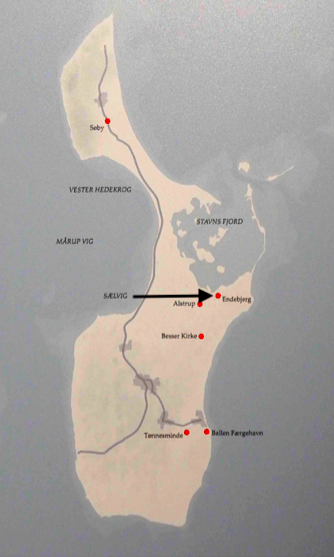
Map of Samsø showing Endebjerg

Endebjerg is located on a hill on the southern side of Stavns Fjord. Dating to the 19th century, the name means Final(ende) Mountain/Hill (bjerg). While not notably tall or steep, a wide view of the neighboring fjord is visible from atop Endebjerg. Throughout the Viking Age, possibly later, the water likely stretched down the west side (closer to Jutland) of the hill, creating a close connection from the settlement to the fjord. This made Endebjerg an ideal location for a settlement. Inhabitants had easy coastal access for trade and fishing; furthermore, they could easily see would-be traders or attackers from afar and prepare the proper response.

== Discovery ==
In the late 1980s, the land owner of the farm noticed his wheat grew taller and healthier in small, specific areas. These unnatural clusters of darker, fertile soil indicated previous human activity. Filled in holes will create spots of rich soil visibly different from the rest of the topsoil and subsoil. The farmer contacted the Samsø Museum for guidance. Further investigation showed that aerial photographs from the late '70s revealed dark spots and pits that could potentially have an archaeological context. Around some of these spots, farmers reported turning up charred material and fire-cracked rocks while plowing. Lis Nymark, then director of the Samsø Museum, conducted a preliminary examination of Endebjerg, finding and partially excavating the pithouse marked C1 in the 2018 excavation plans. These discoveries led to the 1988-1990 excavations. The site was first officially excavated in 1988 by student-archaeologist Christian Adamsen, via the Samsø Museum. Further excavations under this group occurred in 1989 and 1990. In 2017, Moesgaard Museum searched for anomalies signaling buildings under the mud layer. In 2018, the Harvard University Viking Studies Program spent three weeks excavating the site.

== 1988–1990 excavations ==
=== 1988 season ===
The first excavation at Endebjerg occurred in the Fall of 1988. Three and a half pithouses were excavated, as well as two of the roof-bearing post holes and some of the wall posts belonging to a longhouse dated to the Late Iron Age or Viking Age. The longhouse was estimated to be around 27 meters long, and contain six sets of roof-bearing posts. This longhouse was the first one found on the island of Samsø. This excavation was led by Christian Adamsen, then a student at the University of Copenhagen. It also employed a metal detector, which found very little of note.

According to Adamsen's article, "Stavns Fjord i jernalder og vikingetid" (1995), there were a number of significant finds unearthed during this excavation. Most importantly, pithouse C4 contained hundreds of fish bones, which were the first ones found in a rural settlement in Denmark. This was due to the use of a sieve during excavations. The fish bones were found to belong to medium-sized cod, fish which were likely caught in the bay near Endebjerg rather than out at sea. Other notable finds included 2 1/2 glass beads. The 1988 excavation also turned up several artifacts that were evidence of trade: a hooked tag, from either York or Winchester, in England; a cutting knife, made from iron that came from Norway; and a rim shard made of glass that was Frankish in origin. In addition to these finds, there were many pieces of ceramic, some land animal bones, and artifacts made of iron, including a key, nails, and rivets.

=== 1989 season ===
The second excavation occurred the following year, in 1989, when the Samsø Museum and University of Copenhagen returned to Endebjerg after the promising returns of the previous year. Students excavated multiple pithouses as well as some postholes that were part of a longhouse. There were multiple loom weights found in one of the pithouses. In addition, the excavation found multiple whetstones made of black shist that looked to be Norwegian in origin. Other finds from the sieve included additional glass beads and more fish bone fragments.

=== 1990 season ===
In 1990, Samso Museum returned to the site at Endebjerg, this time to dig 6 test trenches in a nearby field, in order to determine if there were any other signs of human habitation in the area. The pattern of features exposed by the trial trenches suggested that Endebjerg had multiple settlements throughout its history. Multiple cooking pits, and several post holes that were suspected to belong to the longhouse were also found. During this excavation, the most significant find was that one of the cooking pits was filled with Bronze Age ceramics.

== 2017–2018 excavations ==
=== 2017 season ===
In 2017, archaeologists from Moesgaard Museum conducted a magnetometer survey on the site in Endebjerg to see if there were any traces of a building underneath the top soil. During the survey some clear anomalies were detected that were interpreted as possible pits. The anomalies were mostly clustered on the eastern side of the hill, near where Christian Adamsen had previously found the settlement. On five of these anomalies, test holes were dug to determine if there was any archaeological context to be found. In three of the test holes, archaeological context was discovered, which meant these areas were of particular interest.

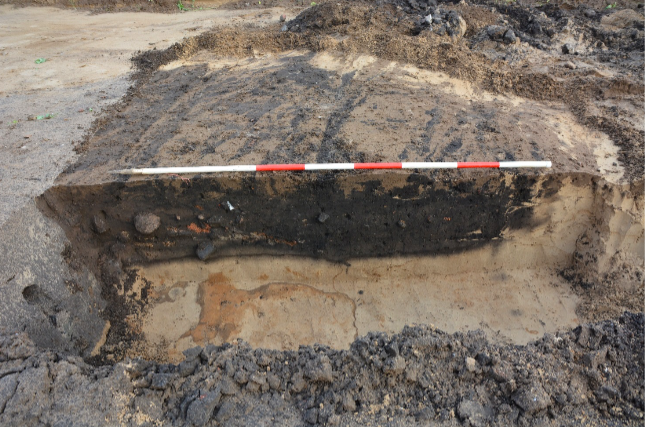
A cut through half of a pithouse. One side is excavated, leaving the soil layers visible.

=== 2018 season ===
==== Pithouse C1 ====
Located just southeast of the longhouse discovered in 1988, C1 was the first pithouse excavated.

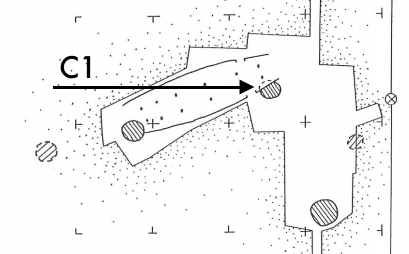

Major finds from the excavation of the pithouse included a fairly intact ceramic handle piece as well as several disruptions in the outer edge of the pithouse. While one of the disruptions appears to be a mouse's burrow, the other is much more systematic and deliberate: likely a remnant of the Nymark excavation. In addition, there were several Modern era shards of glass found that were probably left from that excavation. On the floor layer of the pithouse, there was a pig's tooth, a piece of iron slag, multiple ceramic pieces and rim shards. It is likely that some of the artifacts that may have been in the pithouse were excavated by Nymark.

For information on the excavation procedure for pithouses, see Pithouse Excavation Procedure.

==== Pithouse C2 ====
Located on the southern edge of the dig site, C2 was undisturbed until the 2018 excavation. This pithouse had two distinct floor layers, possibly due to the seasonal usage of pithouses; workers would create a fresh floor layer to cover previous one.

In the first layer excavated, a glass bead from the Viking Age was discovered through sieving. A long trench running north from the pithouse was also discovered; soil colorization determined it to be younger than the pithouse, running over it instead of into the structure. In the second layer excavated, the number of bone and ceramic finds increased. The northeast quadrant of C2 yielded many animal teeth and a jawbone, most likely belonging to a horse. The first piece of ornamented, stamped ceramic found on Samsø was also excavated from the northern half. In the third layer excavated, a loom weight was found on the northern half, while a large deposit of ceramic pieces and a small limb bone were found on the southern half. In the younger floor layer (about 55 cm below the topsoil), a large piece of iron, presumably a handle, was found on the southern half. The second floor layer (about 62cm below the topsoil) yielded more ceramics. In both floor layers, unfired loom weights were also found. Throughout the entire excavation of the pithouse, pockets of charcoal, animal teeth, and fire-cracked rock were discovered.

==== Pithouse C4 ====
Located on the western edge of the dig site, pithouse C4 was chosen to be excavated based on the 1989 excavation reports, which reported half of C4 being excavated and the other half left undisturbed.

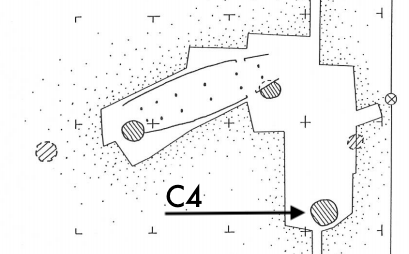

In the 1988 excavation, fishbones and ceramics were reported to have been found in the side that was excavated. However, the 2018 excavation found that it was probable that the whole pit had been previously excavated, with the discovery of a plastic coffee stirrer and cigarette butts in the "unexcavated" portion of the pithouse providing clear evidence of modern era activity. While half a glass bead was also found in the pithouse, it is likely that it was merely missed by the previous excavation. When the old profile wall was excavated, teeth and ceramics were discovered, indicating that the pithouse did contain a wealth of finds when it was excavated initially. In addition, an iron piece that may be a key was found during the excavation of C4, which could potentially match an iron lock found by Lis Nymark.

==== Longhouse C5 ====
In the 2018 excavation, the excavation of the previously unknown longhouse started with a series of postholes that had once held roof bearing posts. The excavation found only three pairs of roof bearing posts, even though additional postholes were searched for on both sides of the existing three pairs. This suggests that the longhouse at Endebjerg was a very short longhouse. While excavating these postholes, a piece of ceramic dating to the late Iron Age was found. This and the shape of the longhouse suggest that the longhouse was likely Viking Age.

==== Posthole A12 ====
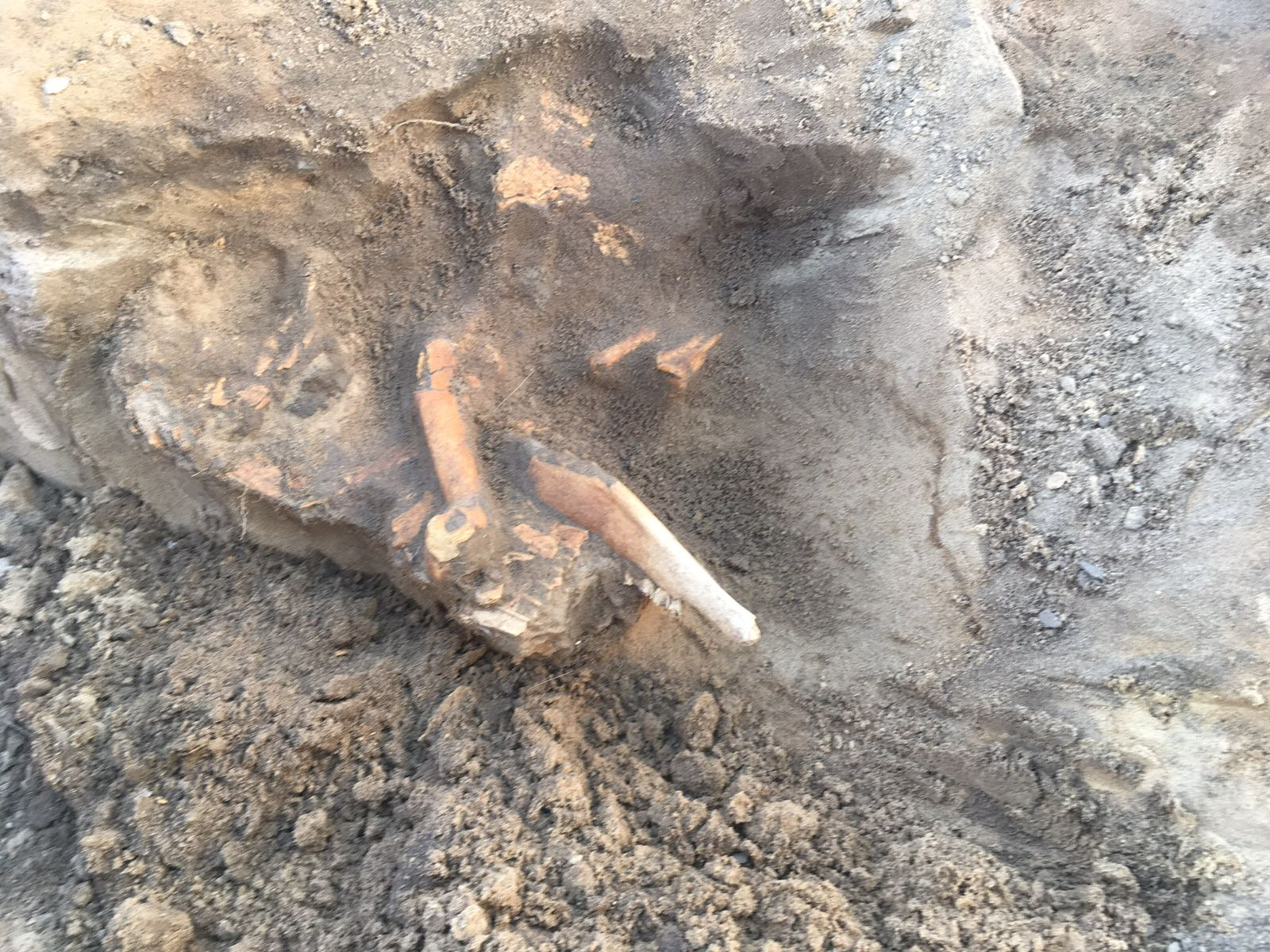
A goat mandible among other animal bones found in posthole A12

During the excavations a series of postholes were discovered in and around some of the pit and longhouses. In archaeology, a post hole is a circular patch of discolored dirt lying underneath the topsoil that once may have held a wall, supporting, or roof bearing post. One of the more interesting postholes was Posthole A12. What made this posthole hole unusual was the discovery of a series of bones from a variety of different animals including a well preserved goat mandible as well as the fact that it was not found in context with any of the longhouses or pithouses.

==== Cooking Pits ====
During the course of the 2018 excavation, multiple cooking pits were excavated a short distance away from the longhouse and pithouses. Cooking pits were holes dug into the ground and filled with stones that were heated and used to cook meat, factors that can help date when the site was inhabited. Any organic materials remaining in the cooking pit, including animal products or grains, can be assessed using carbon-14 dating to approximate the time period the cooking pit was used. During the excavation, the darkest soil, almost pitch black in color, was saved and flotated. Unfortunately, no dateable artifacts were found after flotation.

== Significance ==
=== Occupation ===
The difference and breadth of the finds found in all four excavations suggests that this settlement was occupied by a series of cultures. A series of flint finds were found that showed evidence of flintknapping that can be dated to the Funnelbeaker culture of the Neolithic period. Ceramic shards found in one of the pithouses can be dated to the Germanic Iron age, further backed up with the discovery of a series of iron nails. In addition to this the excavation teams found artifacts including the ceramic handle of pithouse C1 that could be dated to the late iron age and Viking age periods.

=== Trade ===
Endebjerg is important to the study of Viking activity on Samsø because of the evidence of trade found in the excavations. The discovery of these relatively high-end trade goods points to an unusually well off upper middle class settlement rather than a normal, lower class rural settlement. The strategic positioning of Samsø meant that Endebjerg was probably an important trading site that exerted some control over the sea routes that ran through the channels on either side of the island. One notable feature of Samsø is the Kanhave canal that ran through Samsø to connect the channels on either side. Using this canal, the construction of which has been dated to about 726 AD using dendrochronology, the inhabitants could easily deploy their fleets to control trade and for defense. Endebjerg was ideally situated to survey the activity around the canal and in the fjord. The building of the Kanhave canal and other construction projects during the same time period may have signified that power in Denmark was much more centralized earlier than previously thought.

=== Finds ===
The finds and the architectural features of the site also point to the special significance of the site in understanding the history of Samsø itself. The longhouse excavated in 1988-89 was the first longhouse discovered on the island. The fish bones found in pithouse C4 were the first discovered in any Danish rural settlement. In the 2018 excavation, the discovery of the first ceramic shard with ornamentation on the island also pointed to the presence of the ceramic industry. In post hole A12, the unusual discovery of the bones of a goat (including a relatively well-preserved mandible) may point to religious activity. The loom weight found in pithouse C2 also supports the idea of a textile industry that likely made clothes for trade and sails for ships. The iron slag found at pithouse C1 also demonstrates that there was an active metal treatment and smithing industry at the settlement. The presence of multiple pithouses and artisan industries provides further support the evidence of this site being a wealthier settlement.
