= Peder Mortensen =

Danish archaeologist (1934–2022)

- Born: 7 May 1934
- Died: 8 December 2022 (aged 88)

Academic background
- Education: Aarhus University

Academic work
- Discipline: Archaeologist
- Sub-discipline: Prehistoric archaeology; Near Eastern archaeology
- Institutions: Moesgaard Museum; Danish Institute in Damascus; University of Copenhagen

Peder Mortensen (7 May 1934 – 8 December 2022) was a Danish archaeologist specialized in the Palaeolithic and Neolithic periods of southwest Asia.

== Education and career ==
Mortensen was born on 7 May 1934 in Jutland. He studied prehistoric archaeology at Aarhus University and graduated with an MA degree in 1960. He was a curator at the National Museum of Denmark from 1961–1968, the director of the Moesgaard Museum from 1982–1996, director for the Danish Institute in Damascus and cultural advisor to the Danish embassy in Damascus 1996–2001, and then honorary professor in Middle Eastern studies at University of Copenhagen.

== Recognition ==
Mortensen was a member of the Royal Danish Academy of Sciences and Letters and a member of the Academia Europea.

In 2004, he was honored by the festschrift From handaxe to Khan : essays presented to Peder Mortensen on the occasion of his 70th birthday.

== Books ==
Mortensen's books include:

- Tell Shimshara: The Hassuna Period (1970)
- The Hilly Flanks and Beyond: Essays on the Prehistory of Southwestern Asia Presented to Robert J. Braidwood, 15 November 1982 (edited with T. Cuyler Young Jr. and Philip J. Smith, 1983)
- Bayt al-'Aqqad. The History and Restoration of a House in Old Damascus (2005)
- Excavations at Tepe Guran. The Neolithic Period (2014). Peeters, Leuven
- Mount Nebo. An Archaeological Survey of the Region. Volume I: The Palaeolithic and Neolithic Periods (2013) (with Ingolf Thuesen and Inge Demant Mortensen)
- Mount Nebo. An Archaeological Survey of the Region. Volume II: The Early Bronze Age (2019) (with Ingolf Thuesen and Inge Demant Mortensen)
- Eyes on a Street in Cairo. (2017). Copenhagen, Orbis Publishing House
