= Moesgaard Museum =

Coordinates: 56°05′13.3″N 10°13′34.6″E

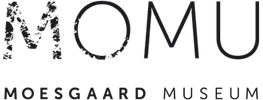

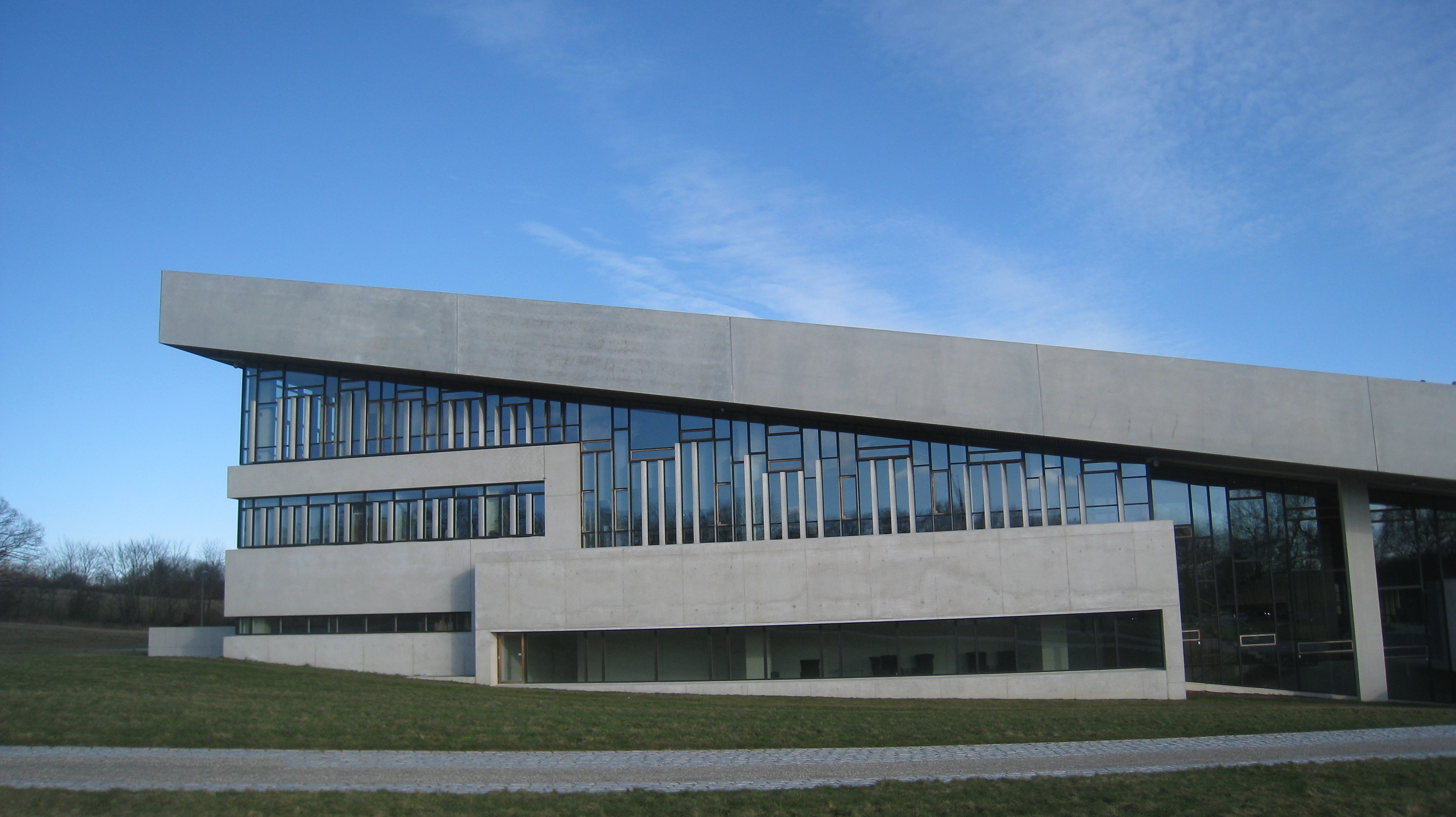
- Established: 1970
- Location: Moesgård Allé 15, 8330 Beder; Denmark
- Type: Cultural history museum, archaeological museum
- Director: Mads Kähler Holst
- Owner: Aarhus University
- Website: Moesgaard Museum

Moesgaard Museum (MOMU) is a Danish regional museum dedicated to archaeology and ethnography. It is located east of Beder, a village and suburb of Aarhus, Denmark.

MOMU cooperates with the Institute of Prehistoric Archaeology, Medieval and Renaissance Archaeology and Anthropology at Aarhus University. The main part of the museum's archaeological collection is of Danish origin. In addition, the Ethnographical Collections contain almost 50,000 artifacts from all over the world. They are used both for research and exhibitions. The collection also contains photographic material, films, and sound recordings. The museum's exhibitions present several unrivaled archaeological findings from Denmark's ancient past, among others the Grauballe Man, the world's best preserved bog body, and the large ritual weapon caches from Illerup Ådal, testifying to the power struggles and warfare of the Iron Age. The collection also contains seven local rune stones. Temporary exhibitions at the museum also display examples of the world's cultural heritage.

== Exhibitions ==
A large new museum building, designed by Henning Larsen Architects, housing both public exhibitions and the headquarters for academic activities, was inaugurated in 2014. The museum building is constructed around a broad central staircase. The upper levels show changing exhibits of history and culture from around the world, while the lower levels house the permanent exhibitions on Danish, Scandinavian, and European history and culture.

The permanent indoor exhibitions comprise the Stone Age, Bronze Age, Iron Age, and Viking Age as they unfolded in Denmark and Scandinavia, as well as an exhibition on Medieval Denmark from c. 1050 to 1536. They are highly interactive in several languages and designed to appeal to as broad an audience as possible, without losing academic depth and accuracy. The prehistoric exhibitions include these notable artifacts:

- Model of a large Bronze Age barrow Borum Eshøj
- Thousands of items from the Iron-Age votive site at Illerup Ådal
- Copies of the Golden horns of Gallehus (Guldhornene)
- Grauballe Man, a bog body from Grauballe, Denmark
- Various runestones, including the Mask Stone (Maskestenen)
- Snaptun Stone, often identified as a depiction of Loki
- Hørning Stave Church, a reconstructed early Danish stave church

== The historical landscape ==
As an open-air museum, the landscape surrounding Moesgaard Museum displays different epochs and eras of Denmark's past, from ancient to modern times. A larger part of the woodlands represents different prehistoric climatic epochs of the Holocene, and a number of reconstructed buildings are strewn across the landscape, stretching all the way to the beach and shores in the east. The buildings include several relocated tumuli from the Neolithic and the Bronze Age, a house from the early Iron Age, and several Medieval buildings, some of which are still in use.

=== Stave church ===
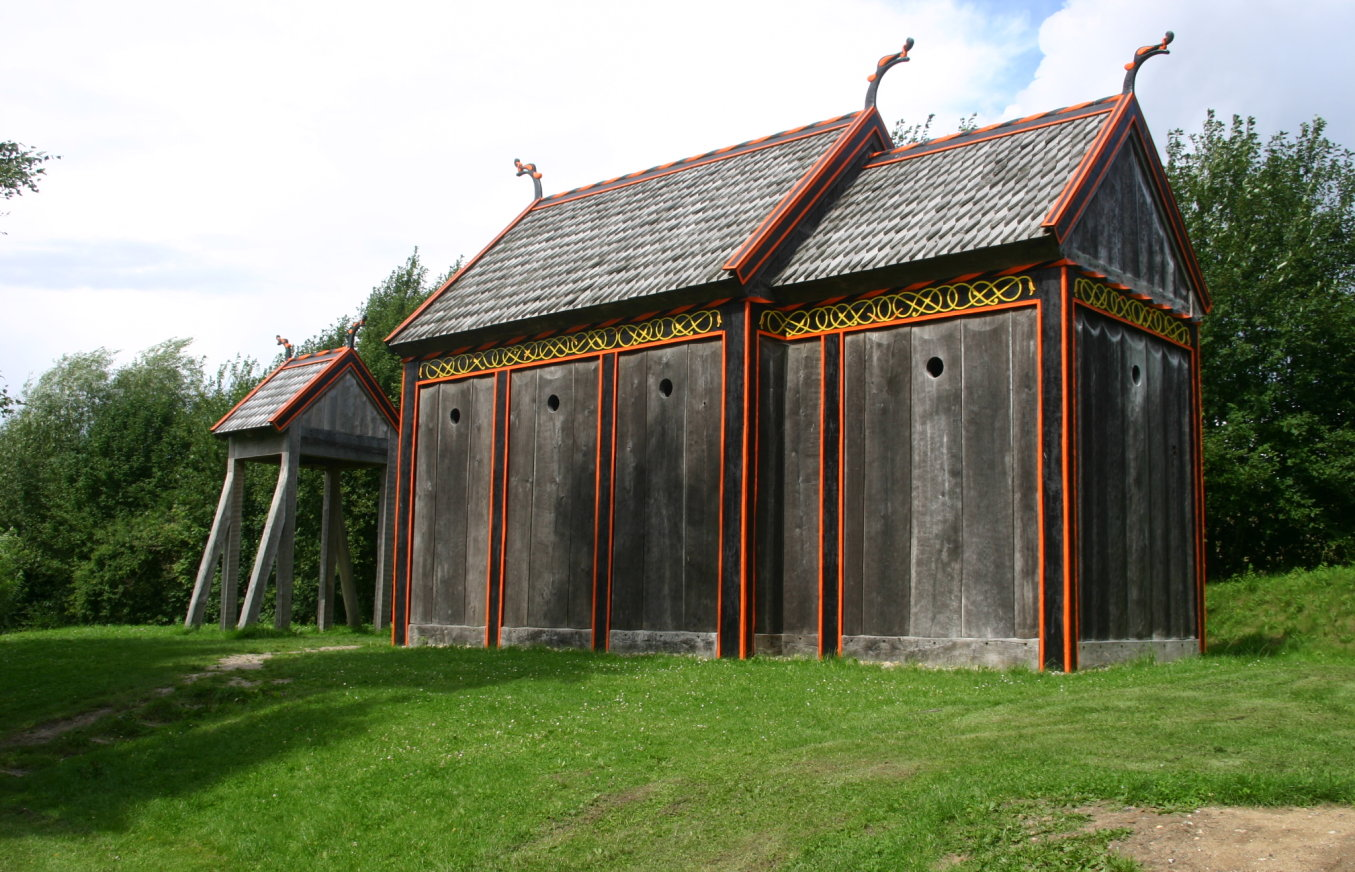
Reconstructed Hørning Stave Church

On a small hill just southeast of the new museum building, a reconstruction of Hørning Stave Church, a stave church from the Viking Age, was erected. None of the original stave churches in Denmark have survived, but the floor and post-holes from a Viking Age stave church were excavated under the present Hørning Church near Randers in 1960. Compared to the medieval stone churches, it was a quite small building; 31 feet long and 15 feet wide. Also preserved from the stave church in Hørning was a portion of the so-called hammer-beam, the horizontal beam just under the roof-projection, which held the vertical planks. The "Hørning-plank" was found as early as 1887 during a restoration of the walling of the present church. It can be seen in the National Museum of Denmark. On the outside, the hammer-beam from Hørning was ornamented with writhing serpents, a characteristic of the Late Viking Period. On the basis of the growth-rings in the timber, the stave-church has been dated to about 1060, the transition from the Viking Age Period to the Middle Ages.

At the excavation site in Hørning, traces of a bell frame were discovered. This has also been reconstructed just in front of the church entrance. The church bell has been cast at Moesgaard, following a 900-year-old description of bell casting. It is a replica of the almost 800-year-old bell from Smollerup church near Viborg.

=== Moesgaard Manor and surroundings ===
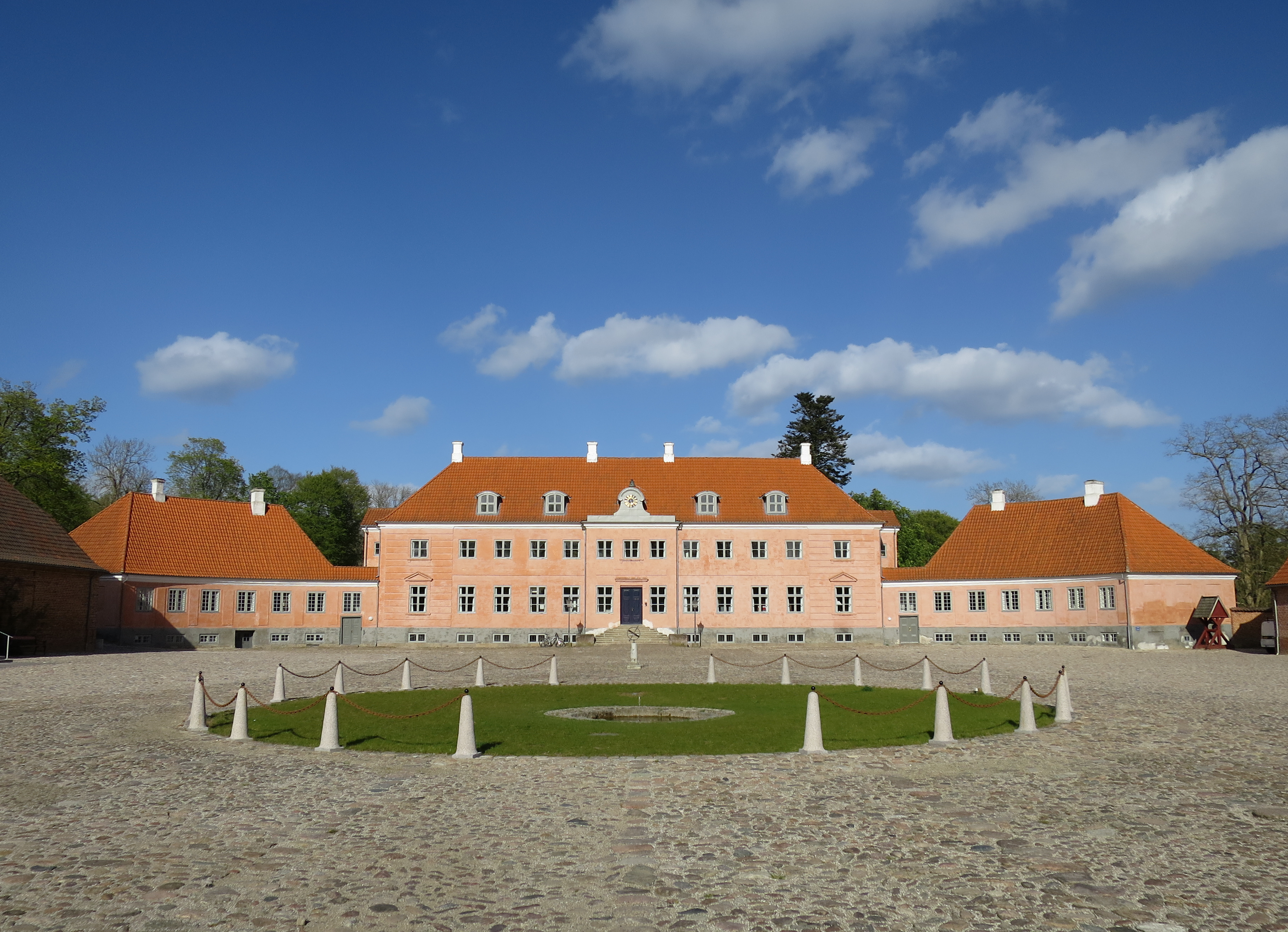
Moesgaard Manor

The estate of Moesgaard covers 100 hectares of park, forest, open fields, and shoreline, and extends from the museum buildings down to the Bay of Aarhus. The former manor house at Moesgaard Manor was constructed in 1780–84 by nobleman and diplomat Frederik Güldencrone (1741–1788), based on plans by architect Christian Joseph Zuber (1736–1802). Torkild Christian Dahl (1807–1872) took ownership of the manor in 1844. In 1960, Århus County bought the manor and estate. The former manor house now houses a department of the Institutes of Archaeology and Anthropology of Aarhus University.

In the park is also a house from Thailand which was donated to Moesgaard Museum by the Kingdom of Thailand in 1975. The house is around 100 years old and originally from Ayutthaya, the old capital of Siam, 200 km north of Bangkok. The house was once a part of a larger building complex.

From the manor park, a 4 km long Prehistoric Track starts off, running through the estate all the way to the sea in the east. A short walk from the park, an Iron Age house has been reconstructed. It is a typical farmhouse from 200 to 300 AD, based on a settlement at Tofting near Husum, just south of the Danish border. This house type was common throughout Northern Europe in its day. The building is 16 m long, and both humans and cattle lived under the same roof.

The open fields and slopes below the manor are grazed by sheep, goats, and horses, and present a handful of ancient tumuli. In the forest of Moesgaard Skov further east, it is possible to visit the old timber-framed Medieval water mill of Moesgård Forest Mill (Skovmøllen), powered by the stream of Giber Å. The first reference to the mill dates from 1590, but all the buildings were rebuilt, and an overshot mill-wheel was installed in 1785. An extra story was added to the mill house in 1852. Production ceased in 1910, but the mill is still in full working order as both a saw and granary mill. The milling business was initiated again by a team of volunteers in 2000, and guided tours are held throughout the year. There is a restaurant in the attached buildings, and Skovmøllen has a long history of recreational activities.

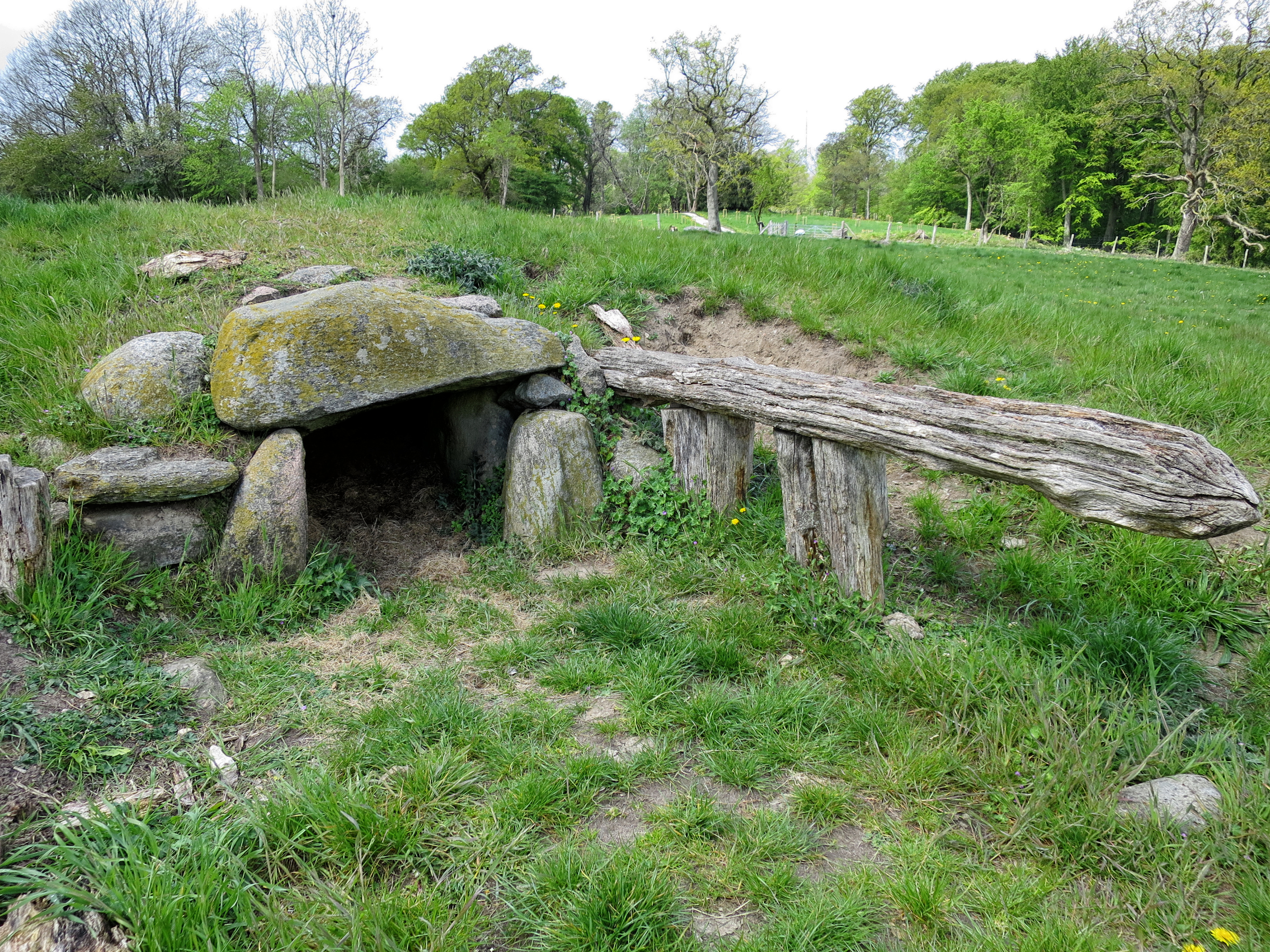
Remains of a Stone Age passage grave

Near Moesgaard Beach is a reconstruction of a Stone Age cult-building from the Funnel Beaker Period, around 2500 BC. The original house was located near two dolmens and a passage grave at Tustrup in Northern Djursland. It is believed that the building served religious ceremonies – perhaps as a resting place for the dead, until the flesh had decayed and the bones could be moved into surrounding graves. The original wooden building burnt to the ground at some point, and parts of the roof sheeting of birch bark with turf cover collapsed inwards with the burnt wall planking. 26 richly decorated offering vessels and pottery ladles representing the golden age of pottery in Danish prehistory were found inside the collapsed building. The ceramics can be seen on display at the Moesgaard Museum.

Further east, at the mouth of the Giber Å stream on the beach, is an old fisherman's house from 1856. The residents used to serve the estate until 1935, when Aarhus Municipality acquired the land. Moesgård beach is popular in the summer with people looking for a sunbath, recreational watersport activities or a place for picnics. Public toilets and a kiosk selling ice cream and fast food can be found here.

In 2019, the landscape around Moesgaard Museum was used for the IAAF 2019 Cross Country World Championships. The route included the museum buildings grass covered roof.

=== Prehistoric Trail ===
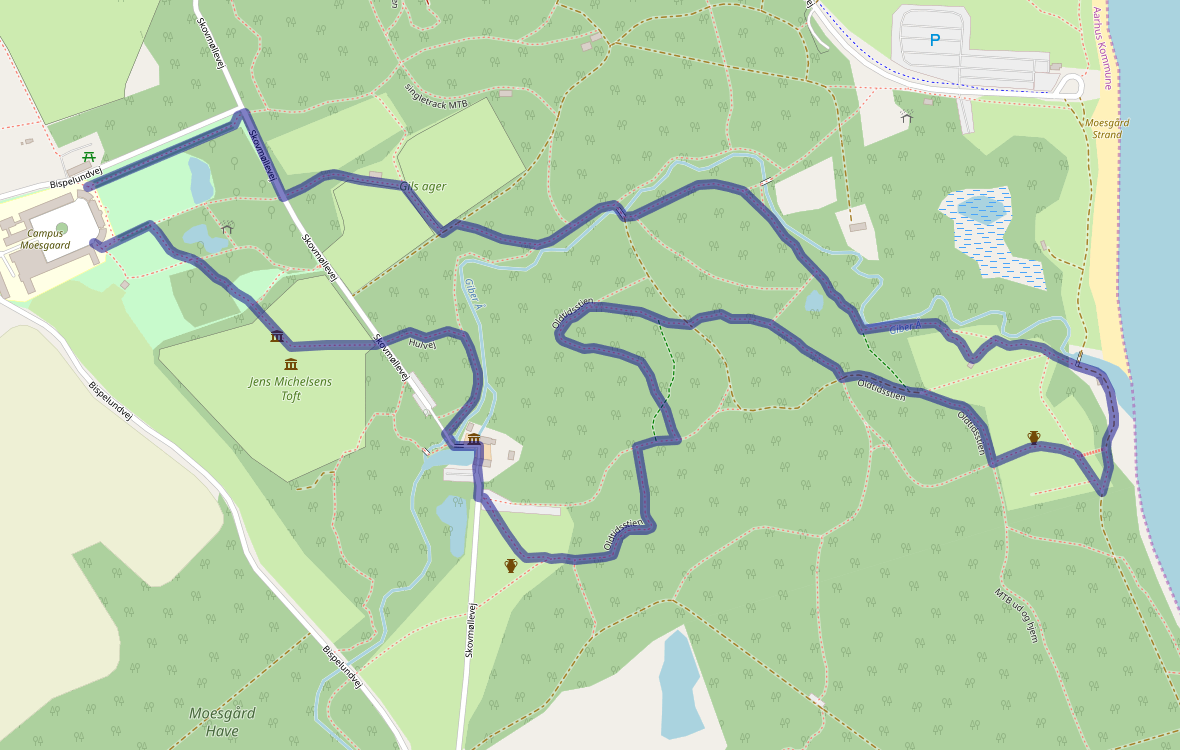
Route map

The Prehistoric Trail is a 4 km trail that runs from the Moesgaard Manor to the beach and back, transecting most of the 100-hectare area of garden, park, forest, fields, and beaches that is owned by the Moesgaard Museum. Along the route are several reconstructed prehistoric buildings and burial mounds. The trail also passes through the Prehistoric Forest, an area divided into sections representing the successive forest types of Denmark since the ice sheets of the last ice age retreated. Points of interest – both historical and biological – are explained on information boards.

For the most part, the trail is marked by large white stones adorned with a red dot.

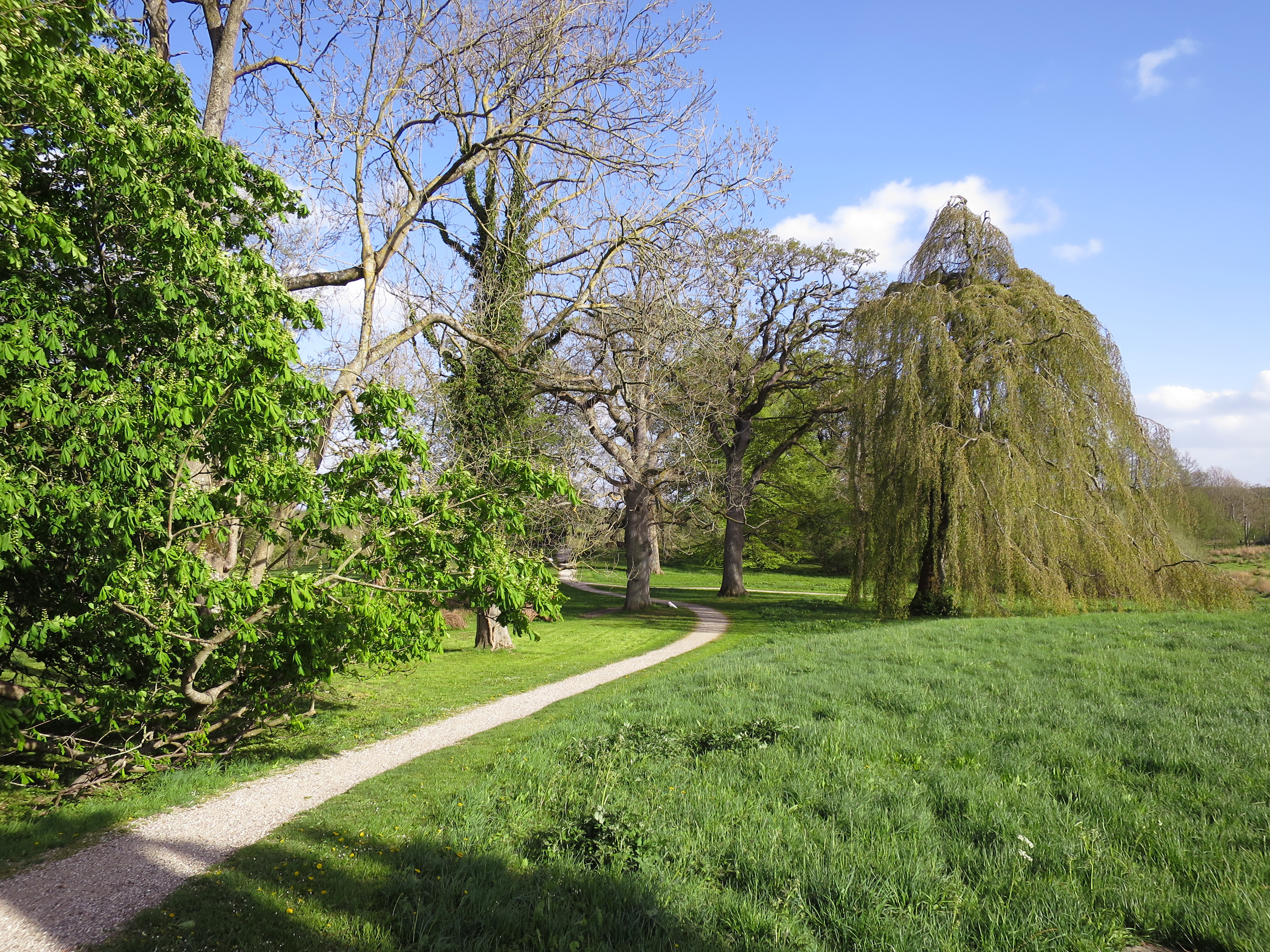
Manor park

The Prehistoric Trail leads visitors through the baroque-styled Manor Park, laid out around the same time Moesgaard Manor was constructed (in the 1770s) down to the field shown on maps as "Jens Michelsens toft". Here are several stone burial chambers from various parts of Denmark illustrating how traditions of burial changed over time during the Stone and Bronze Ages. These were relocated here and carefully reconstructed when their original sites were lost to development. The field is grazed by Gotland sheep in the summer to keep the vegetation around the burial chambers down.

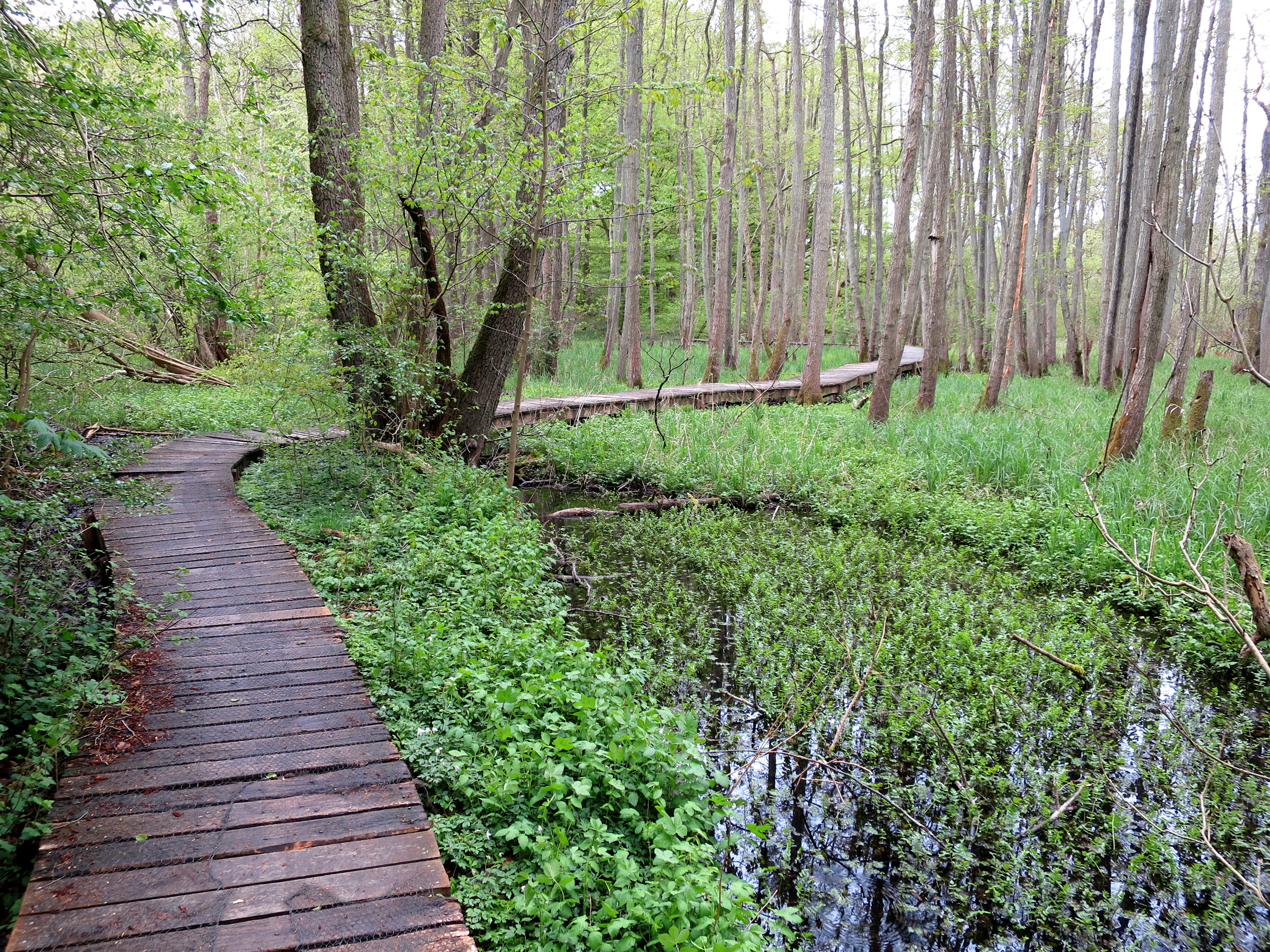
The prehistoric forest. A footbridge passes through the swampy areas.

The next points of interest along the trail include the old watermill, which today also houses a restaurant, and the ruin of a long barrow. The route then leads into the ancient woodland, the forest swamp, which is crossed on a footbridge. Among the Red Alders are tussocks rich in herbs. The trail continues through The Prehistoric Forest, which the museum planted in 1964 to illustrate the ecological succession in the forests of Denmark from the Stone Age until today. Thus, the forest is divided into the periods birch and pine period (9550–8250 BC), Hazel and Pine (8250–7500 BC), Early Lime (7000–3800 BC), Late Lime (3800–700 BC) and Beech (700 BC – today). The trail exits the Beech period close to the beach.

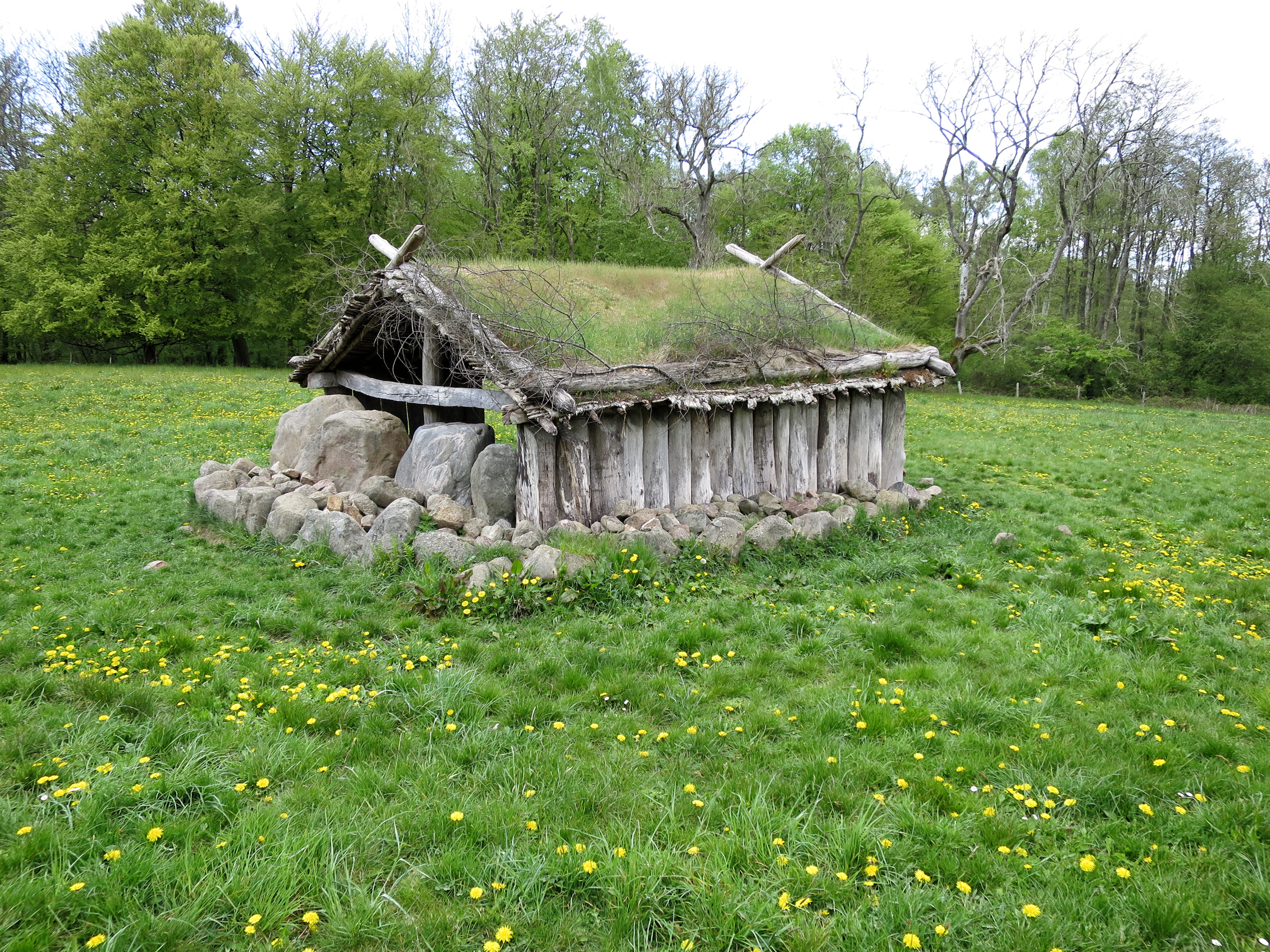
The Tustrup House

From the beach, the trail leads back west through the forest past reconstructed houses, including The Tustrup House. The original house was located in the town of Tustrup on the peninsula of Djursland north of Aarhus. This house was probably used for religious ceremonies and perhaps for storing dead bodies until all that remained were bones, which could then be placed in a passage grave or stone barrow. The Prehistoric Trail ends back at the Manor, which nowadays houses the museum administration, Aarhus University offices, and student facilities. There is no public access to these buildings. However, just across the road is the last point of interest on The Prehistoric Trail, the reconstructed stave church from a town about 35 km to the north of Moesgaard.

== Gallery ==
=== from the museum ===
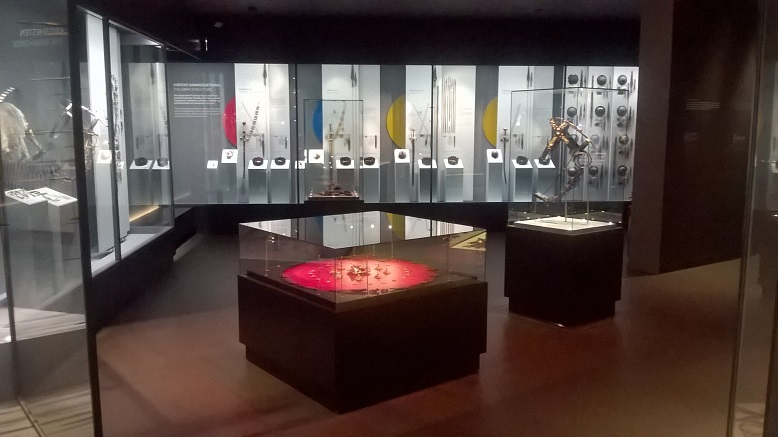
Museum display case

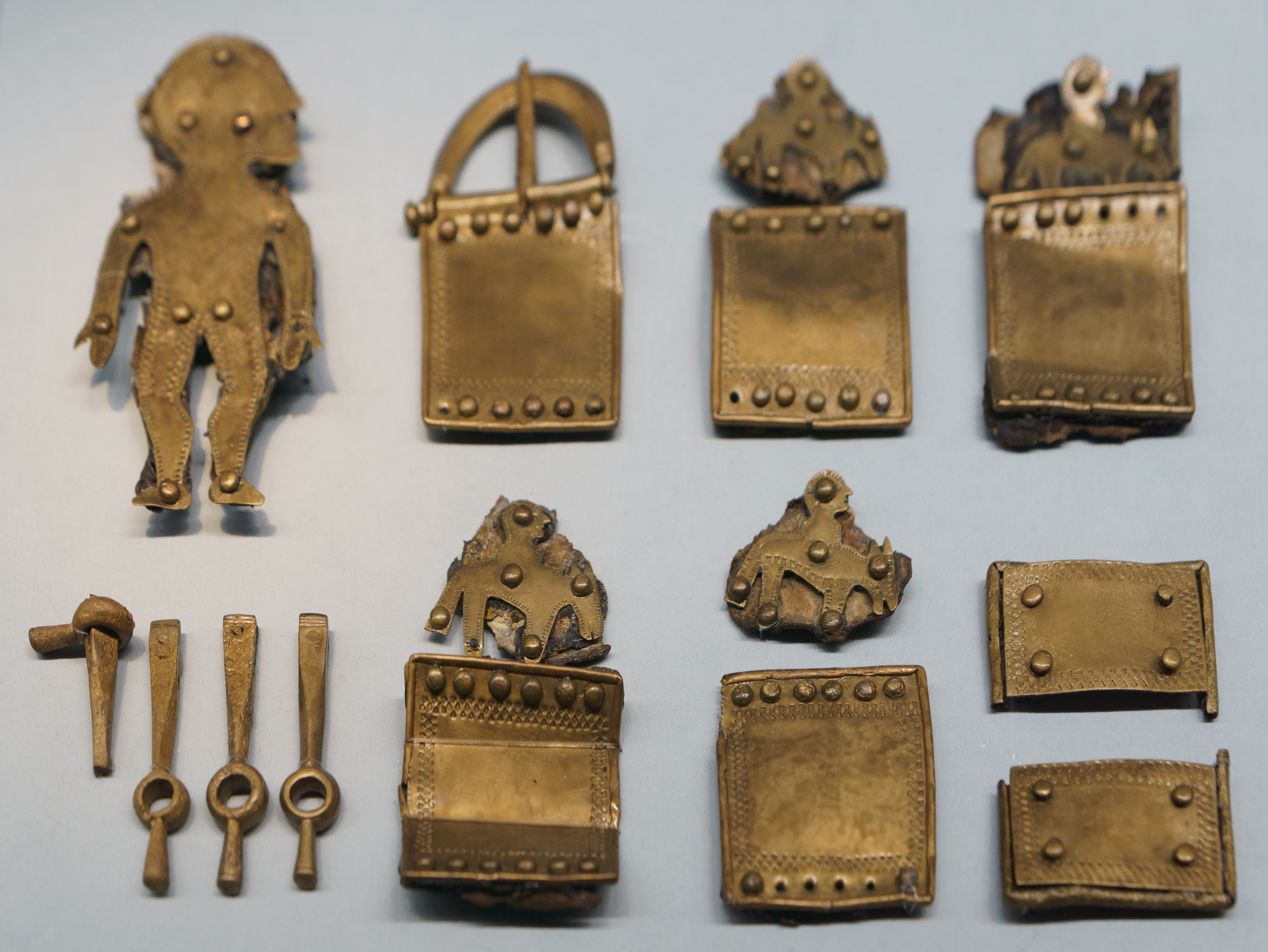
Baldric components

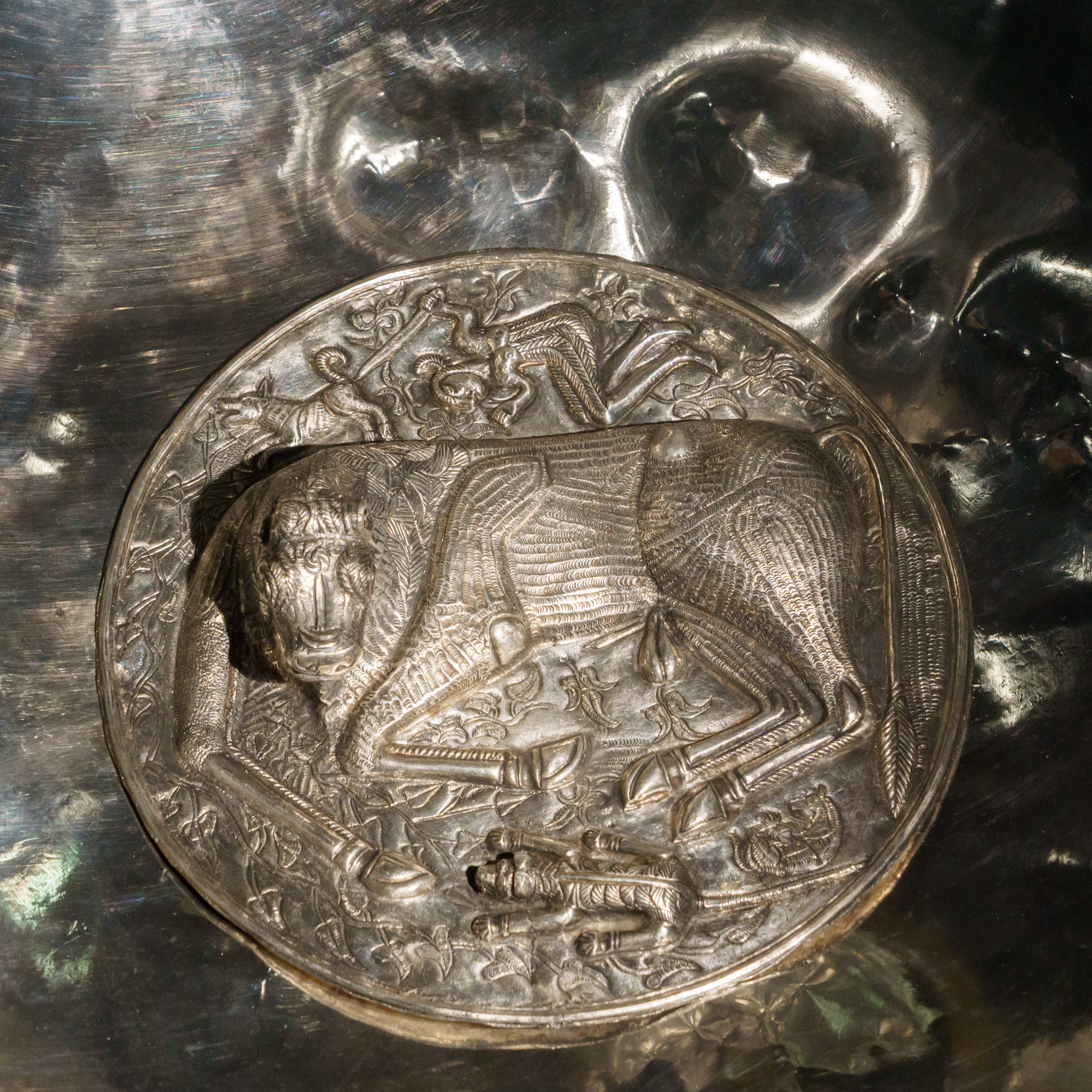
Shield boss detail

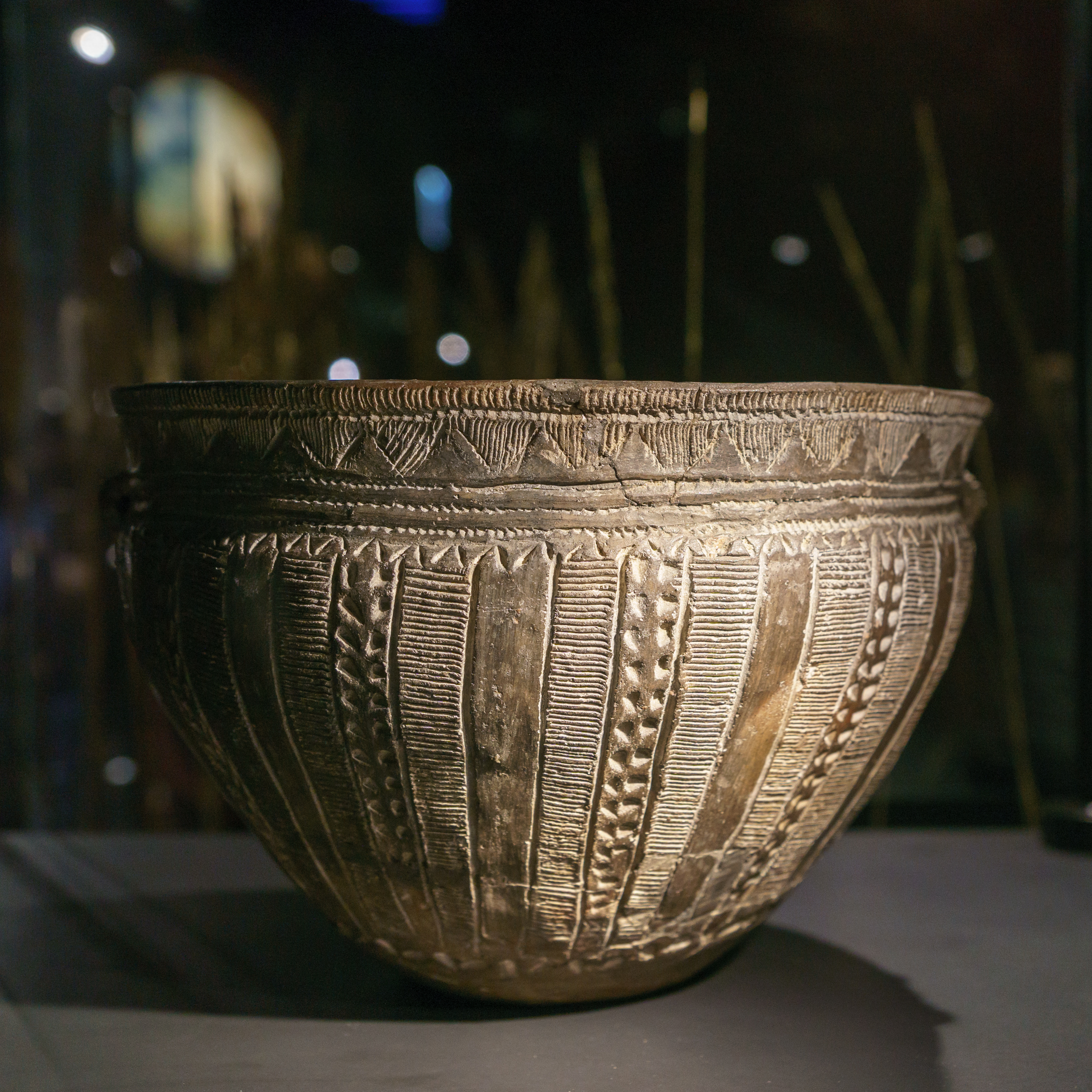
Stone Age clay pot

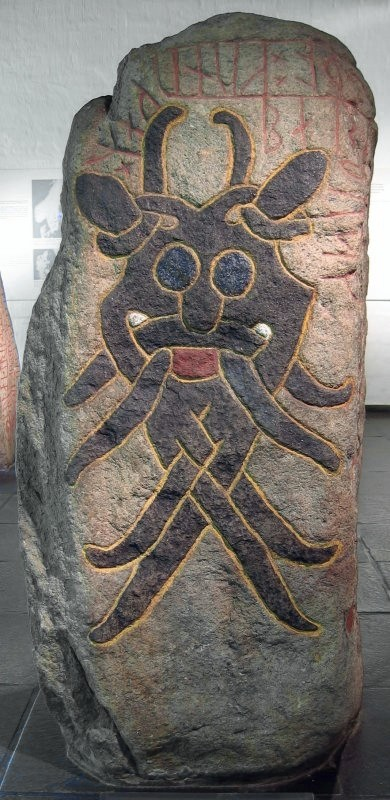
The Mask Stone

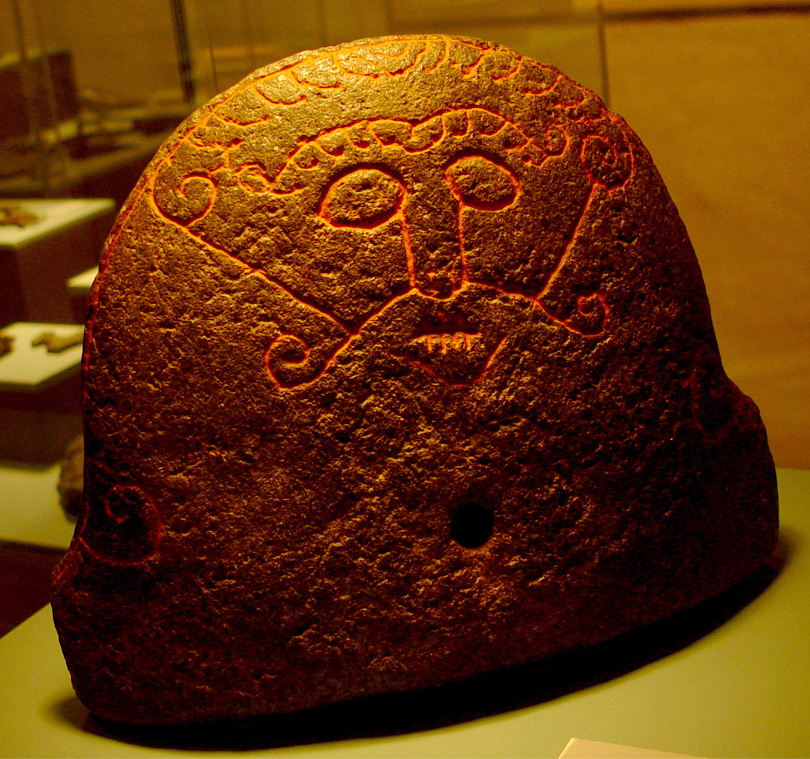
Snaptun Stone, another mask stone depicting Loki

=== Surroundings ===
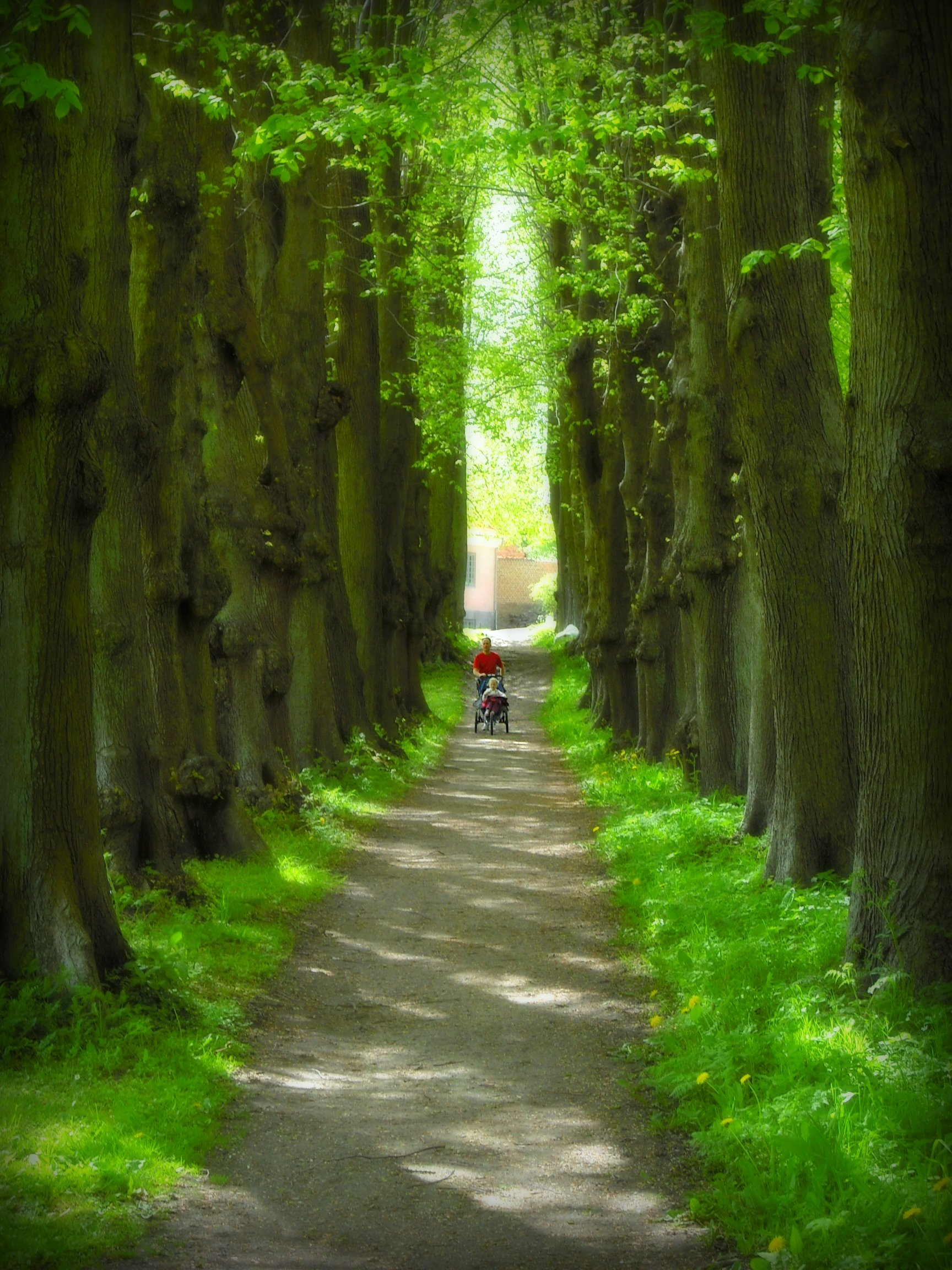
Avenue in the manor park

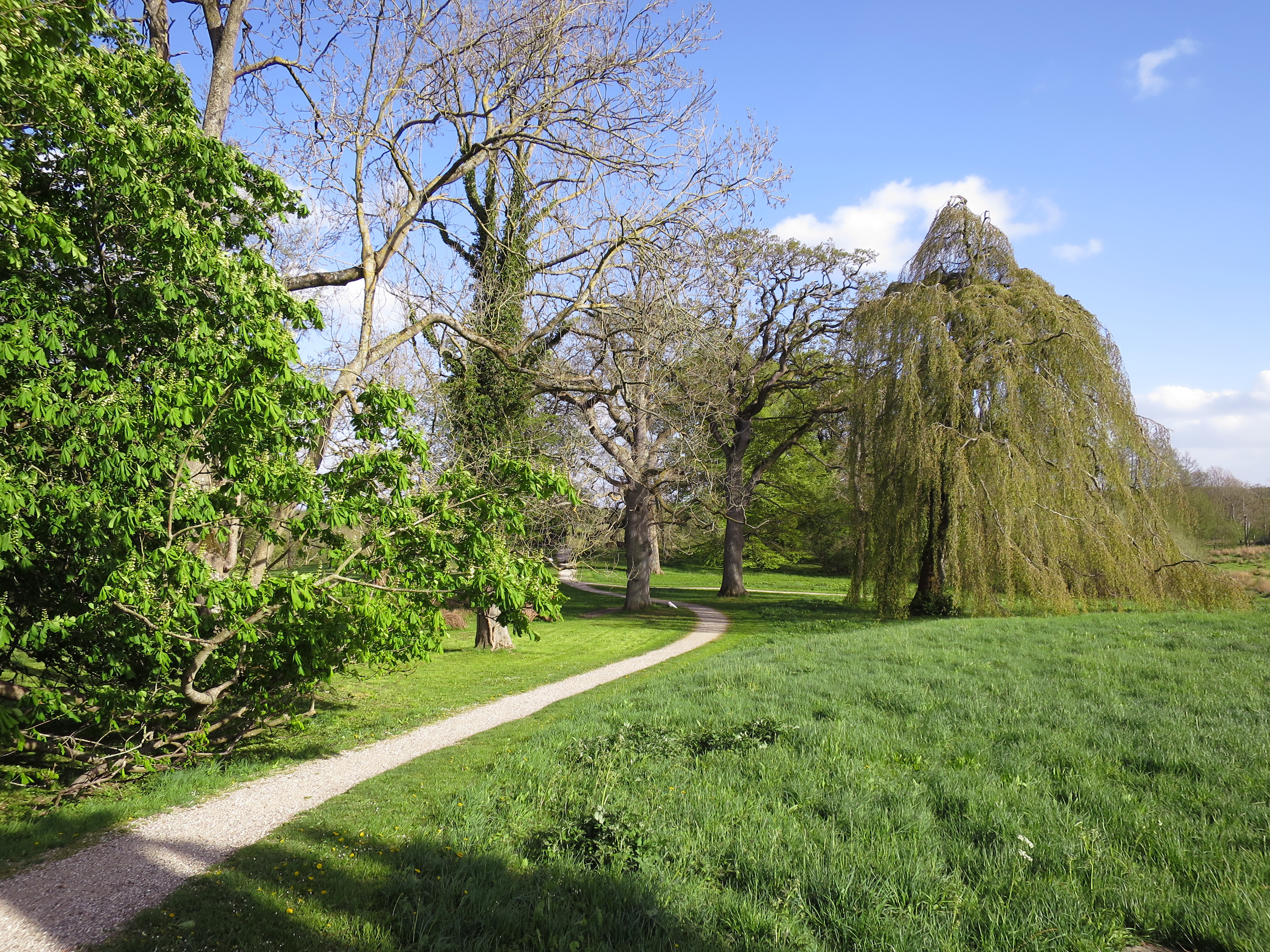
The manor park

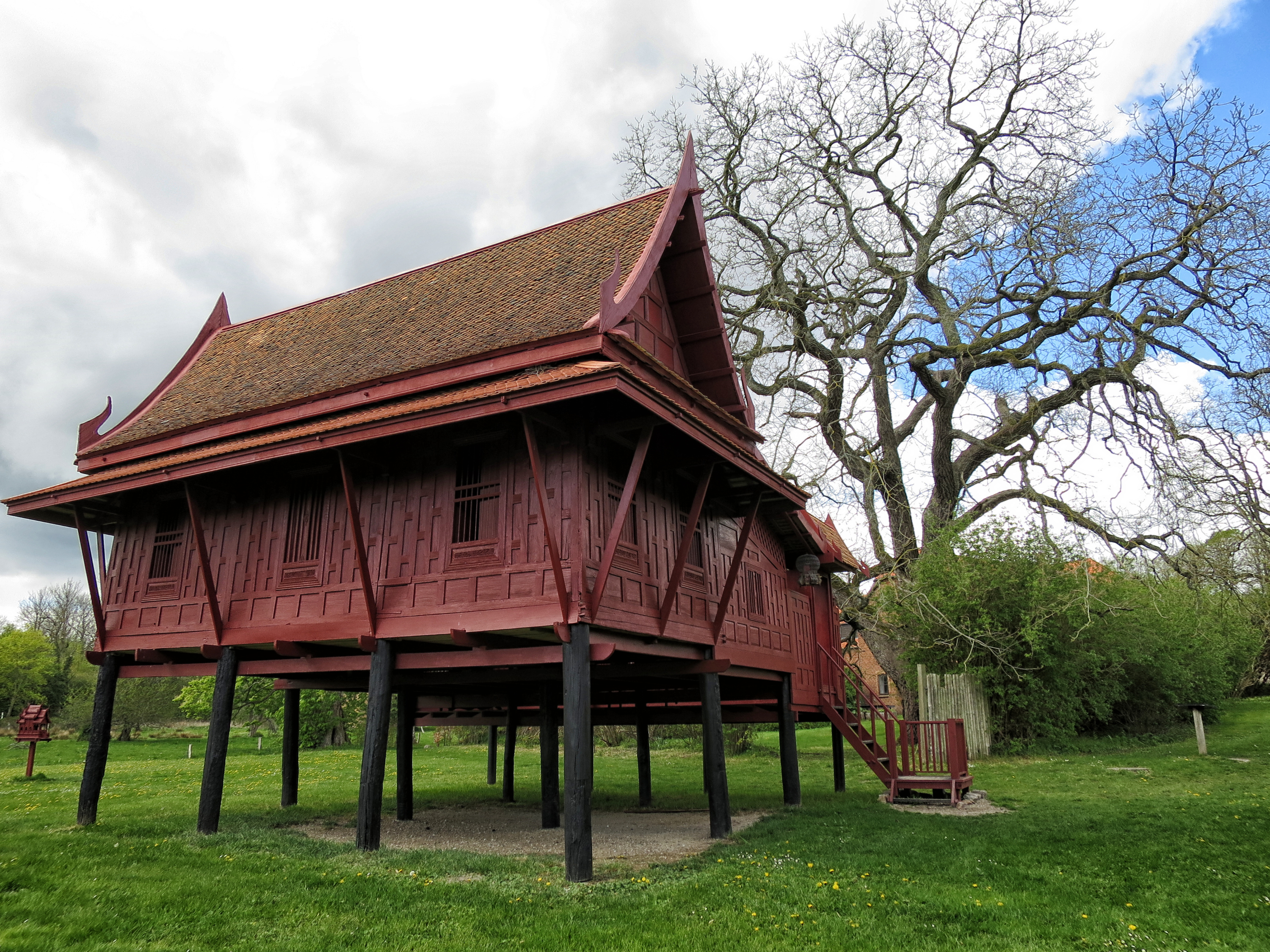
Thai house

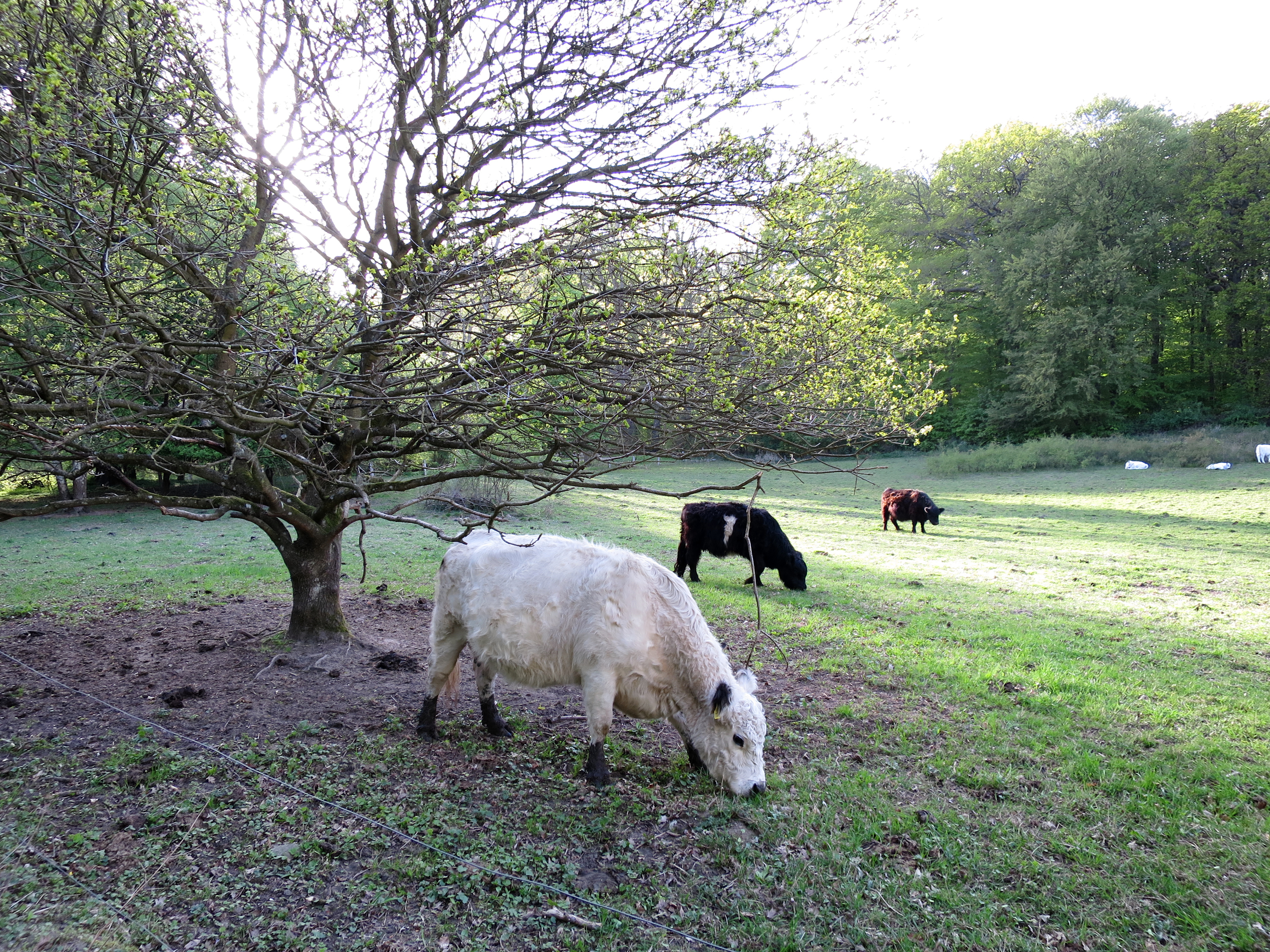
Grazing cattle

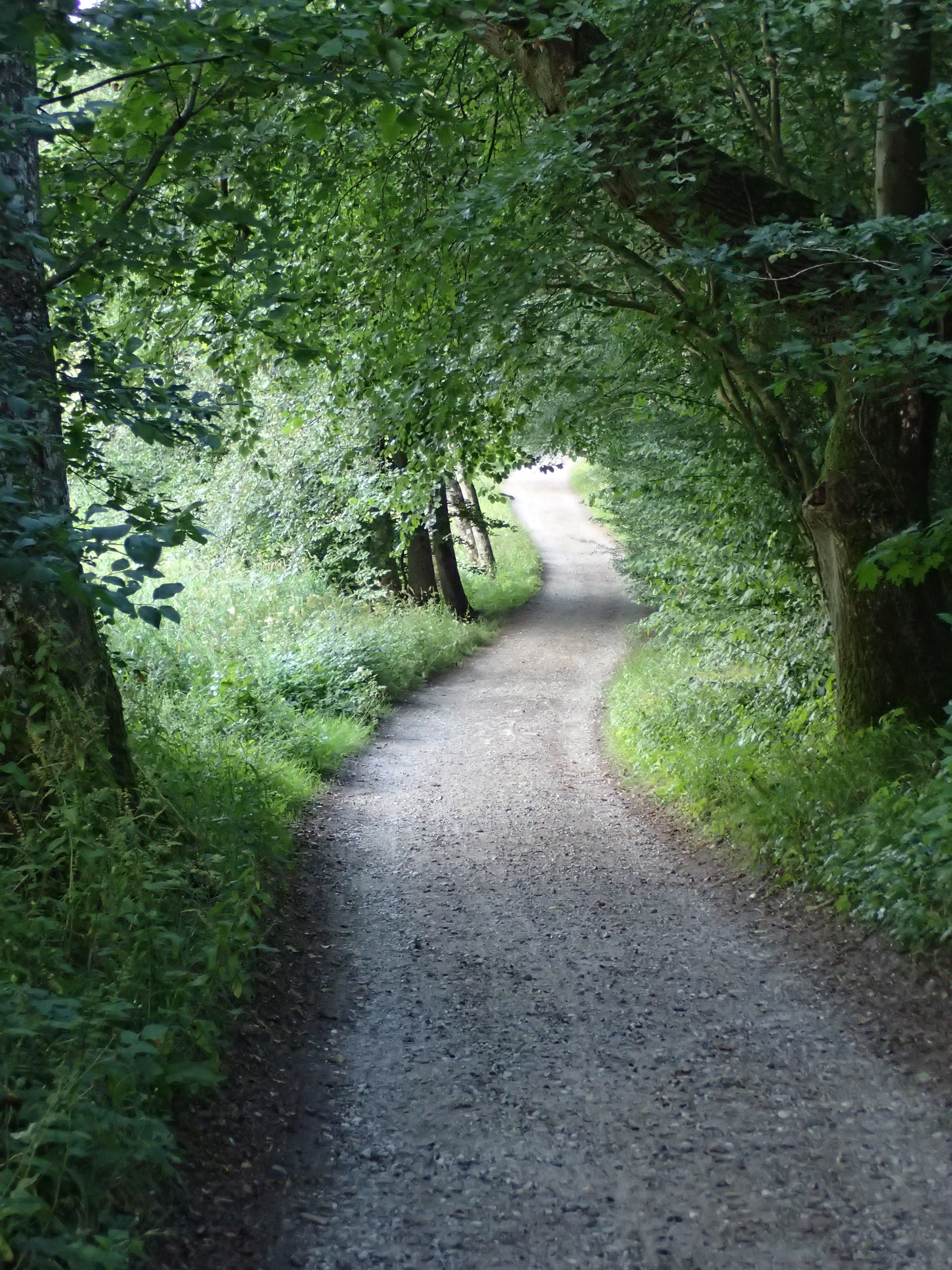
Forest path

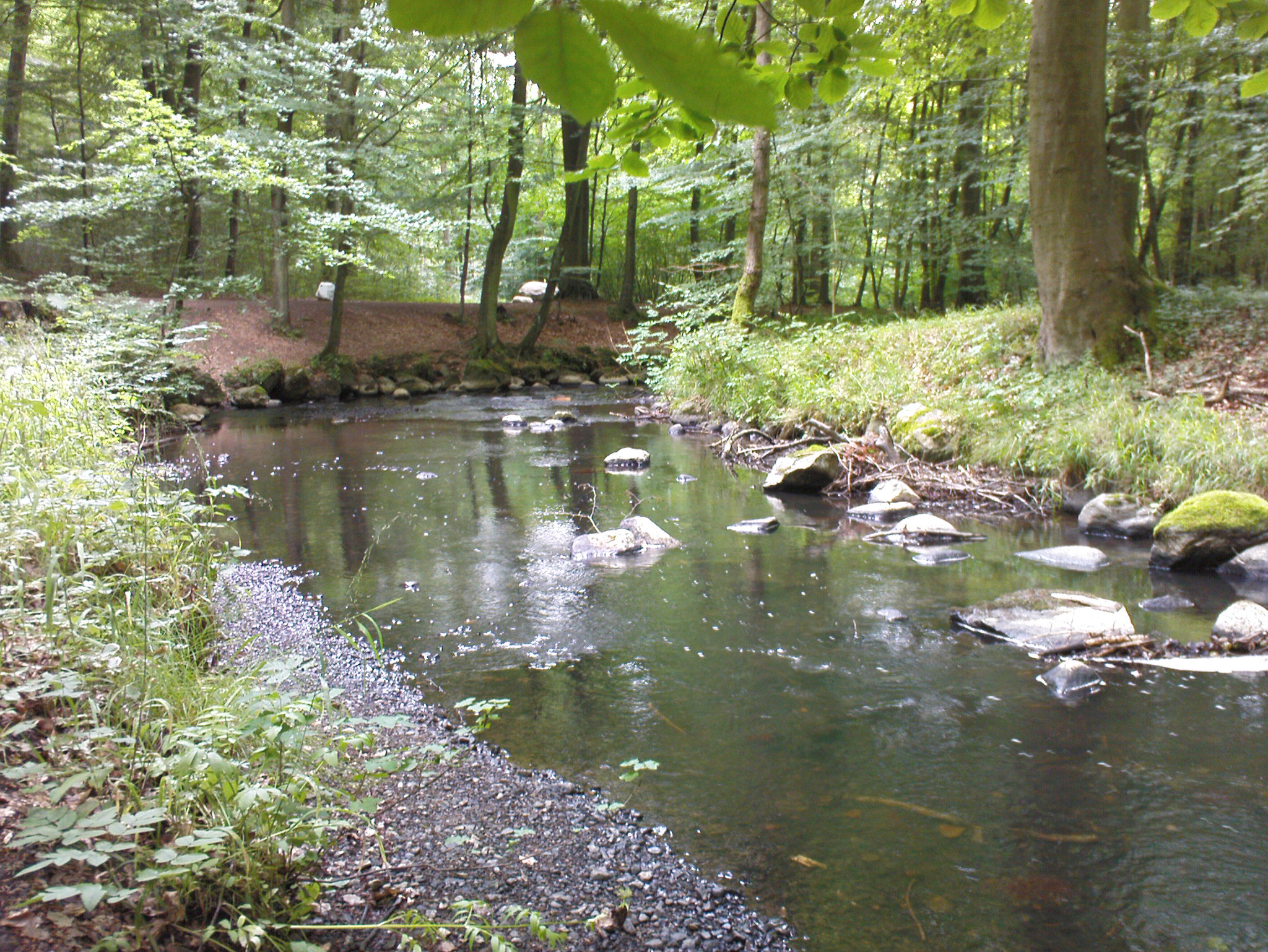
Giber Å stream

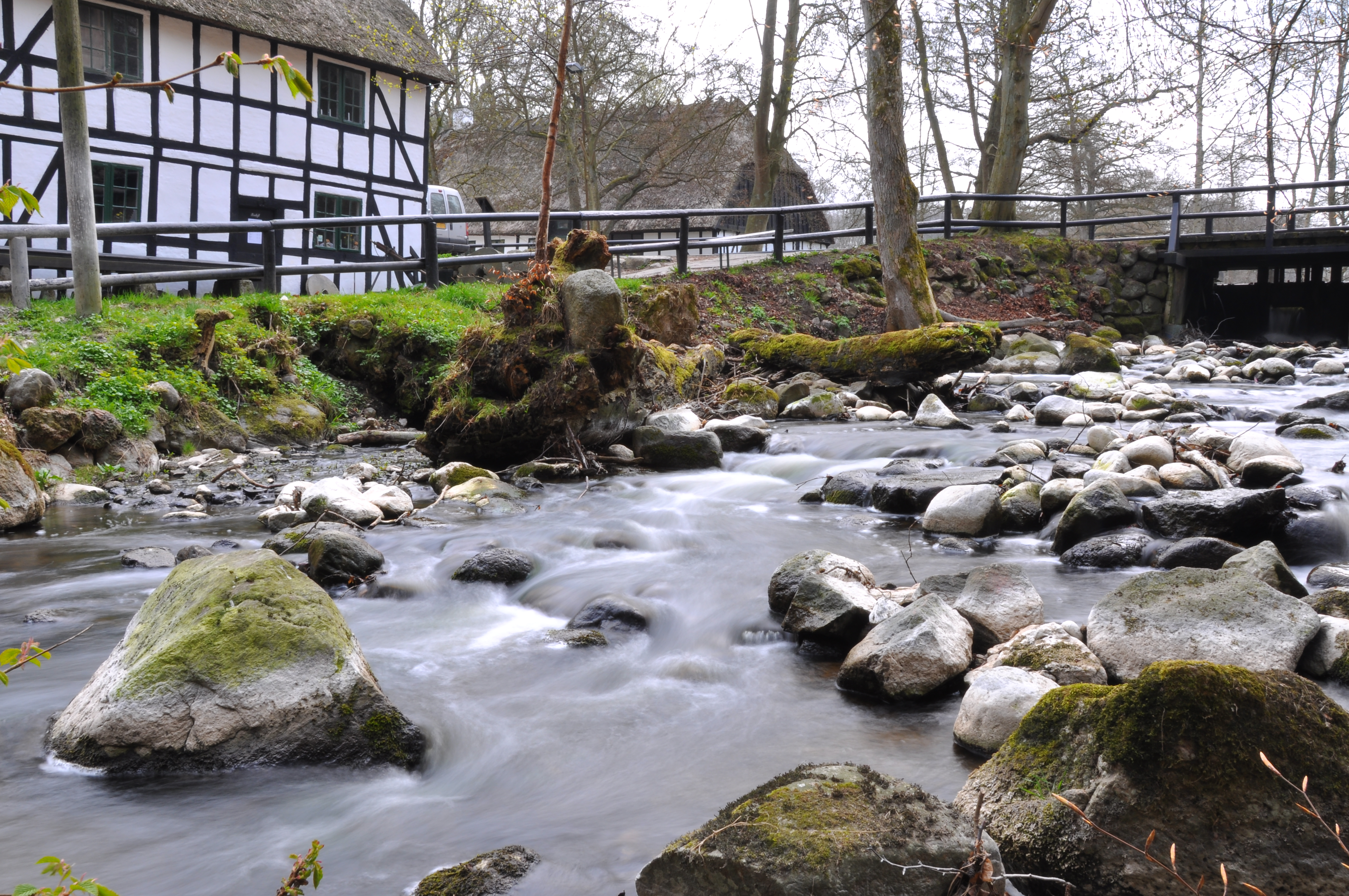
Skovmøllen medieval water mill

== Directors ==
Directors of Moesgaard Museum have included:

- Peder Mortensen (1982–1996)
- Jan Skamby Madsen (1996–2016)
- Mads Kähler Holst (from 2016)

== See also ==
- Endebjerg, a 2018 excavation project by the Museum on the nearby island of Samsø
- Moesgård Viking Moot

== Other sources ==
- Skriver, Jens B. (2001) Moesgård – historien om en herregård (Moesgård Museum) ISBN 978-8-7873-3435-8
