= Moesgård Viking Moot =

Historical reenactment event

Viking Age reenactment
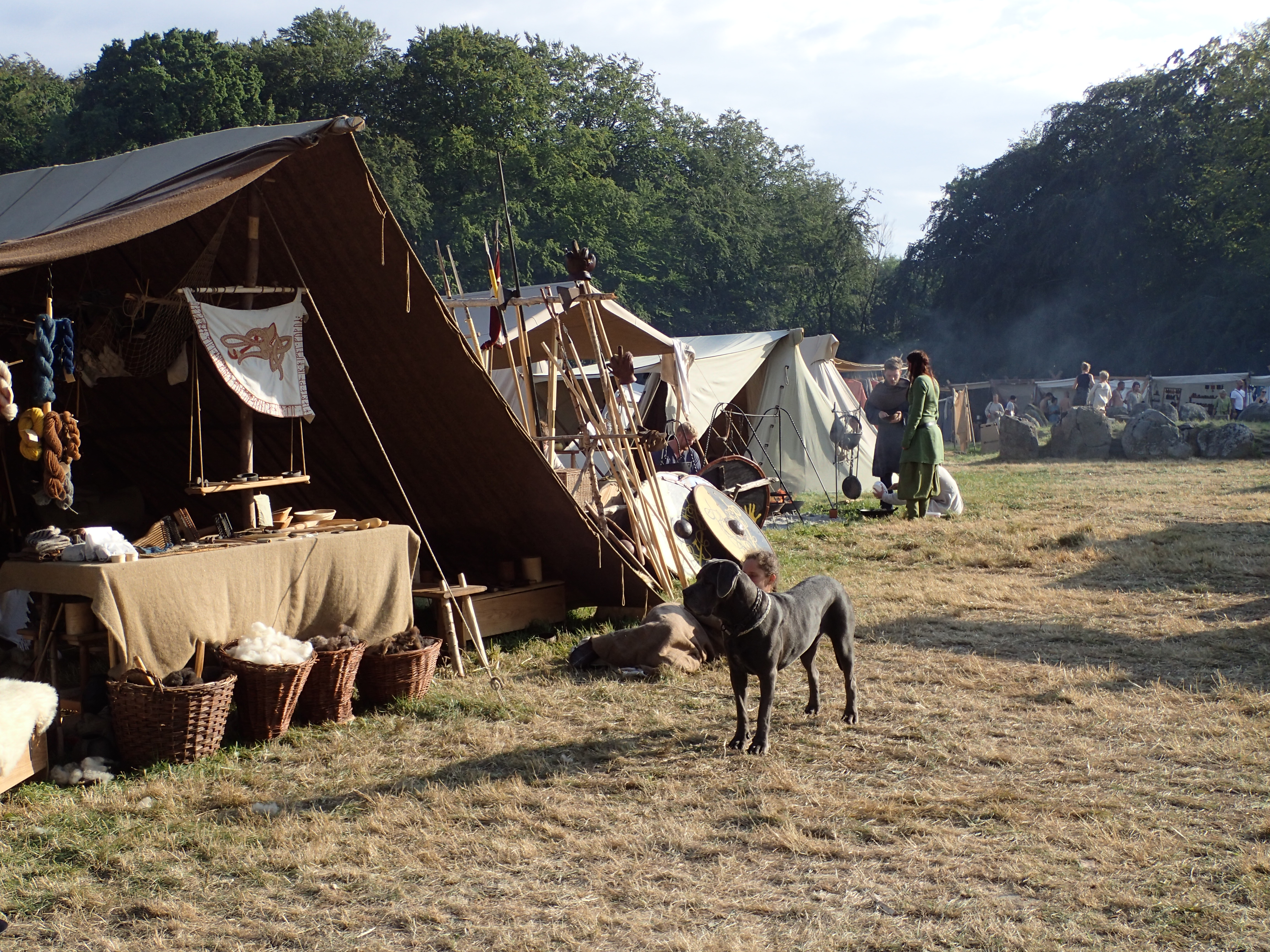
- Status: Active
- Genre: Historical reenactment
- Date: Last week of July
- Frequency: Annually
- Venue: Moesgård Museum
- Location: Aarhus
- Country: Denmark
- Years active: 1977 - present
- Previous event: 2023
- Next event: 2024
- Participants: 1,400 (2015)
- Attendance: 24,400 (2015)
- Area: Moesgård Beach

Moesgård Viking Moot is an annual historical reenactment event in Aarhus, Denmark with a week-long viking market and mock battles. It is the largest Viking Age reenactment event in Denmark and is held on and near the beaches at Moesgård Museum. There are no permanent structures in the area so a temporary tent camp with markets, blacksmiths and kitchens is erected, modelled after the Great Heathen Army. On the last two days of the event, tiding tournaments, single combat contests and mock battles are performed, featuring up to a 1000 participants and an Icelandic horse cavalry.

The event was held for the first time in 1977. The reenactment was founded by Moesgård Museum which had previously held a weekend of lectures and crafts for children. In 1977 it was expanded to a week long event, with a market for jewellery, clothing and weapons. The market has since grown and is now the largest of its kind in Scandinavia.

== 2015 event ==
In 2015 the event attracted 1400 participants from a dozen countries and 23,000 visitors and spectators.

== Literature ==
Konzack, Lars (2017). Viking re-enactment. In: Roued-Cunliffe & Copeland (ed.) Participatory Heritage. London, UK: Facet Publishing, pp. 37-46.
