= Mads Kähler Holst =

Danish archaeologist and museum curator (born 1973)

Mads Kähler Holst FSA (born 30 August 1973) is a Danish archaeologist and museum curator. He is the current director of Moesgaard Museum and a professor at Aarhus University.

== Education and career ==
Holst studied prehistoric archaeology at Aarhus University and obtained his PhD in 2004. His research has focused on Bronze Age and Iron Age wetland sites in Denmark, including excavations of the remains of a battle that occurred at Alken Enge around 1 CE. As director of the Moesgaard Museum, he also heads a project to document submerged Stone Age sites around the coasts of Jutland.

Holst was appointed an assistant professor at Aarhus in 2007 and currently holds the position of professor with special responsibilities. He is a member of the Royal Danish Academy of Sciences and Letters and was elected a Fellow of the Society of Antiquaries of London in 2020.

== Moesgaard Museum ==
Holst has worked at Moesgaard Museum since 2006. He was the head of its Antiquarian Department from 2014 and was appointed its executive director in 2016. Under Holst's direction, the museum's budget initially went from a 10.4 million Danish krone deficit in 2016, to a 1.2 million kr. surplus in 2017, but faced major economic difficulties in 2020 as a result of closures in response to the COVID-19 pandemic.
