= Moesgård =

Historic building in Aarhus Municipality, Denmark

Coordinates: 56.0868°N 10.2258°E

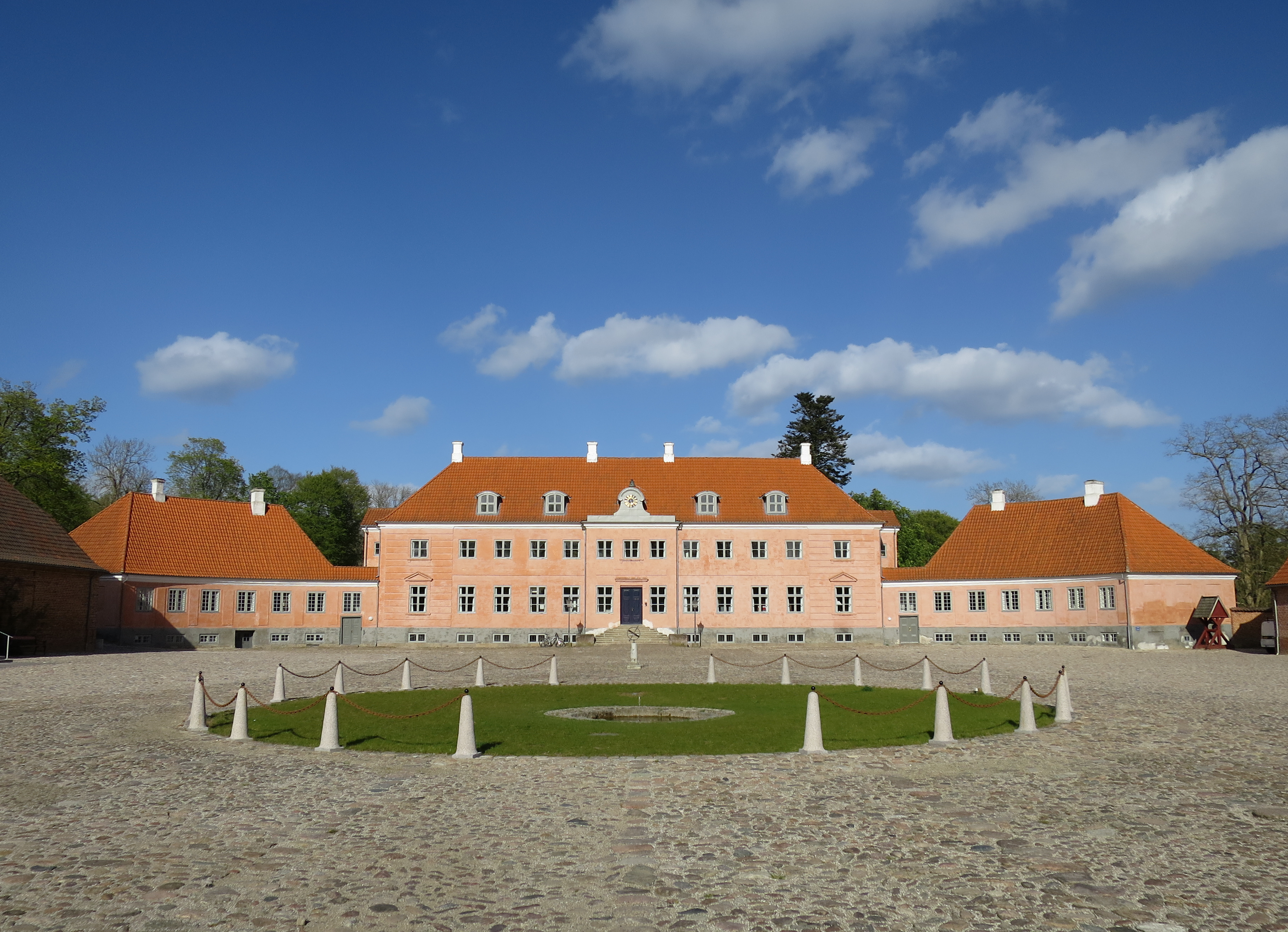
- Manor building and courtyard
- Interactive map of the Moesgård area

General information
- Architectural style: Neoclassical
- Location: Aarhus Municipality, Denmark
- Completed: 1778

Moesgård is a former manor house and a listed building in Aarhus Municipality. The current buildings were completed in 1778 and was listed in the Danish registry of protected buildings and places by the Danish Heritage Agency on 17 July 1918.

The manor and estate is situated in the district of Højbjerg, 10 kilometers south of the city centre of Aarhus. Administratively it belongs to the Mårslet Parish and is today owned by Moesgård Museum. The museum cooperates with the School of Culture and Society from Aarhus University on the subjects of history, archaeology, anthropology and oriental studies with most teaching and lectures being held in the manor buildings. In 2013 the university took over the buildings when a new museum building was completed and most activities related to the museum moved there.

== History ==
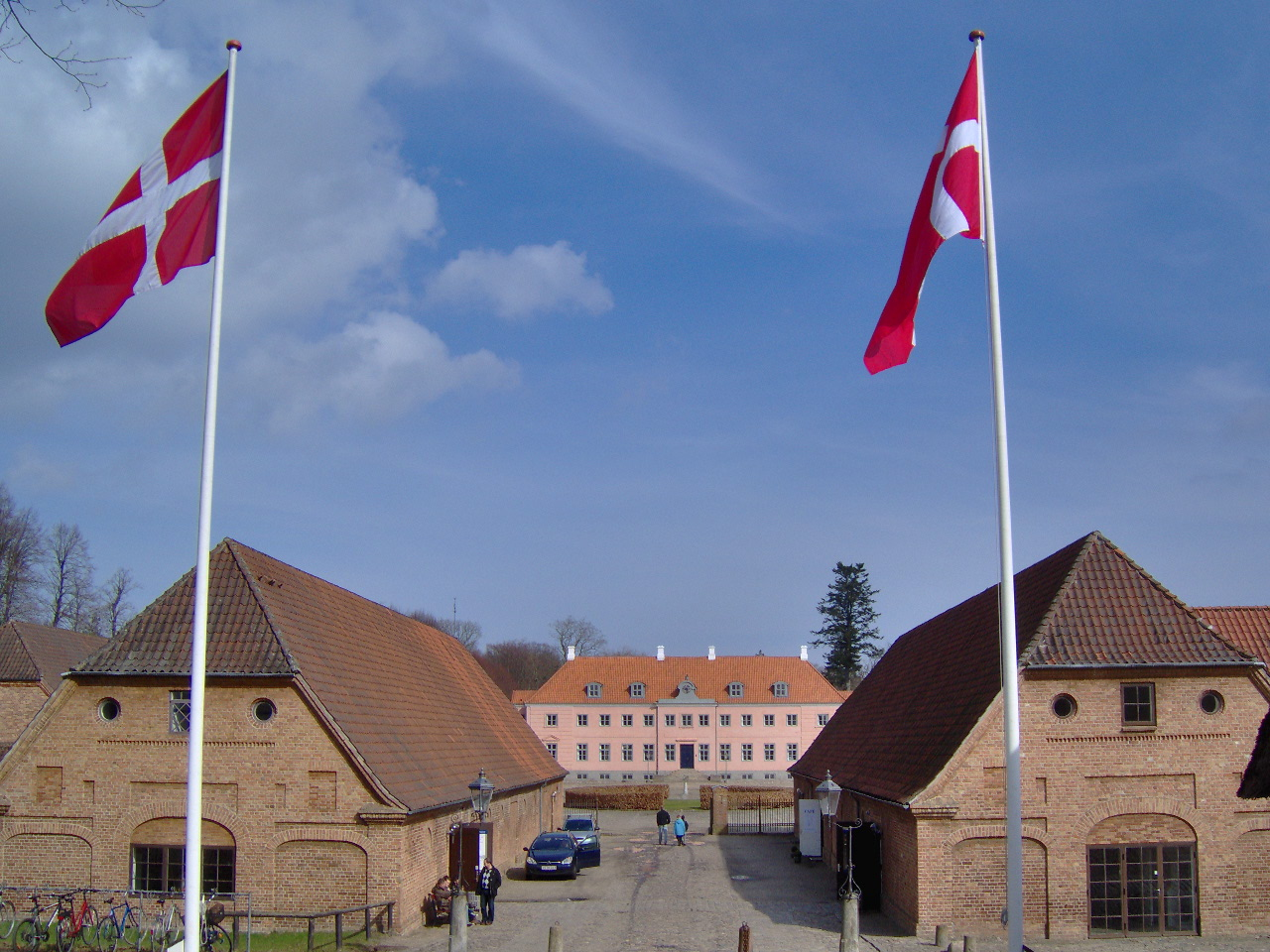
Approach road

The original Moesgård and its owners can be traced back to the late 14th century but the area was likely farmed much earlier. The site of the current manor is believed to be different from the original farm which was likely moved and rebuilt after it burned down during wars with Sweden in the mid-17th century. In the mid 19th century traces of a courtyard was found about a kilometer south-west from the current manor and it is believed this is the location of the original farm. The name "Moesgård" can be literally translated to "bog farm" which hints at a bog in the area which is consistent with archaeological evidence showing signs of wetlands in that area.

In 1660 Mogens Friis owned Moesgård along with the manors Østergaard and Skrumstrup in his large land holdings south of Aarhus. In 1662 he was granted new lands north of the city as compensation for losses incurred during the Dano-Swedish War of 1658–1660 and he established the county of Frijsenborg. Mogens Friis sold his manors south of the city to Gabriel Marselis who had been granted land holdings in the area by the crown in payment for war debts.

Gabriel Marselis rebuilt the newly burnt Moesgård where it stands today. Upon his death in 1673 his land holdings were split between his four sons and his son Vilhelm Marselis inherited the manors Skrumstrup and Moesgaard. Vilhelm Marselis had a new barony established at Skrumstrup Manor which was renamed Vilhelmsborg while he assumed the new family-name Gyldenkrone (English: "Golden Crown"). Moesgård became an allodial title to the new barony but remained in the Marselis family until the early 19th century.

The current main building was constructed in 1780–84 by Christian Frederik Gyldenkrone but the manor was suffering economically and his son Frederik Christian Gyldenkrone became the last owner as the state assumed ownership of the manor in 1822. In 1838 Torkild Dahl bought the manor and it remained in the Dahl family until the mid-20th century. Thorkild Dahl was politically active as a member of the Folketing and was interested in history and classical studies. He compiled a large library of books and worked to establish a museum of history in Aarhus.

In 1960 Århus County bought the manor from the estate of Torkild Dahl's daughter with the intention to redevelop the lands for public use. The lands were turned into recreational areas of forests and beaches while some of the agricultural buildings were turned into a museum from designs by C.F. Møller. In 2013 the anthropological and archaeological department of Aarhus University took over the buildings as a new museum building north-west of the manor was completed in 2014.

== Architecture ==
The manor is designed around a large courtyard, the historicist main building facing west with two curved wings extending to the sides to form the east boundary of the courtyard. On each side of the court yard stands the agricultural buildings from the 1800s symmetrically enclosing the court yard. East of the main building lies a large garden laid out in romantic style with watercourses, bridges and stone levees. Moesgård is accessed by a long road lined with poplars which was established in the 1800s when the road from Aarhus to Odder was created.

== Owners ==
- 1396–1410 – Erik Nielsen Gyldenstierne
- 1410–1425 – Niels Eriksen Gyldenstierne
- 1425–1455 – Erik Nielsen Gyldenstierne
- 1455–1463 – Erik Nielsen Gyldenstierne's estate
- 1463–1473 – Peder Eriksen Gyldenstierne
- 1473–1504 – Oluf Pedersen Gyldenstierne
- 1504–1550 – Oluf Pedersen Gyldenstierne's estate
- 1550–1560 – Lene Olufsdatter Gyldenstierne
- 1560–1563 – Jost Andersen Ulfeldt
- 1563–1565 – Anne Nielsdatter Kaas
- 1565–1591 – Anne Nielsdatter Kaas's estate
- 1591–1623 – Edel Jostsdatter Ulfeldt / Helvig Jostsdatter Ulfeldt / Kirsten Jostsdatter Ulfeldt
- 1623–1638 – Helvig Jostsdatter Ulfeldt
- 1638–1648 – Johan Kjeldsen Brockenhuus
- 1648–1651 – Niels Friis
- 1651–1662 – Mogens Nielsen Friis
- 1662–1673 – Gabriel Marselis
- 1673–1683 – Vilhelm baron Güldencrone no. 1
- 1683–1692 – Regitze Sophie Vind
- 1692–1701 – Christian baron Güldencrone / Jørgen baron Güldencrone / Vilhelm baron Güldencrone no. 2
- 1701–1746 – Christian baron Güldencrone
- 1746–1747 – Vilhelm baron Güldencrone no. 3
- 1747–1753 – Matthias baron Güldencrone
- 1753–1788 – Christian Frederik baron Güldencrone
- 1788–1822 – Frederik Julius Christian baron Gyldenkrone
- 1822–1838 – Danish state
- 1838–1844 – Torkild Christian Dahl / Peder Jacob Møller
- 1844–1872 – Torkild Christian Dahl
- 1872–1911 – Emilie Andersen Dahl
- 1911–1952 – Bothilde Torkilsdatter Dahl
- 1952–1960 – Bothilde Torkilsdatter Dahl's estate
- 1960–1964 – Århus County
- 1964–present – Forhistorisk Museum, now known as Moesgård Museum

== Gallery ==
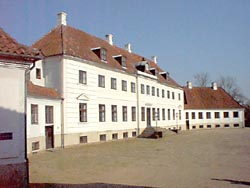
Main building

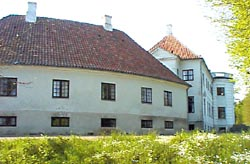
Left wing of the main building

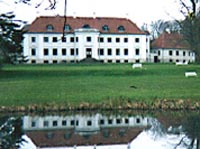
View from the garden

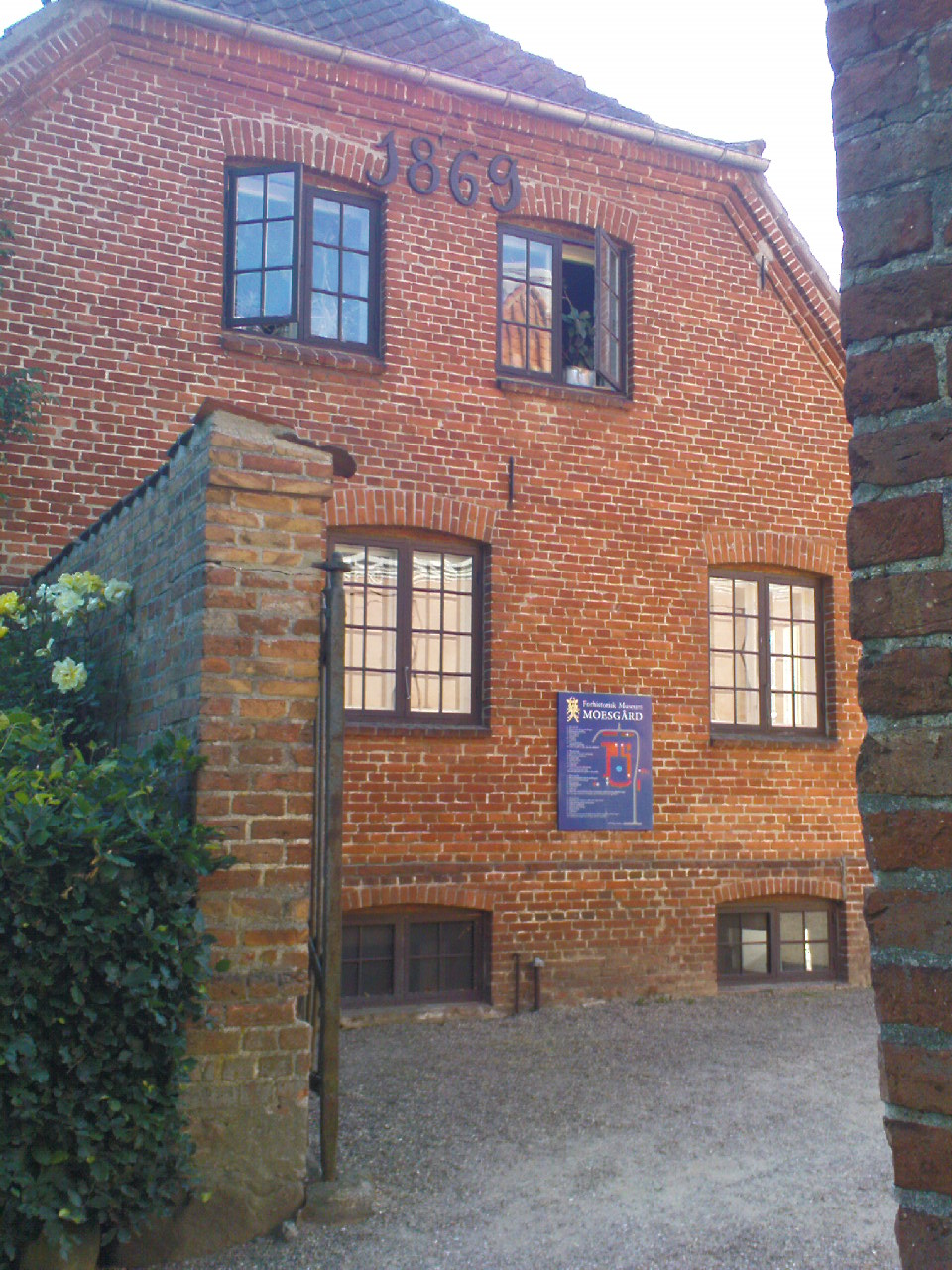
Brick building of the left wing

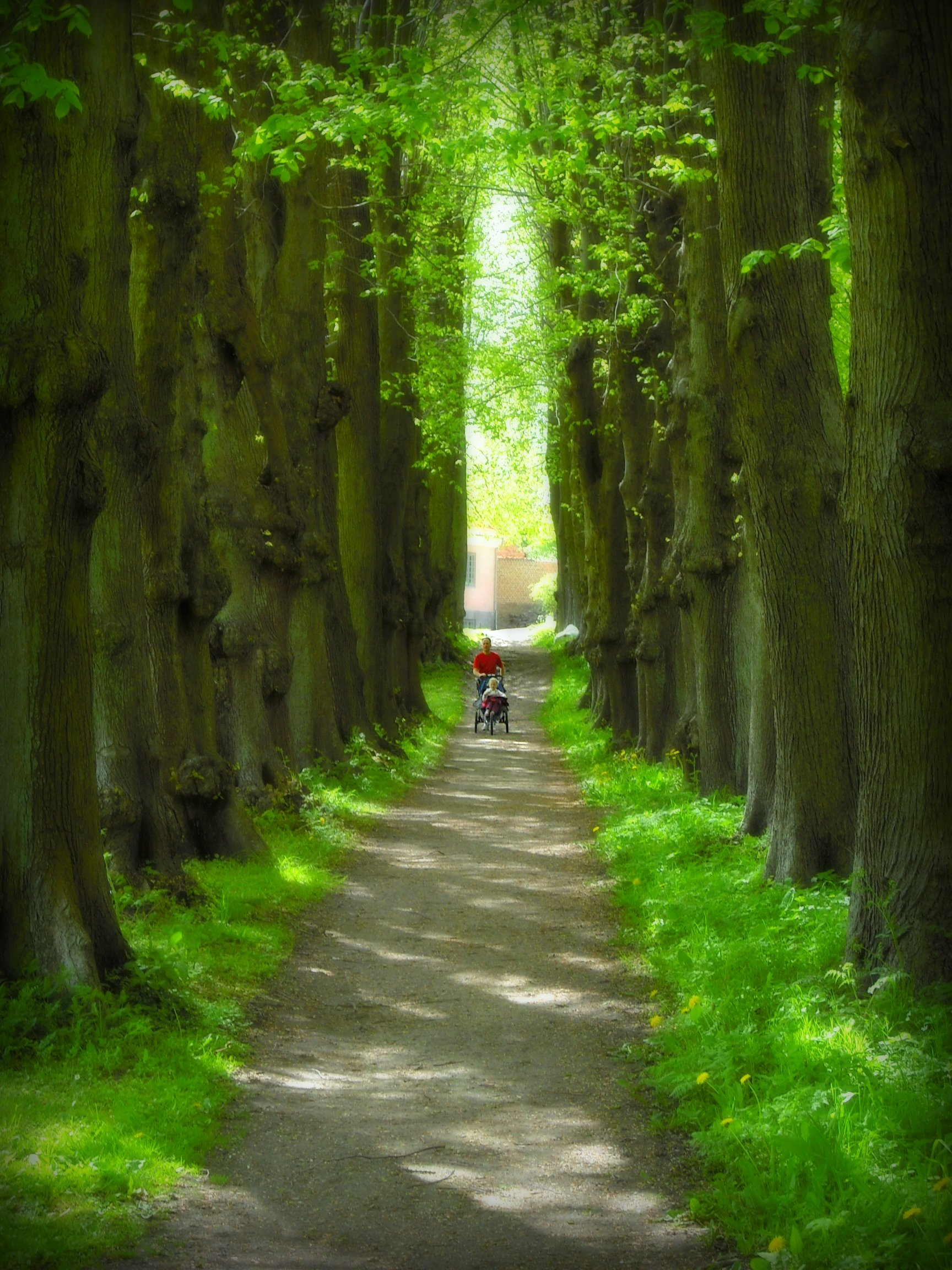
The poplar avenue in the Manor garden
