= Vilhelmsborg =

Coordinates: 56.0668°N 10.1877°E

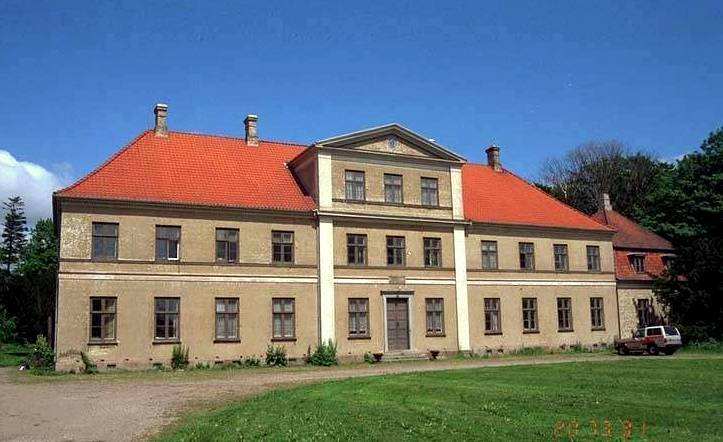
- Interactive map of the Vilhelmsborg area

General information
- Architectural style: Neoclassical
- Location: Aarhus Municipality, Denmark
- Completed: 1842

Technical details
- Floor count: 3

Vilhelmsborg is the National Equestrian Centre of Denmark and a listed building in Aarhus Municipality. The main manor building was completed in 1842 and was listed by the Danish Heritage Agency on 3 March 1945. The manor lies 10 km. south of Aarhus, by Beder-Malling in Mårslet Parish, and is today owned by Aarhus Municipality along with 288 hectares of adjoining land.

In the 19th century H. C. Andersen lived on the Vilhelmsborg estate on several occasions and some of his fairy tales are said to have been inspired by the view of Mols from his window. Johan Skjoldborg also frequented the estate and his novel Gyldholm depicts the hardships of farm hands by the end of the 19th century.

== History ==
The Vilhelmsborg estate lies on the site of the former farm Skumstrupgård and the small village of Skumstrup. The farm was elevated to the status of manor at the end of the 15th century and over time it gradually absorbed the lands and farms surrounding it until the village of Skumstrup ceased to exist. In 1660 Gabriel Marselis was given the farms Moesgård, Havreballegård, Stadsgård and Skumstrupgård as payment for debts incurred by the crown during the Second Northern War. In 1673 Marselis' son, Vilhelm Güldencrone, inherited Skumstrupgård and had it elevated to a barony. The name Vilhelmsborg means "Vilhelm's Castle" in reference to Vilhelm Güldencrone and the manor stayed in the Güldencrone family for generations, into the 20th century. In 1919 political reforms altered many of the inherited titles and their privileged positions resulting in the Güldencrone family leaving the estate and selling it in 1923.

In 1973 the estate was bought by Aarhus Municipality. The city council elected to turn the estate into the National Equestrian Centre. Several riding halls were erected and much of the arable land was sold off while the forest and park was opened for public use.

== Architecture ==
The main building was built in the 1840s as a two-storey neoclassical building on a tall granite foundation. The adjoining barns, tenant housing and other farm buildings formed a square to create a courtyard, as was typical for farms at the time. In 1855 the adjoining buildings burned down leaving only the main building and it was decided to rebuild with structures separately. The estate contains the remains of a former renaissance castle. Today only the foundation of the caste remains but from descriptions from the 1670s it is known roughly what it looked like. It was a single building in two stories with oriel and a tower in the middle, facing a courtyard ringed by farm buildings.

== National Equestrian Centre ==
The National Equestrian Centre was established in 1989 in renovated buildings and newly built riding halls, exhibition halls, outdoor tracks and a restaurant. The centre is managed non-profit by Aarhus Municipality, Aarhus Riding Club and Dansk Varmblod and Prince Henrik is the official protector. The centre offers large venues for international competitions, hippology studies and conferences.

== Owners ==
| From | To | Owner |
| | | Peder Ebbesen Galt |
| | 1548 | Jost Andersen Ulfeldt |
| 1548 | | Anne Ulfeldt, married Friis |
| | | Jørgen Friis |
| 1625 | 1651 | Niels Friis |
| 1651 | 1662 | Mogens Friis |
| 1662 | 1673 | Gabriel Marselis |
| 1673 | 1683 | Vilhelm Marselis Gyldenkrone |
| 1683 | 1692 | Regitze Sophie Gyldenkrone |
| 1692 | 1746 | Christian Gyldenkrone |
| 1746 | 1747 | Vilhelm Gyldenkrone |
| 1747 | 1753 | Matthias Gyldenkrone |
| 1753 | 1788 | Christian Frederik Gyldenkrone |
| 1788 | 1824 | Frederik Julius Christian Gyldenkrone |
| 1824 | 1863 | Ove Christian Ludvig Gyldenkrone |
| 1863 | 1895 | Carl Vilhelm Gyldenkrone |
| 1895 | 1920 | Ove Theodor Carl Gyldenkrone |
| 1920 | 1923 | Holger Gyldenkrone-Rysensteen |
| 1923 | 1954 | Lars Niels Christian Hviid |
| 1954 | 1973 | Knud Gustav Hviid |
| 1973 | ... | Aarhus Municipality |

== See also ==
- Listed buildings in Aarhus Municipality
