= Lyseng Church =

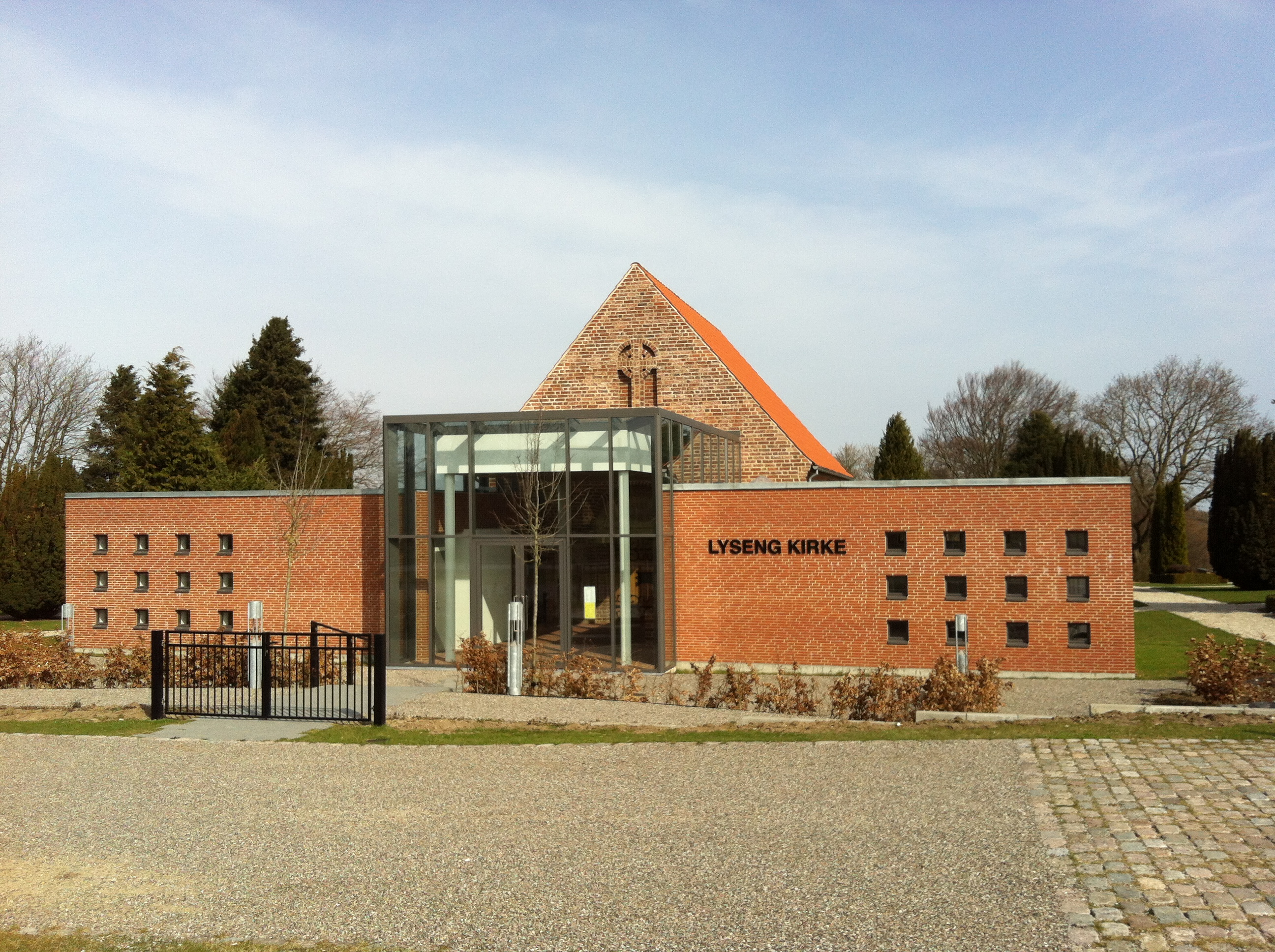
- Lyseng Church front entrance
- Lyseng Church
- 56.1092°N 10.1872°E
- Location: Bushøjvej 188; 8270 Højbjerg
- Country: Denmark
- Denomination: Church of Denmark

History
- Status: Church

Architecture
- Completed: 1913

Specifications
- Materials: Brick

Administration
- Archdiocese: Diocese of Aarhus

Lyseng Church (Danish: Lyseng Kirke) is a church in Aarhus, Denmark. The church is situated in the Højbjerg neighborhood in on Bushøjvej by Ring 2 in the southern suburbs of Aarhus. Lyseng Church is a part of the Church of Denmark, the Danish state church, and is a shared secondary church to Holme Parish and Skåde Parish, officially under Holme pastorate along with Holme Church.

Lyseng Church is an expansion of the former Eastern Chapel (Danish: Østre Kapel) which had sat unused on the site for 40 years. Holme and Skåde Parish are two of the largest parishes in the Diocese of Aarhus, each with some 11.000 parish members, and the diocese planned to split the parishes. The parish councils objected to the plan and instead suggested the creation of a third church in order to lessen the burden on the existing churches. The decision was made in 2007 in a joint agreement between the two parishes and the diocese and the restoration was completed in 2010 with the first sermon being held in February of that year.

The original chapel was constructed in 1913 in Romanesque style, with a base of natural stone and a superstructure of brick. The chapel was built between the villages of Holme and Skåde to serve a joint cemetery. In 1951 the chapel was made redundant when Holme Church got its own cemetery and services at the chapel was reduced until it was eventually closed down entirely.

== See also ==
- List of churches in Aarhus
