= Aarhus Craftmen's Association's Asylum =

Coordinates: 56.1574°N 10.2105°E

Aarhus Craftsmen's Association's Asylum
- Aarhus Håndværkerforenings Asyl
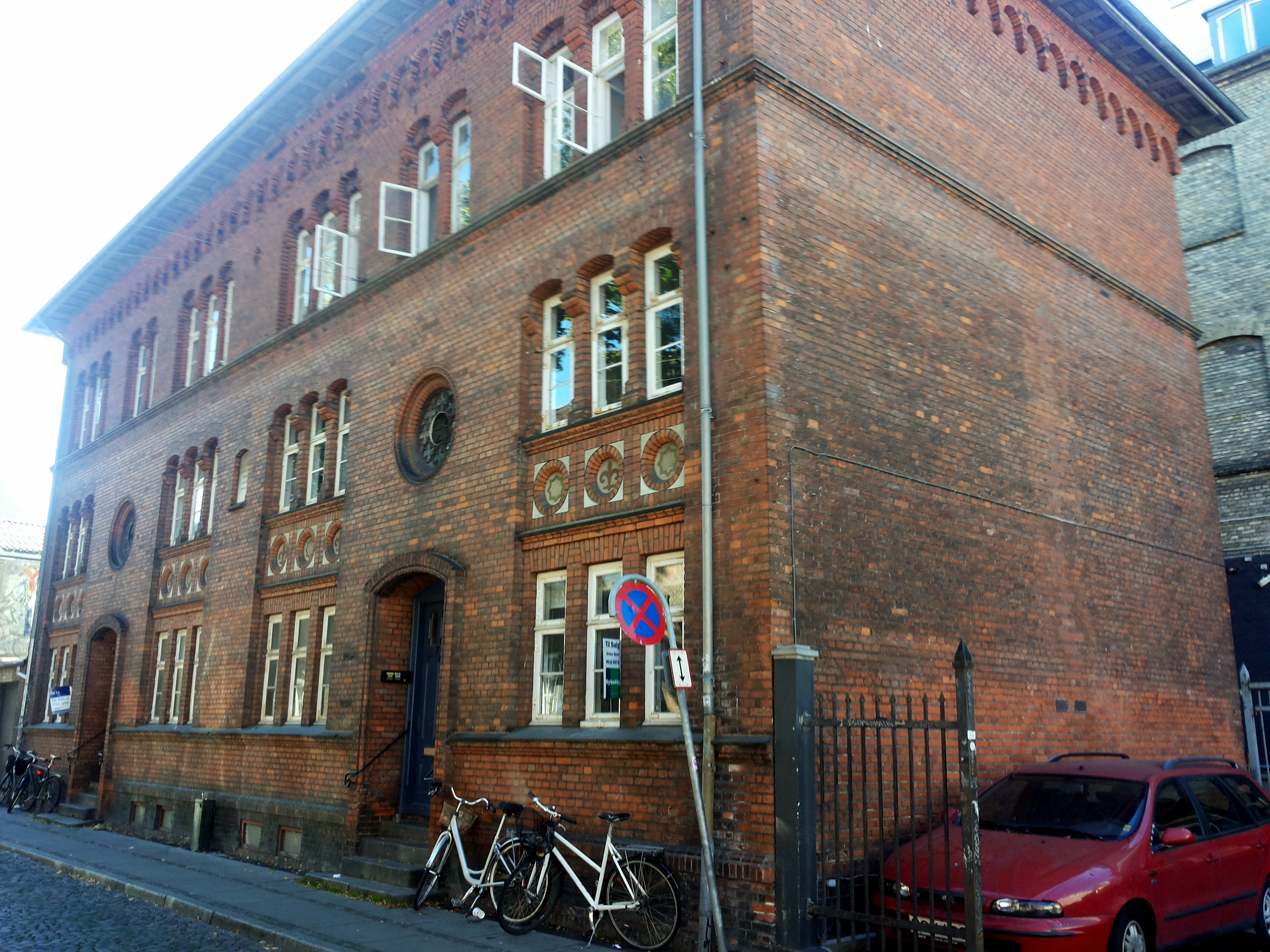
- Front facade of the former asylum
- Interactive map of the Aarhus Craftsmen's Association's Asylum area

General information
- Location: Aarhus, Denmark
- Construction started: 1865
- Completed: 1866

Technical details
- Floor count: 3
- Floor area: 528 m^{2} (5,680 sq ft)

Design and construction
- Architect: Vilhelm Theodor Walther

Aarhus Craftsmen's Association's Asylum (Danish language: Århus Håndværkerforenings Asyl) is a listed building and a former asylum in Aarhus, Denmark. The building was finished in 1866 and was listed in the Danish national registry of protected buildings and places by the Danish Heritage Agency on 27 September 1980. The building is situated on Paradisgade in the central Indre by neighbourhood.

== History ==
The Aarhus Craftsmen's Association was established in 1848 and it still exists today. The purpose of the association was originally to generally safeguard the interests of the craftsmen in the city and license and test new craftsmen. On 2 December 1848 an asylum foundation was established on the association's general meeting. The foundation was tasked with collecting funds for old and weak craftsmen or their widows. In 1867 enough funds had been collected and construction for a new asylum building began. The asylum was placed in Paradisgade next to the association building and was finished in 1868. In 1980 the building was listed.

== Architecture ==
The buildings was designed by Vilhelm Theodor Walther and is reminiscent of some of his other works such as Holme Church and the adjacent Caftsmen Association building. It's a 3-story building constructed of red brick topped with a hip roof of winged brick. Cornices of masonry rings the top of the building. Windows are primarily white painted grid windows but on the front facade two round windows sits above the entrance doors, illuminating the interior staircases. The entrance doorways are arched and the doors made of teak.

== Gallery ==
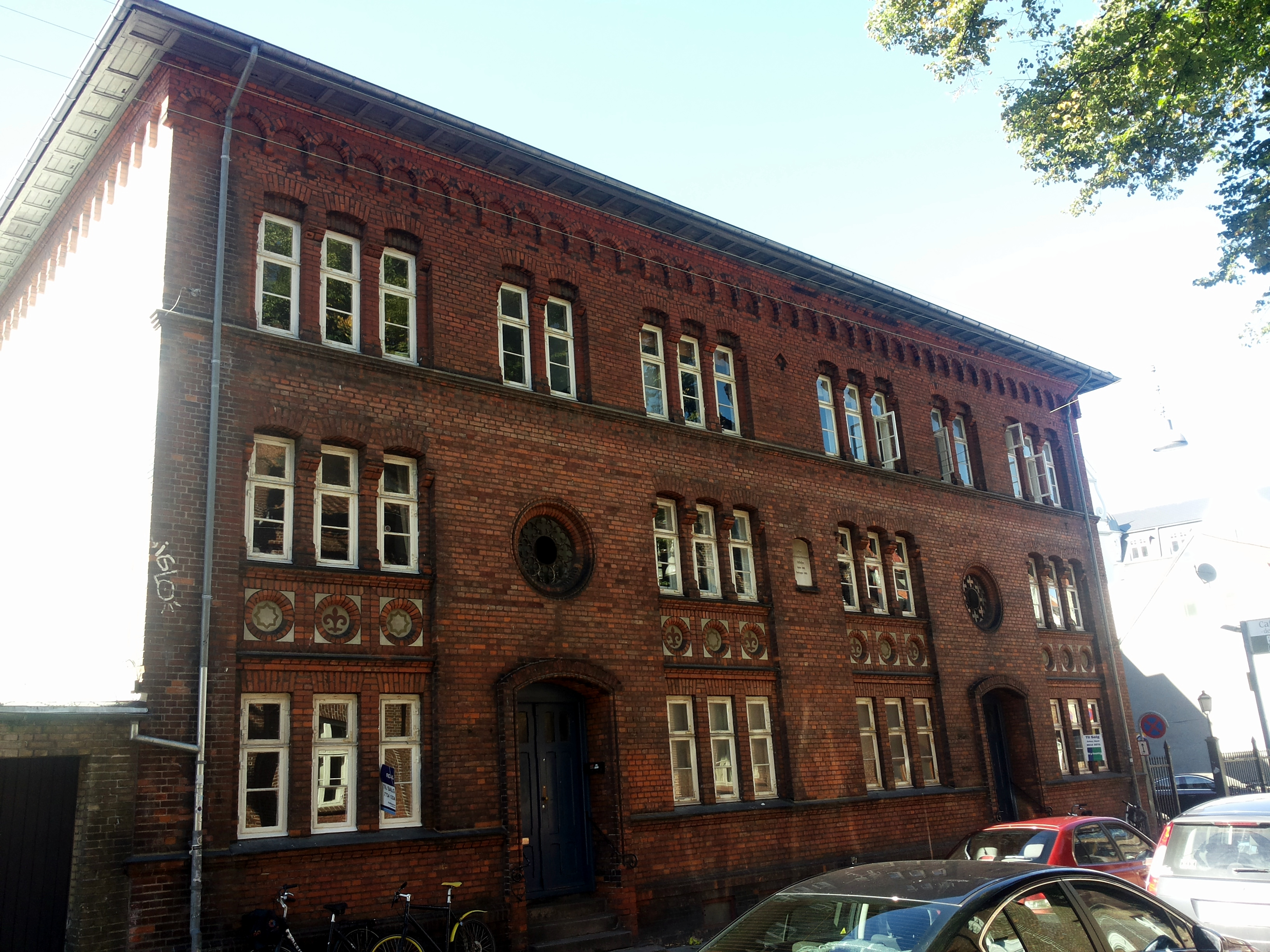

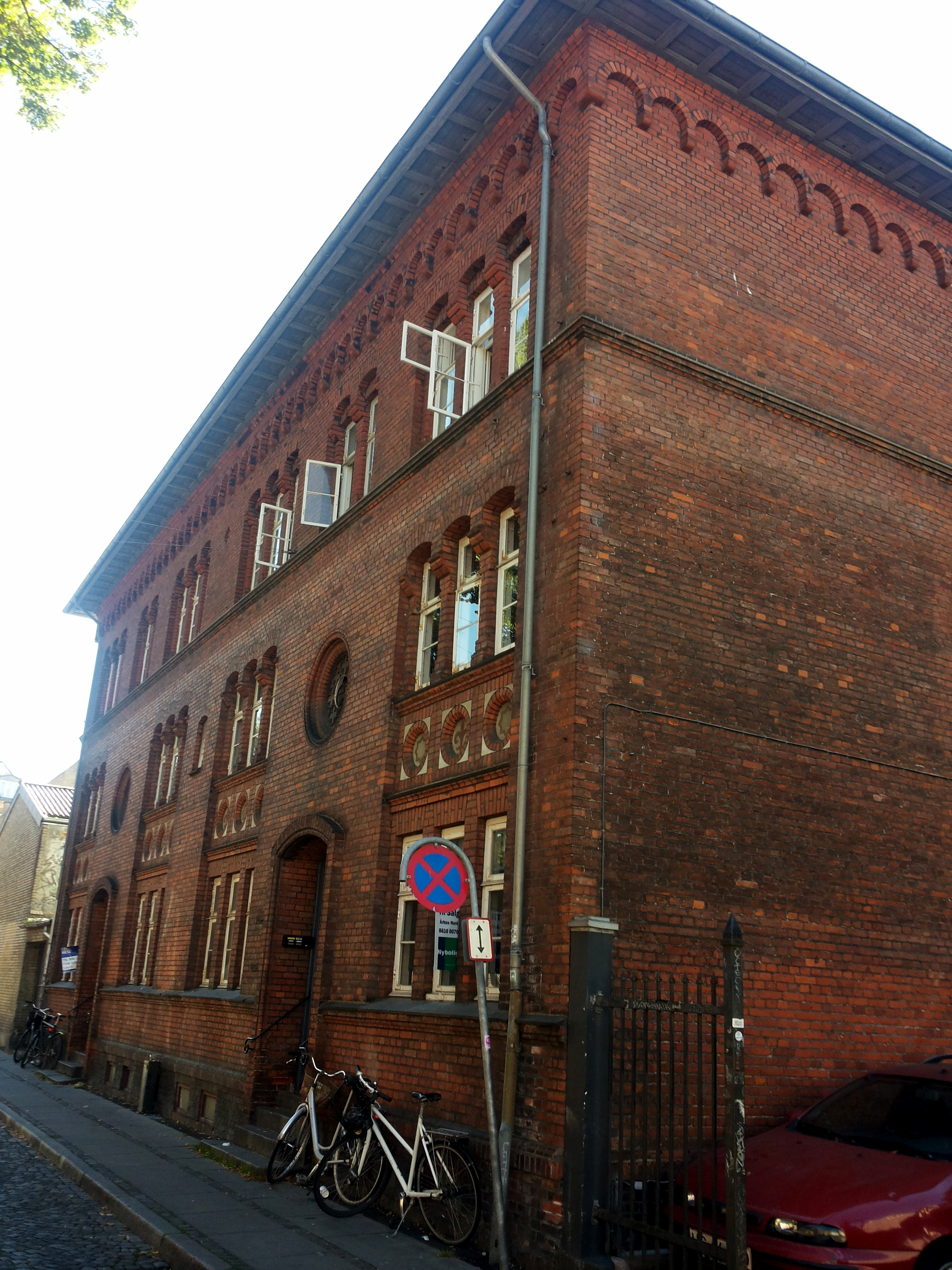

== See also ==
- Listed buildings in Aarhus Municipality
