= Vilhelm Theodor Walther =

Danish architect and Royal Building Inspector for Jutland

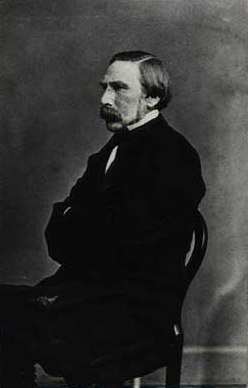
Vilhelm Theodor Walther

Vilhelm Theodor Walther (13 November 1819 – 28 August 1892) was a Danish architect and Royal Building Inspector for Jutland. He was born in Kongens Lyngby, Denmark and died in Aarhus. He was twice awarded the Academy's Neuhausen Prize (Neuhausenske Præmie) for excellence in architecture and in 1885, he received the Cross of Honor of the Order of the Dannebrog. Walther completed a considerable amount of restoration work on the cathedral and St Paul's Church in Aarhus and designed a number of churches in the area. Walther died in Aarhus in 1892 of cholera.

== Biography ==
After his confirmation, he studied at the Royal Academy in Copenhagen from 1843 under Gustav Friedrich Hetsch, winning the Grand Silver Medal in 1845 and, for his parliamentary building and courthouse, the Grand Gold Medal in 1857. He was also awarded the Neuhausen Prize on two occasions (1849 and 1857). In parallel with his studies, Walther supervised the construction of buildings in Norway, Hamburg and Altona, as well as designing various manor houses and the headquarters of the Silkeborg Paper Mill. Following short journeys to Germany and Holland, he made an extended trip to Germany, France and Italy on the Academy's major scholarship (1859–1861). On his return, he was appointed Royal Building Inspector for Jutland (1862), residing in Aarhus. There he accomplished a significant amount of work, restoring the interiors of the Church of Our Lady (1866) and the cathedral (1871). He also designed the Aarhus Art Museum (1877) and a number of private residences.

St Paul's Church in Aarhus (1887) is partly built to his designs. He also designed churches in Aaby, Holme and Skjørring, and restored St Martin's Church, Næstved, 1857–1859, the exterior of St Martin's Church, Randers, Thorsager Church, and the church in Grenaa. Other works included customs houses in Randers, Nykøbing Mors, Thisted, Hals and Als Odde, postal buildings in Brønderslev and Nykøbing, and a grammar school in Aalborg.

== Assessment and awards ==
Walther was not particularly original but he was a competent, tasteful architect whose works displayed respect and seriousness. He was a titular professor in 1868, was awarded the Dannebrog in 1878, the Dannebrog Cross of Honor in 1885, and was elevated to councillor (etatsråd) in 1892.

== Works ==
The buildings Walther designed include:

- Main building of Silkeborg Paper Mill (1844)
- Main building of Marienborg Manor (1853–1855)
- Customs House in Frederikshavn (1854)
- Rector's building at Aarhus Cathedral School (1865)
- Aarhus Craftmen's Association's Asylum, Paradisgade 5–7 (1866–1867)
- Randers Monastery (1866–1869)
- Aarhus Haandværkerforening (1867–1868), Paradisgade 3
- Poverty and Dependency Institute in Aarhus (1869–1870)
- Åby Church, Aarhus (1872–1873)
- Viborg Town Hall (1872–1874, together with Julius Tholle)
- Aarhus Art Museum, now known as Huset (1876–1877)
- Customs Building, Nykøbing Mors (1878)
- Customs Building, Randers (1879–1880)
- Holme Church, Aarhus (1882)
- Gymnasium at Viborg Katedralskole (1882–1883)
- St Paul's Church, Aarhus (1884–1887)
- Customs Building, Thisted (1885)
- Skørring Kirke, Djursland (1886–1889)
- Aalborg Cathedral School (1886–1889)
- Gymnasium at Randers State School, Vestergade (1888–1890)
- Post and telegraph building, Brønderslev (1889)
- Post and telegraph building, Nykøbing Mors (1891–1892)
- Porch in Karup Church, Vendsyssel (1894)

=== Restoration ===
His restoration work includes:

- St Martin's Church, Næstved (1859)
- Church of Our Savior, Horsens (1866)
- Church of Our Lady, Aarhus (1865)
- Aarhus Cathedral (interior 1871, exterior 1882)
- St Martin's Church, Randers (1888)
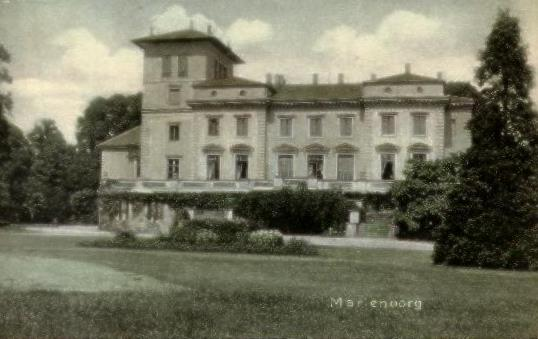
Marienborg Manor, Møn

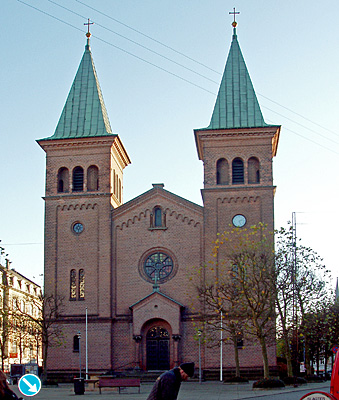
St Paul's Church, Aarhus

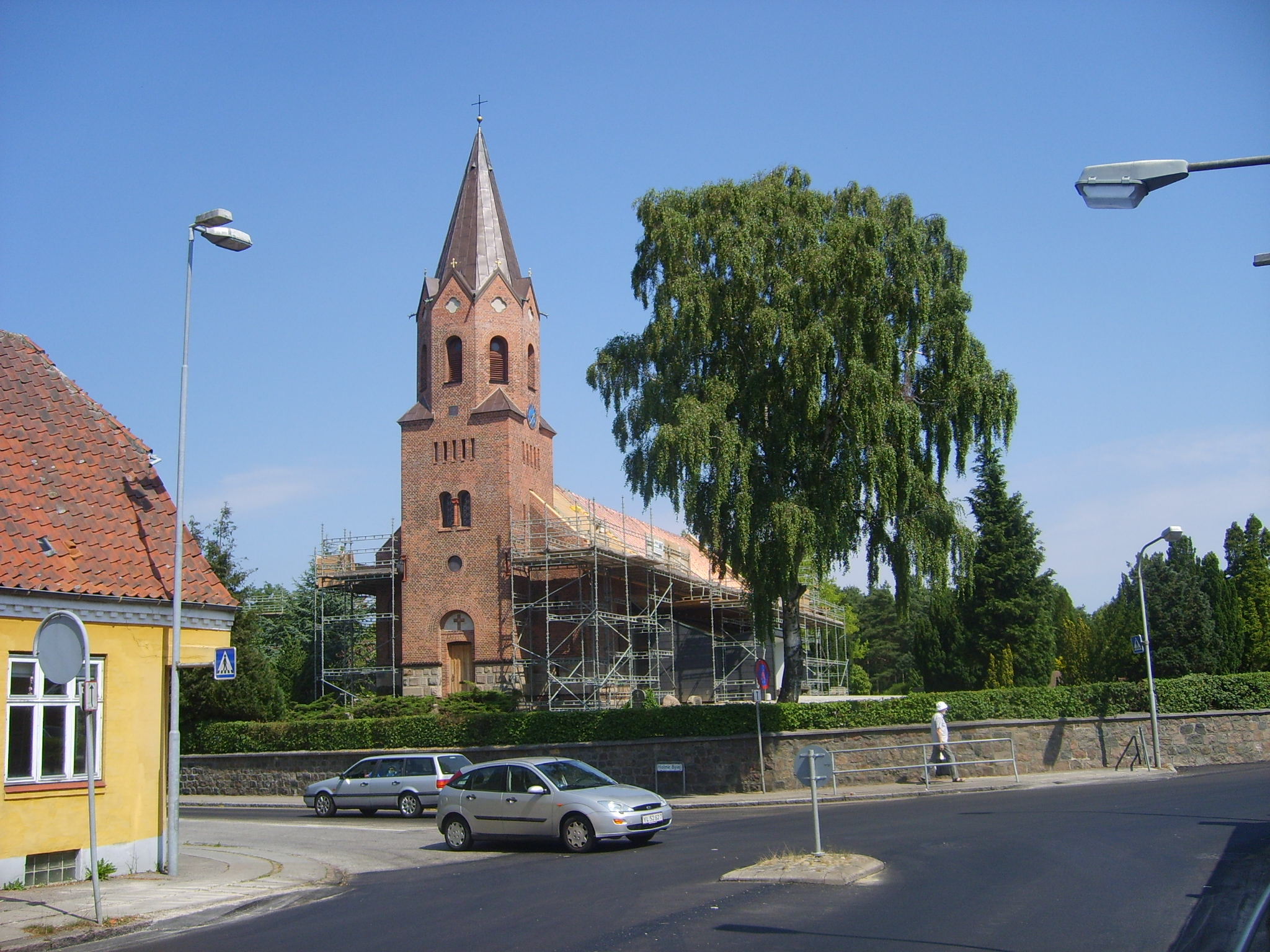
Holme Church, Aarhus

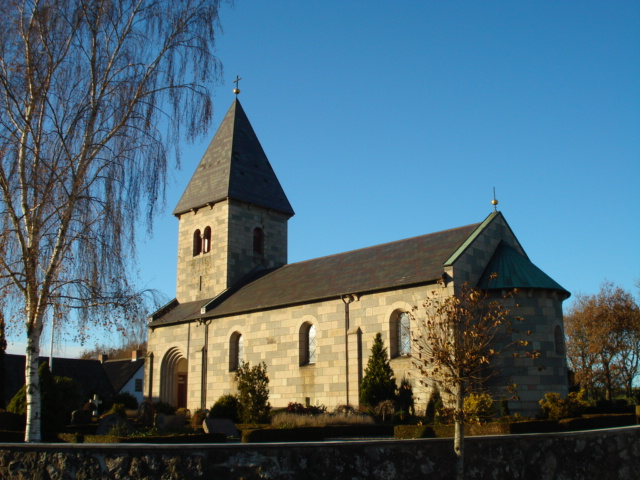
Skørring Church

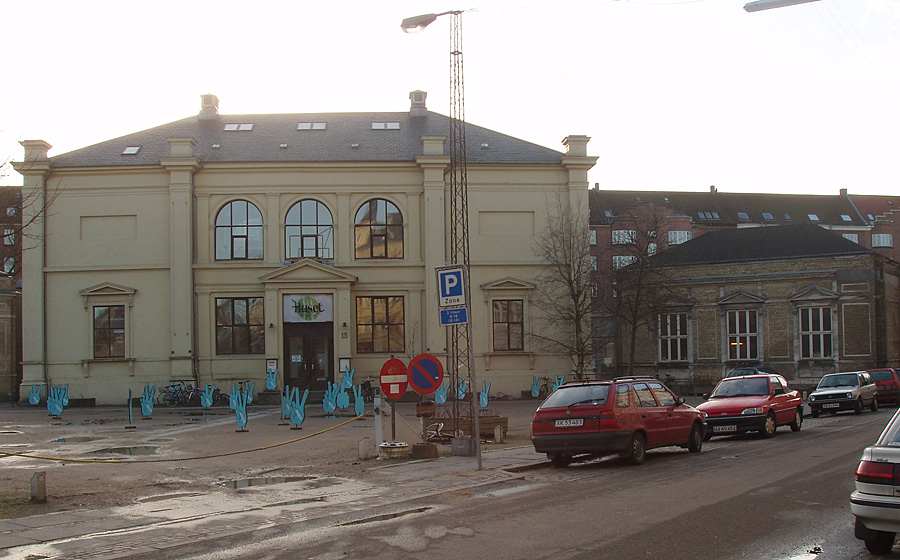
Aarhus Art Museum
