= Holme Church =

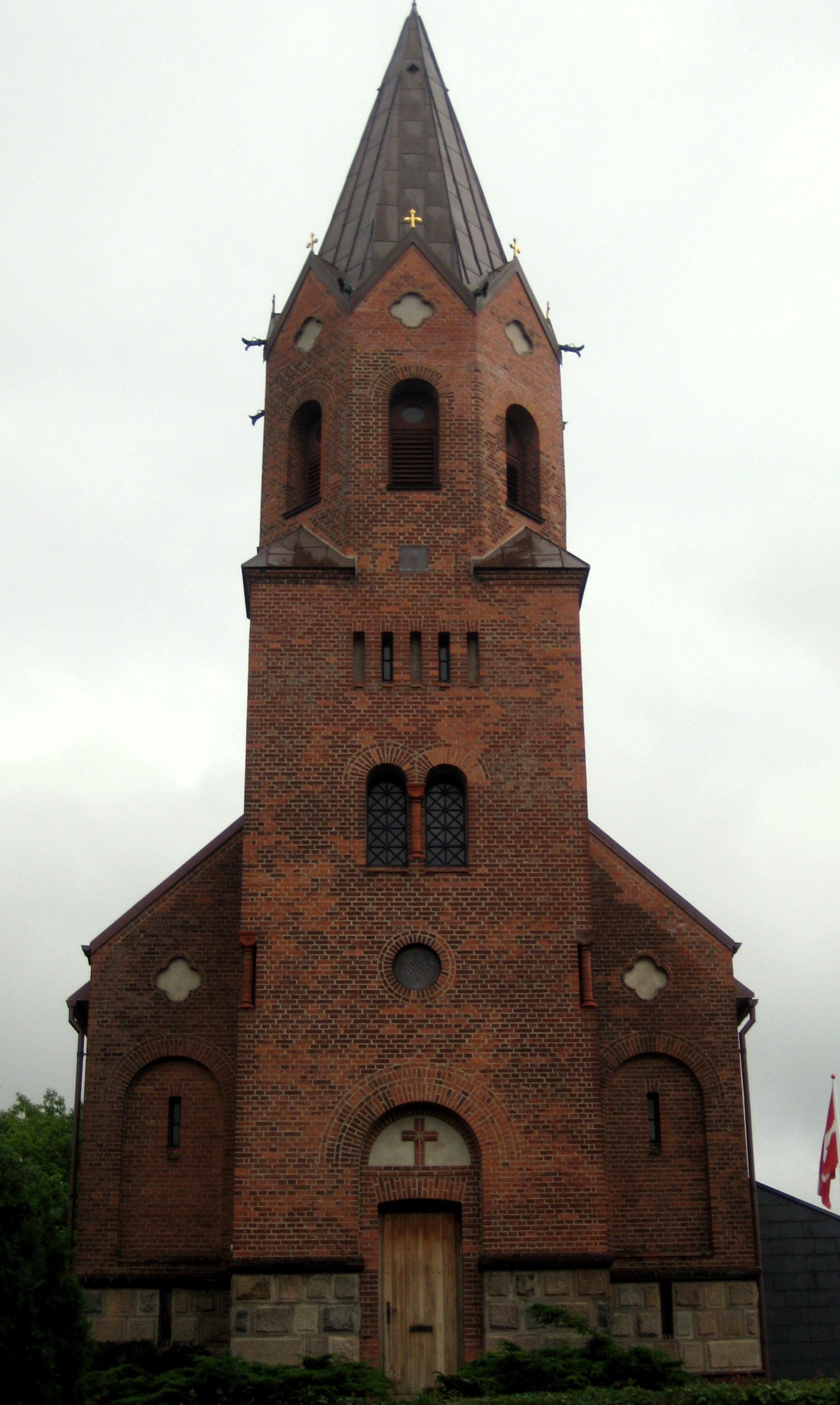
- Holme Church
- 56.114271°N 10.174339°E
- Location: Aarhus, Denmark
- Country: Denmark
- Denomination: Church of Denmark

History
- Status: Church

Architecture
- Completed: 1882

Specifications
- Materials: Brick

Administration
- Archdiocese: Diocese of Aarhus

Holme Church (Danish: Holme Kirke) is a church located in Holme Parish in Aarhus, Denmark in the neighbourhood Højbjerg, south of Midtbyen. The church is today a parish church within the Church of Denmark, serving a parish population of 10.296 (2015). The Holme pastorate is shared with the Lyseng Church to the south.

== History ==
The church is situated in the southern neighbourhood Højbjerg which was formerly a village but has now been incorporated in the city of Aarhus. The church was built in 1882 under the management of the royal building inspector Vilhelm Theodor Walther when it was determined to not be economical to renovate the original, dilapidated medieval church. The old church, known from Vilhelm Theodor Walther drawings, consisted 1882 of Romanesque chancel and nave with a porch in the south and a late Gothic tower in the west, the upper part of which was demolished c. 1690 and replaced by a ridge turret. The Romanesque structure was built of granite ashlar on a chamfered base. The new church renovated in 1968-69 and again in 2012. The parish was formerly a part of Skåde parish but was segregated into a church district in 1838 and made an independent parish in 1949.

In and around the new church, five Romanesque lintels and two moulded string courses are preserved. The latter were originally in the chancel arch. Some furniture from the demolished church was transferred to the new one in 1882; this is true of the altarpiece from 1637, the pewends from 1688 and the crucifix from about the same time. Some items in use are the chalice from 1727, the altar candlesticks from 1675-1700 and the Romanesque baptismal font which corresponds exactly to the one in Beder, and also the votive ship, a frigate from c. 1750. The rest of the furniture has more recently replaced that from 1882. - A priest's sepulchral tablet from c. 1682, with a portrait painting, is a copy of a bishop's sepulchral tablet in Århus cathedral; the painting has parallels in the same place as well as in the Church of Our Lady in Århus.

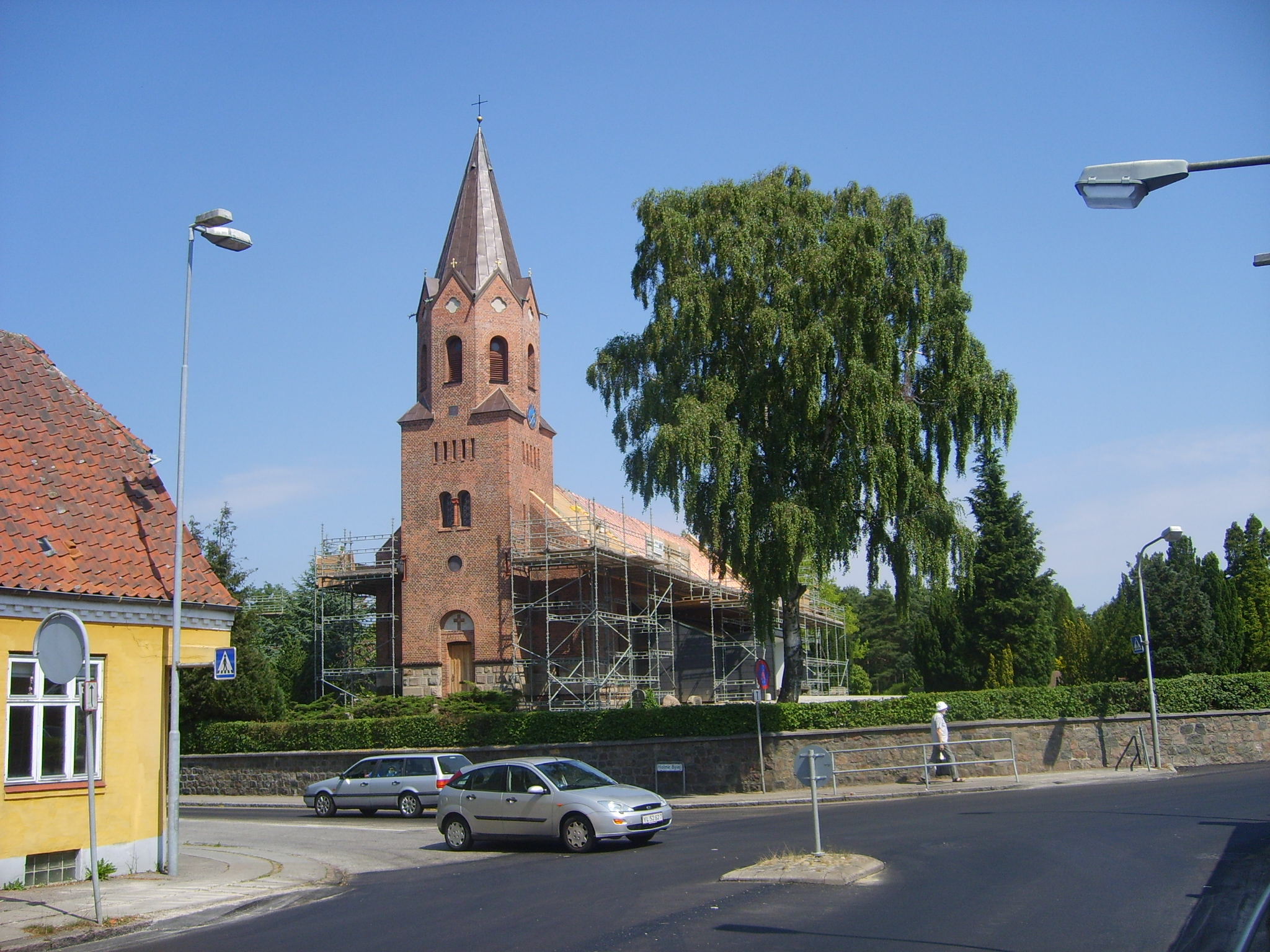

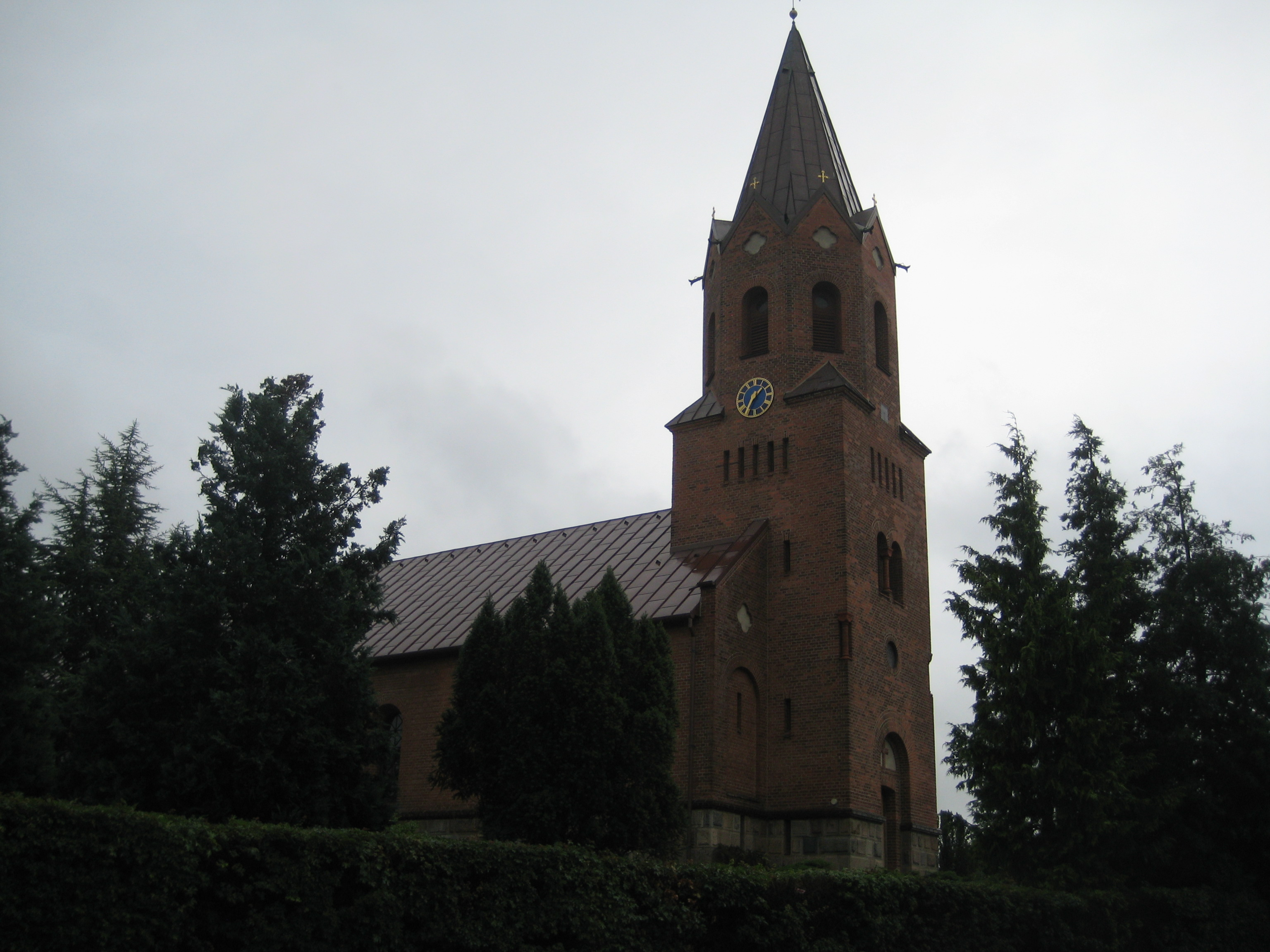

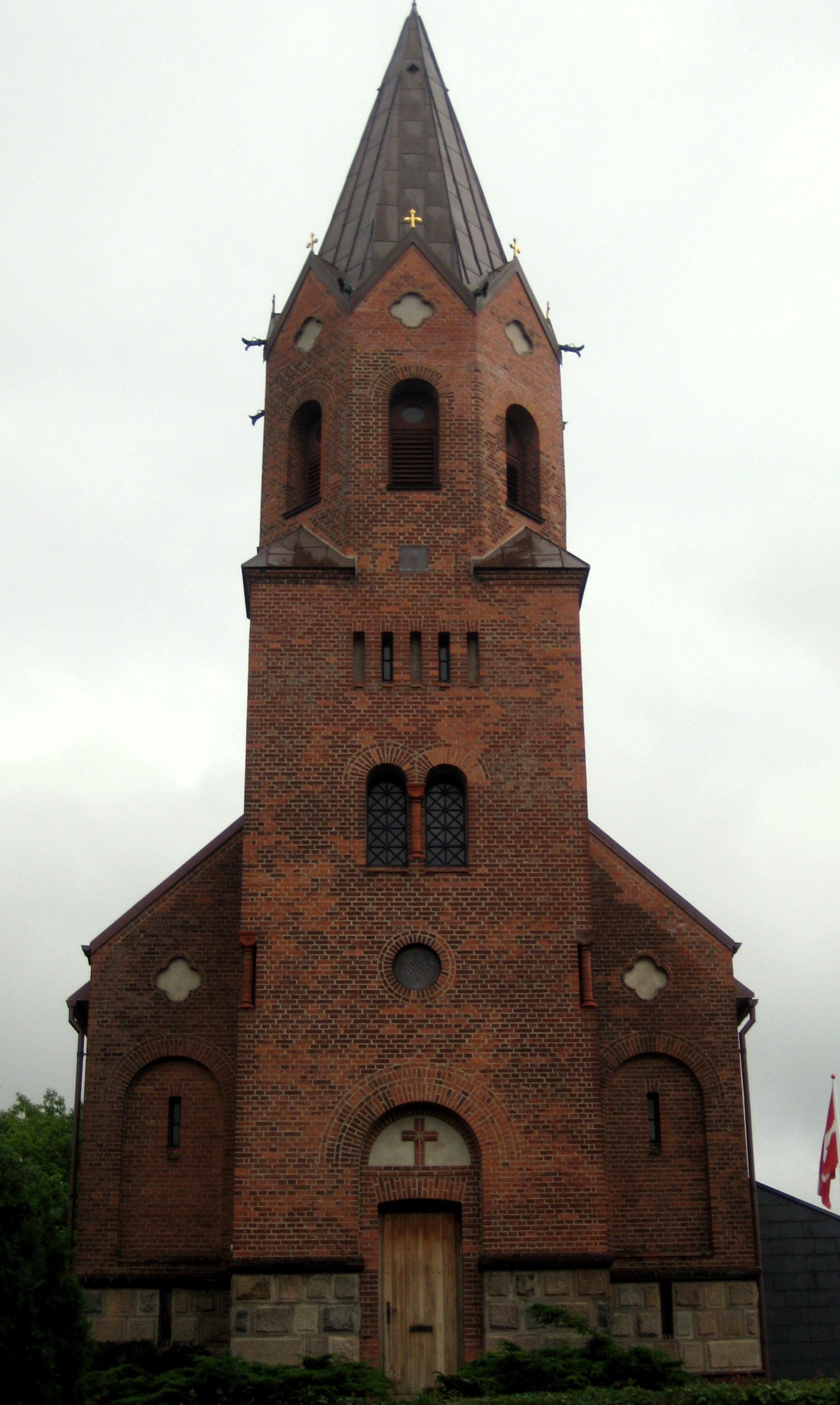

== See also ==
- List of Churches in Aarhus
