= Skjørring =

Town in Jutland, Denmark

- Town
- Location in Denmark
- Coordinates: 56°10′52″N 9°53′9″E
- Country: Denmark
- Region: Central Denmark Region
- Municipality: Skanderborg

Population (2026)
  - Total: 258
- Time zone: UTC+1 (CET)
  - Summer (DST): UTC+2 (CEST)

Skjørring is a village and parish in the Municipality of Skanderborg, Jutland, Denmark. As of 1 January 2026 it had a population of 258. Skjørring is located 3 km north of Galten and 21 km west of Aarhus.

Skjørring Church is a building of note in the village, designed by Vilhelm Theodor Walther.
