= St. Paul's Church, Aarhus =

St Paul's Church
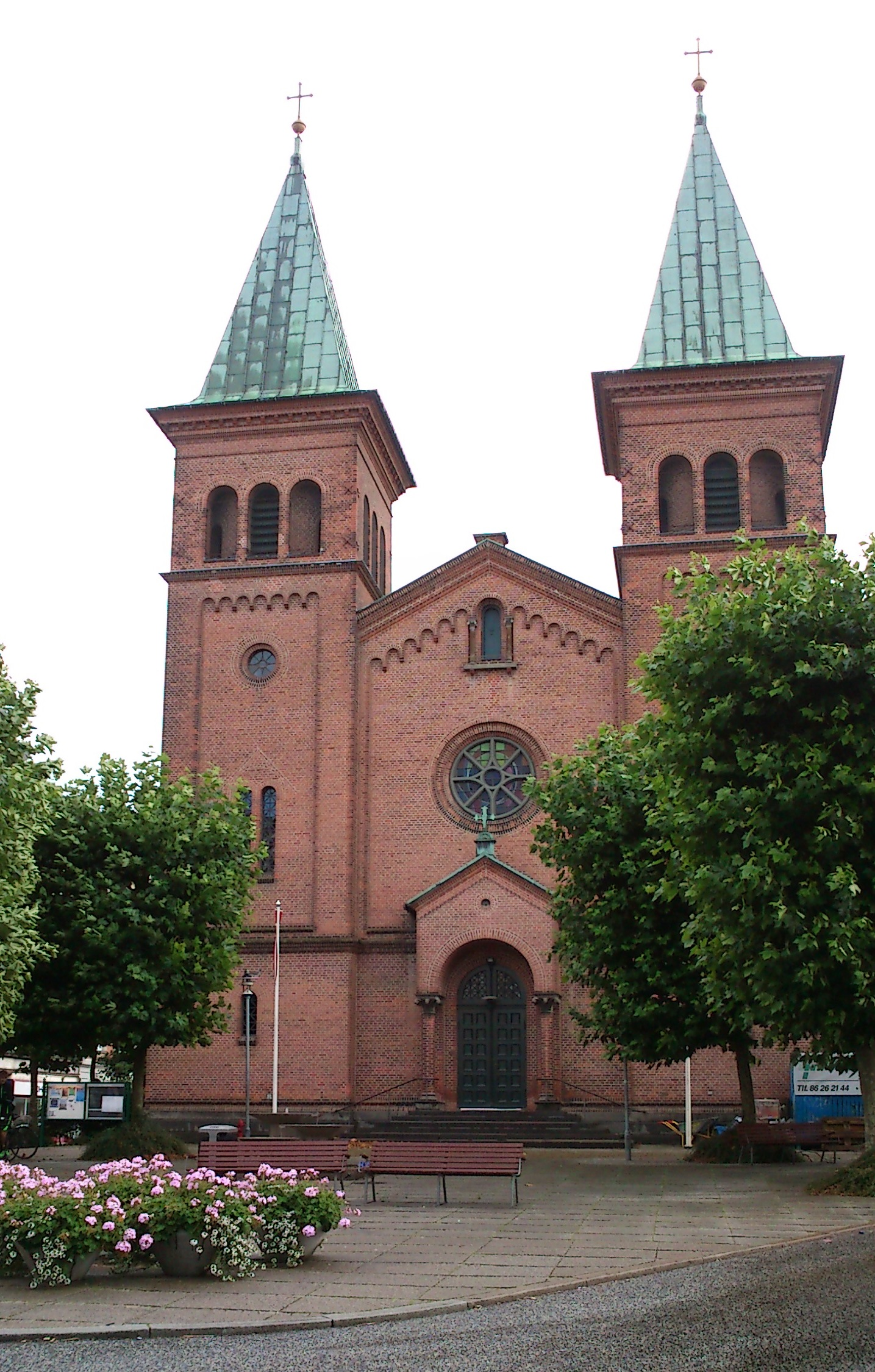
- St Paul's Church
- 56.1459°N 10.2038°E
- Location: Sankt Pauls Kirkeplads 1; 8000 Aarhus
- Country: Denmark
- Denomination: Church of Denmark

History
- Status: Church

Architecture
- Completed: 1887

Specifications
- Materials: Brick

Administration
- Archdiocese: Diocese of Aarhus

St Paul's Church (Danish: Sankt Pauls Kirke) is a parish church in Aarhus, Denmark. It was completed in 1887 to a design by Vilhelm Theodor Walther in the Neo-Romanesque style.

== Description ==
Located at the end of the slightly inclined M. P. Bruunsgade, the church was designed by Vilhelm Theodor Walther, Jutland's royal inspector of buildings, on land which was donated by the textile manufacturer Mads Pagh Bruun on condition the church should look towards the town. As a result, the robust, red brick building with twin towers bearing pyramidal spires has a facade facing north rather than west. The design is based on that of a Romanesque basilica with a long high nave, slightly lower aisles and an apse. The round-arched windows and doors are indicative of the Romanesque approach.

In 1978, a parish hall was attached to the church in a manner similar to that of the Oude Kerk in Amsterdam which also has buildings attached to its structure. It was designed by Inger and Johannes Exner as a fan-shaped attachment with a meeting room, confirmation classrooms and offices. It is connected to the apse by means of a foyer with a glazed roof. Built of sharp-edged brick matching the masonry of the church, it is covered with a saddle roof.

== Interior ==
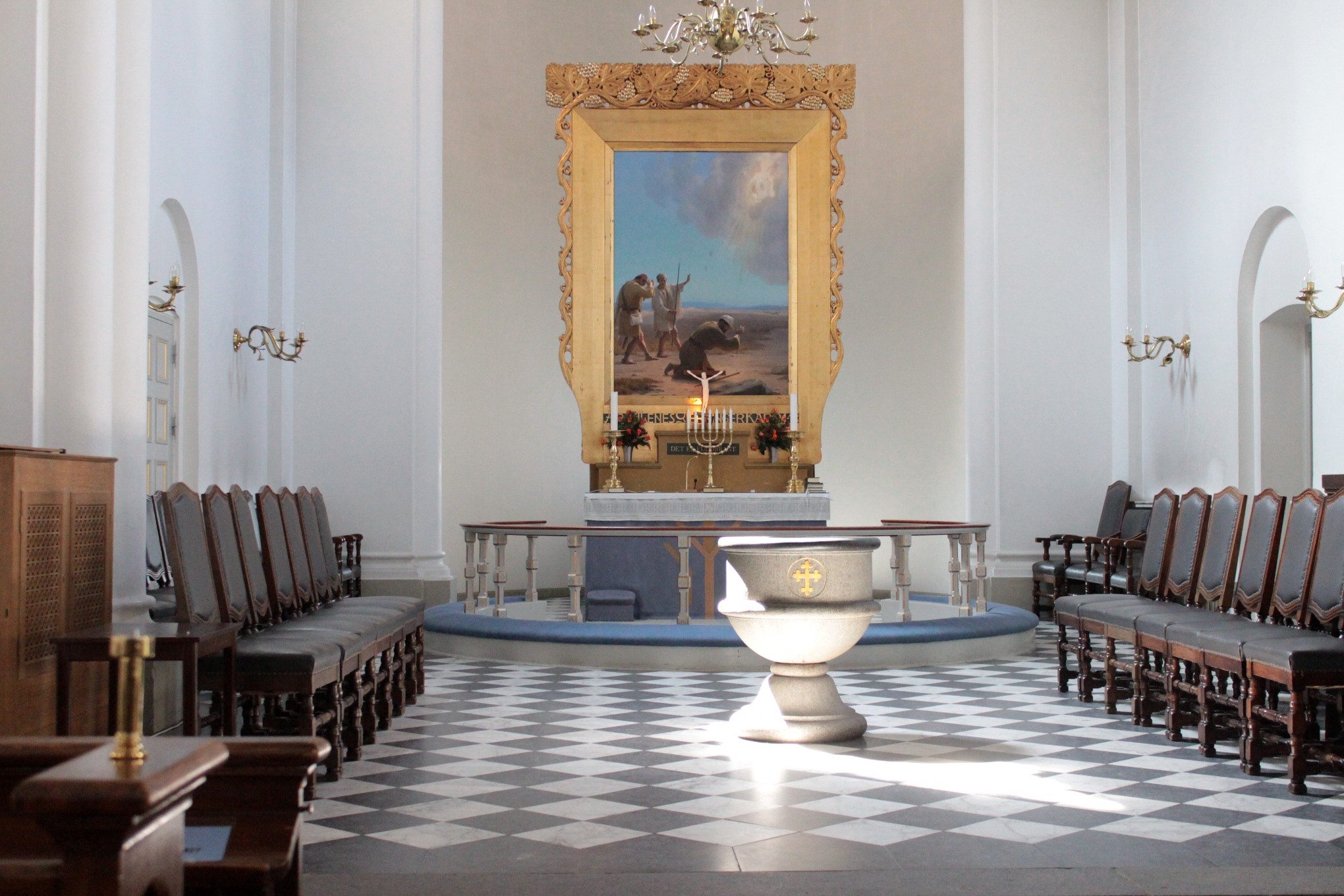
At the altar in St. Paul's Church.

The altar painting (1897) depicting Paul on the road to Damascus is the work of Herman Siegumfeldt (1833-1912). Since the church's completion, a gallery was added in 1900. A baptismal bowl (no longer in use), from the second half of the 16th century, is in silver-plated brass. Crafted in the south of Germany, the centre of the bowl presents a scene of the Annunciation, bordered by floral decorations. The rim is decorated with stars and pomegranates.

== Church choir ==
The church choir, known as Sct. Pauls Cantori, consists mainly of young singers studying at the Royal Academy of Music in Aarhus or at Aarhus University. They have frequently performed with professional orchestras including the Randers Chamber Orchestra.
