= Holme, Aarhus =

Holme
- Neighborhood
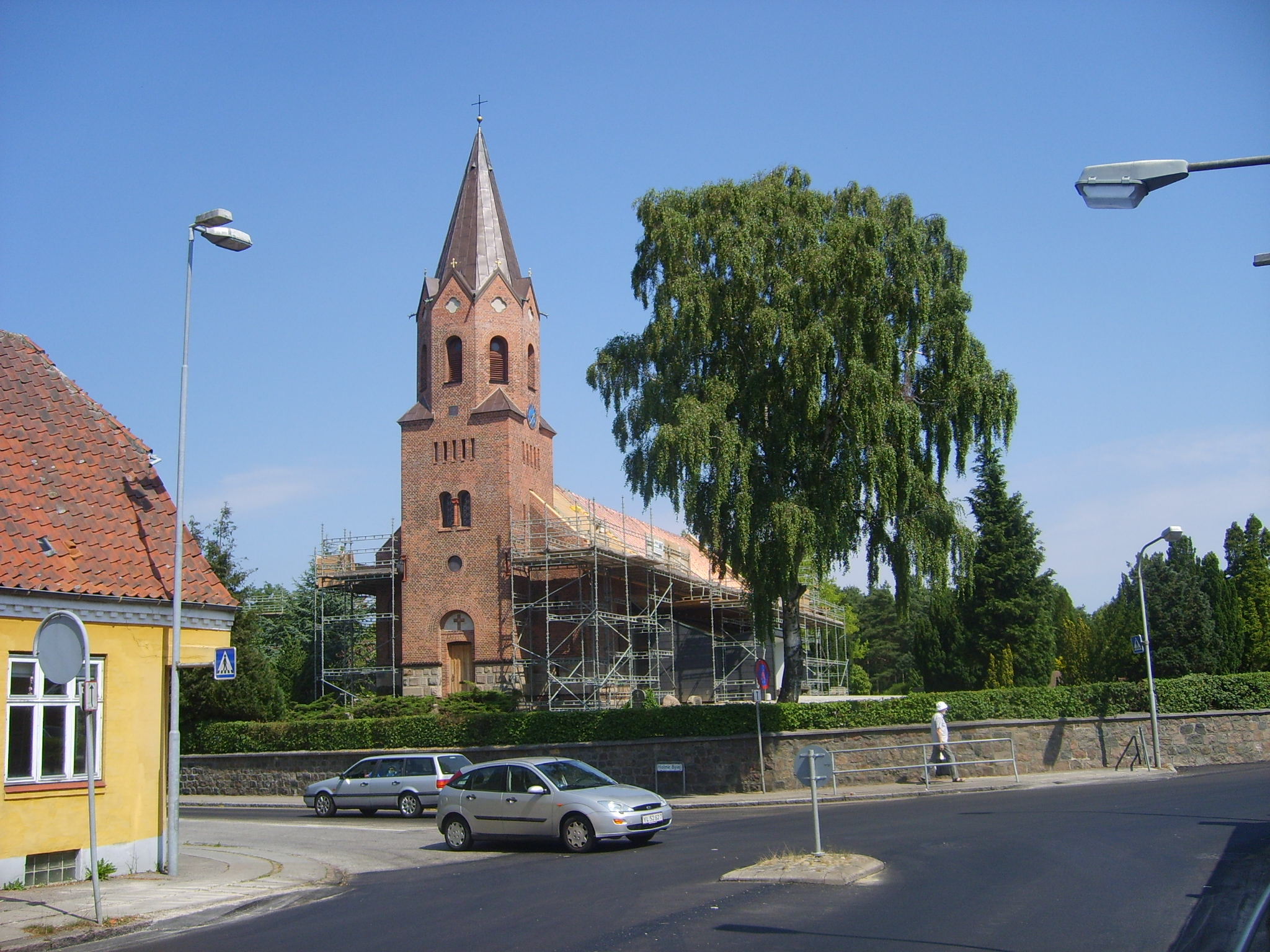
- Holme Church

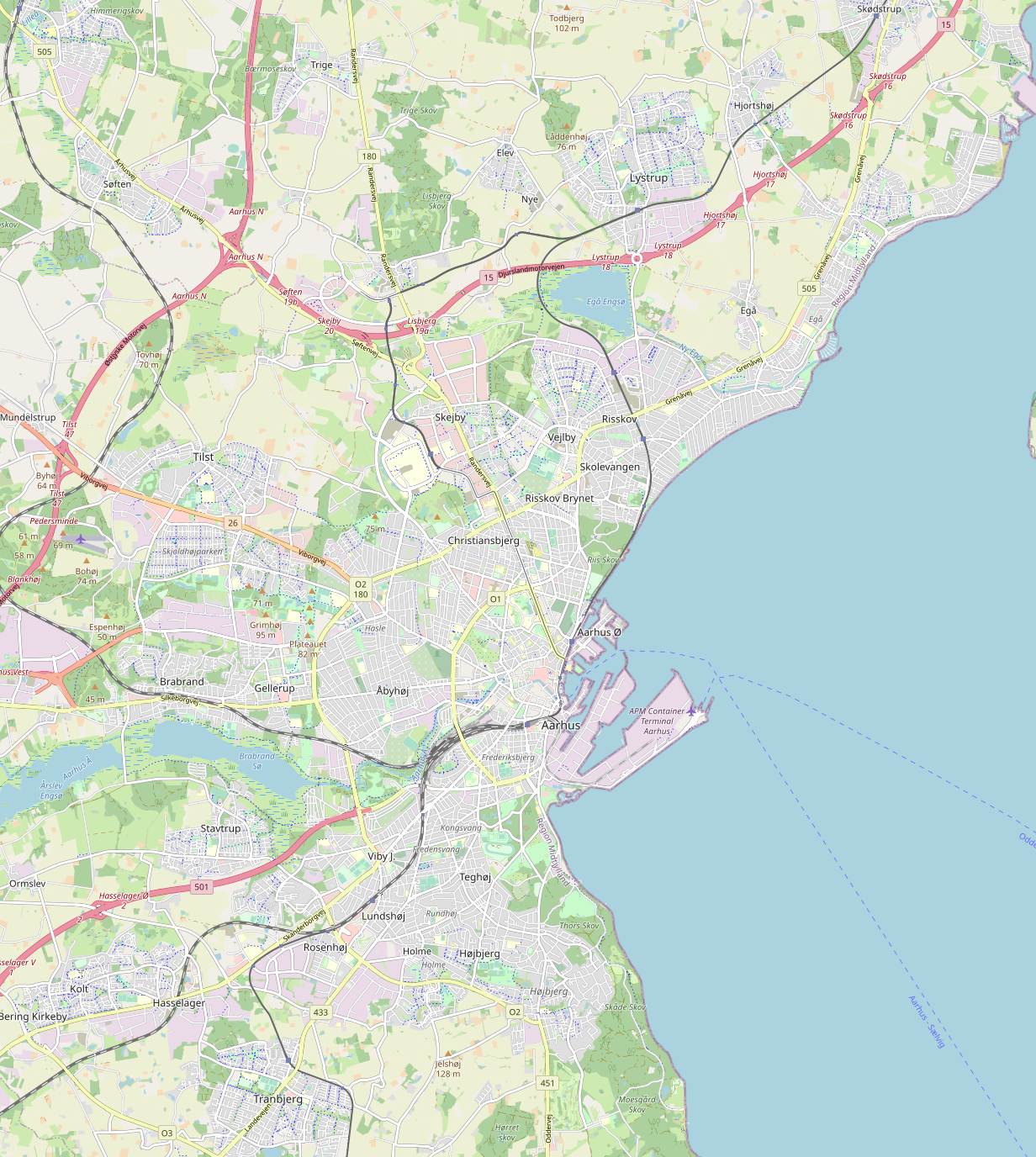
- Location within Aarhus
- Coordinates: 56.111853°N 10.177921°E
- Country: Kingdom of Denmark
- Regions of Denmark: Central Denmark Region
- Municipality: Aarhus Municipality
- District: Højbjerg
- Postal code: 8270

Holme is a neighbourhood in the district of Højbjerg in Aarhus, Denmark. It is located 5km south of the city center.

The Ring 2 ring road pass through Holme. This stretch is known as Ringvej Syd.

== Gallery ==
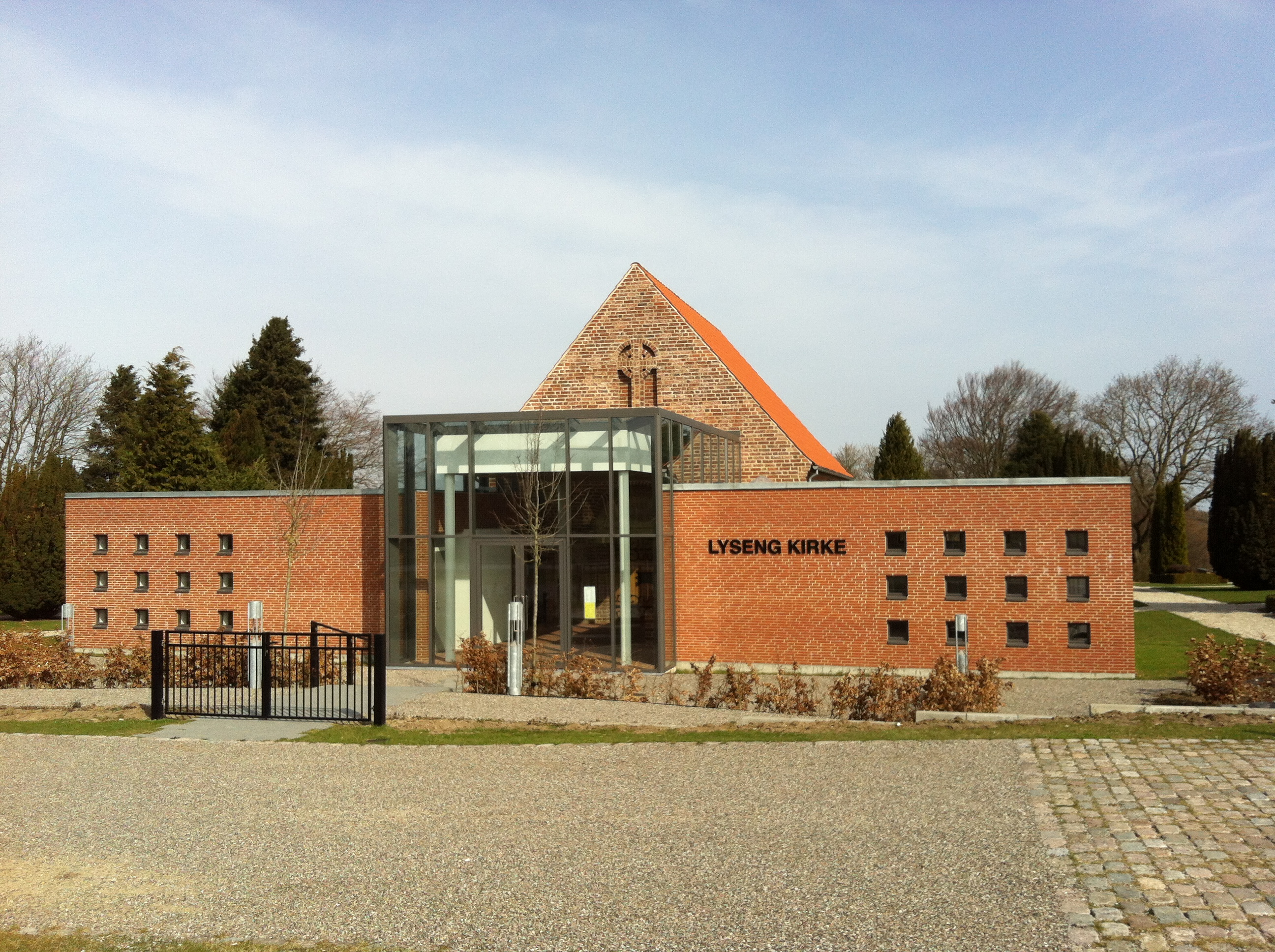
Lyseng Church, a church in red brick from 1913.

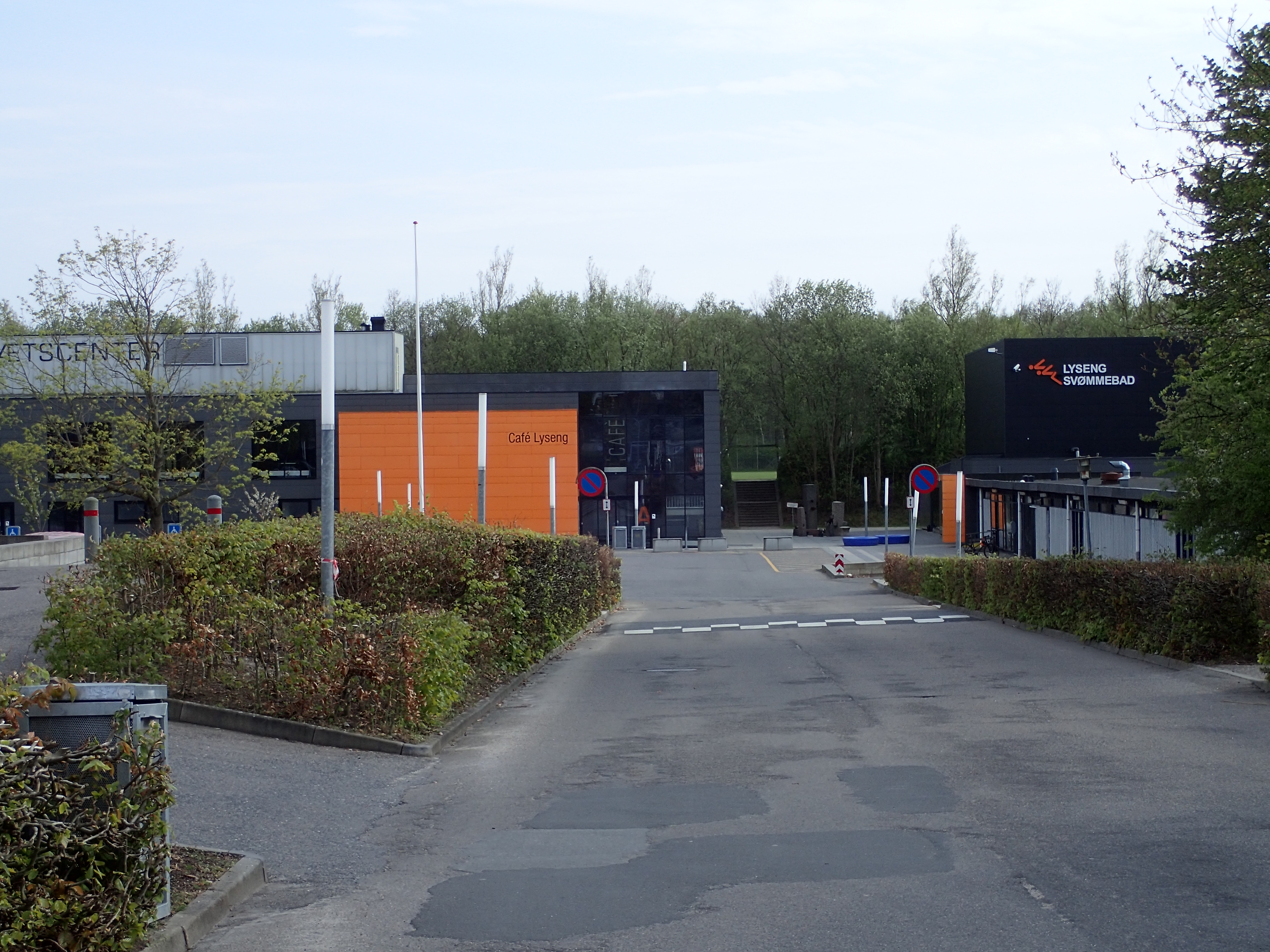
Lyseng Idrætscenter, a sports centre with a swimminghall.
