= Højbjerg =

- Postal district
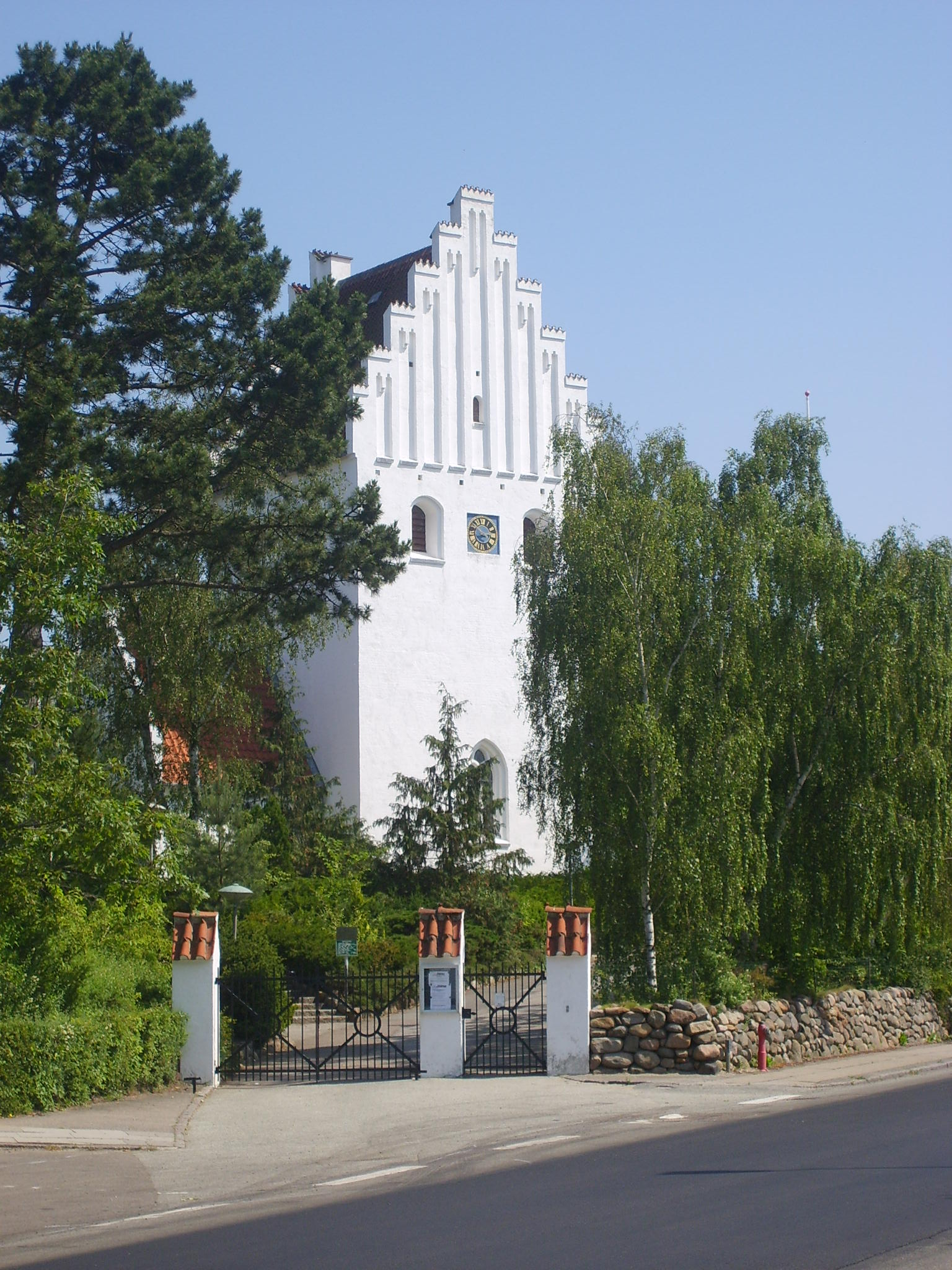
- Frederick's Church in Højbjerg

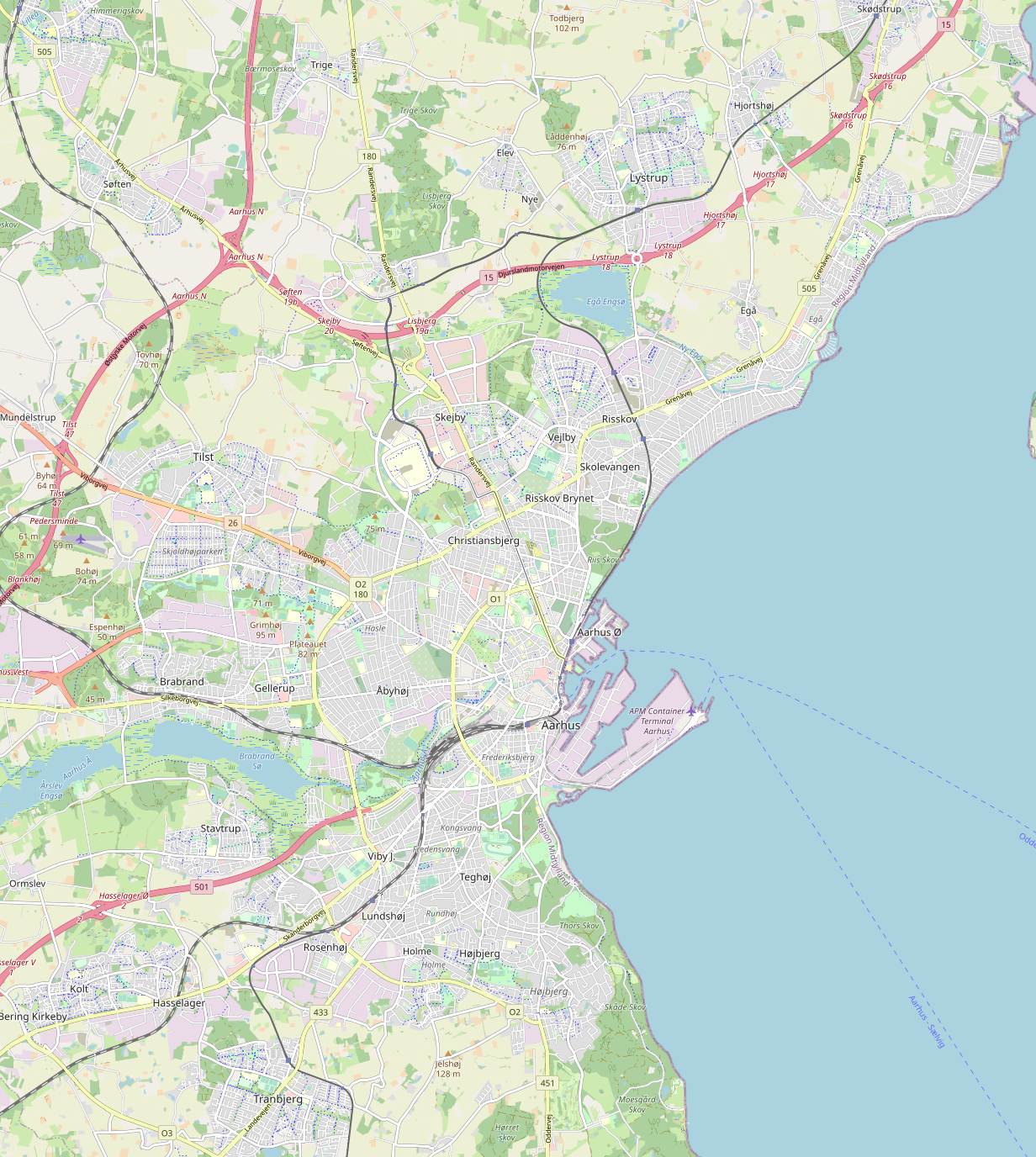
- Location within Aarhus
- Coordinates: 56.116459°N 10.201966°E
- Country: Kingdom of Denmark
- Regions of Denmark: Central Denmark Region
- Municipality: Aarhus Municipality
- District: Højbjerg
- Postal code: 8270

Højbjerg is a postal district of Aarhus, Denmark.

Højbjerg originated as a coastal suburb to the south of Aarhus, but has now completely merged with the city. Højbjerg is located 5 km from the city centre and had a population of 22,000 in 2005.

Skåde, Holme and Fredensvang are neighbourhoods within and subdivisions of Højbjerg.

The historic manor of Moesgård and the related estate, including the Moesgård Museum and parts of the Marselisborg Forests are all situated in Højbjerg. IF Lyseng, one of Denmark's largest sports clubs in terms of membership, is also located in Højbjerg.

== Gallery ==
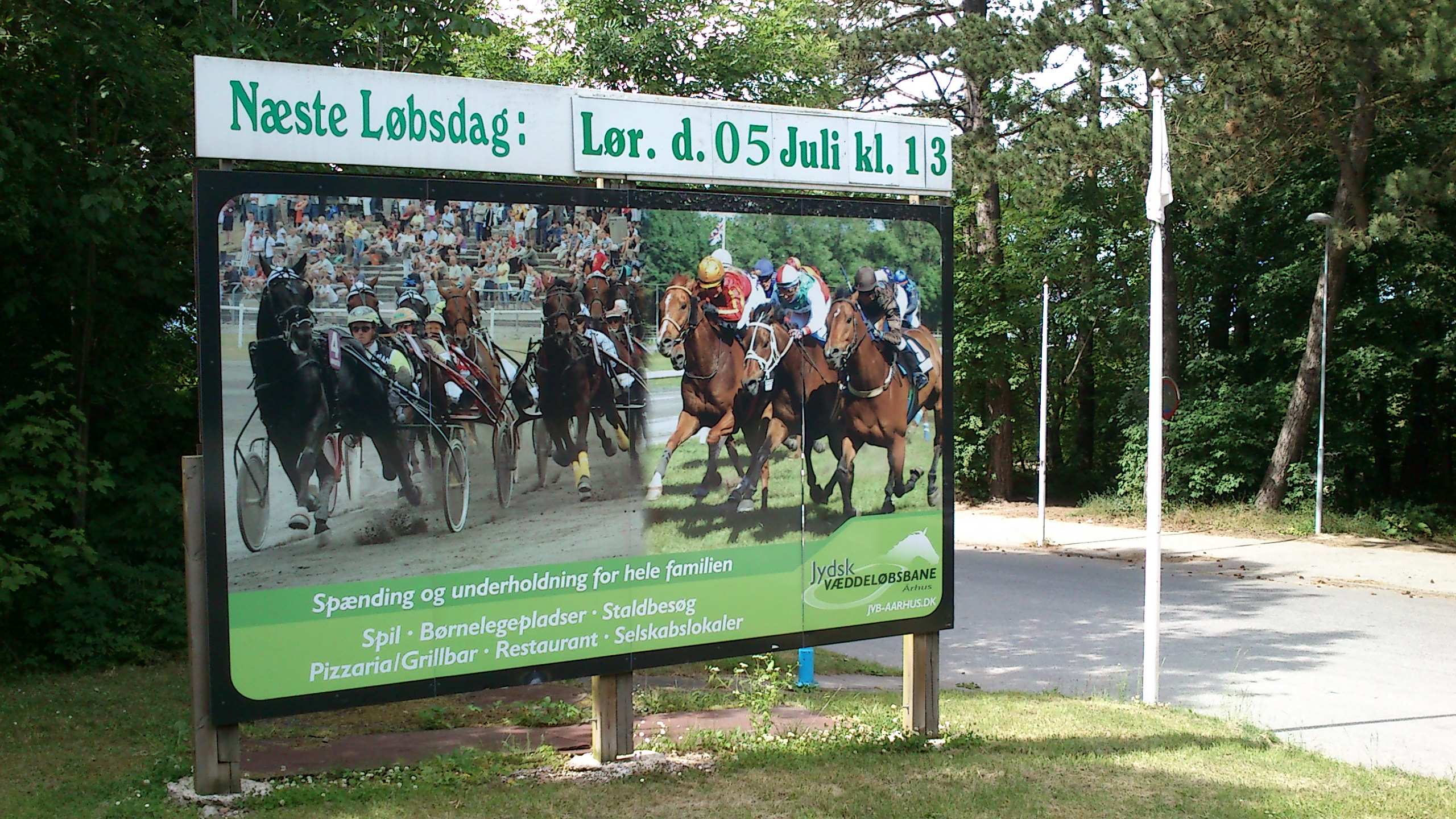
The racecourse of Jydsk Væddeløbsbane.

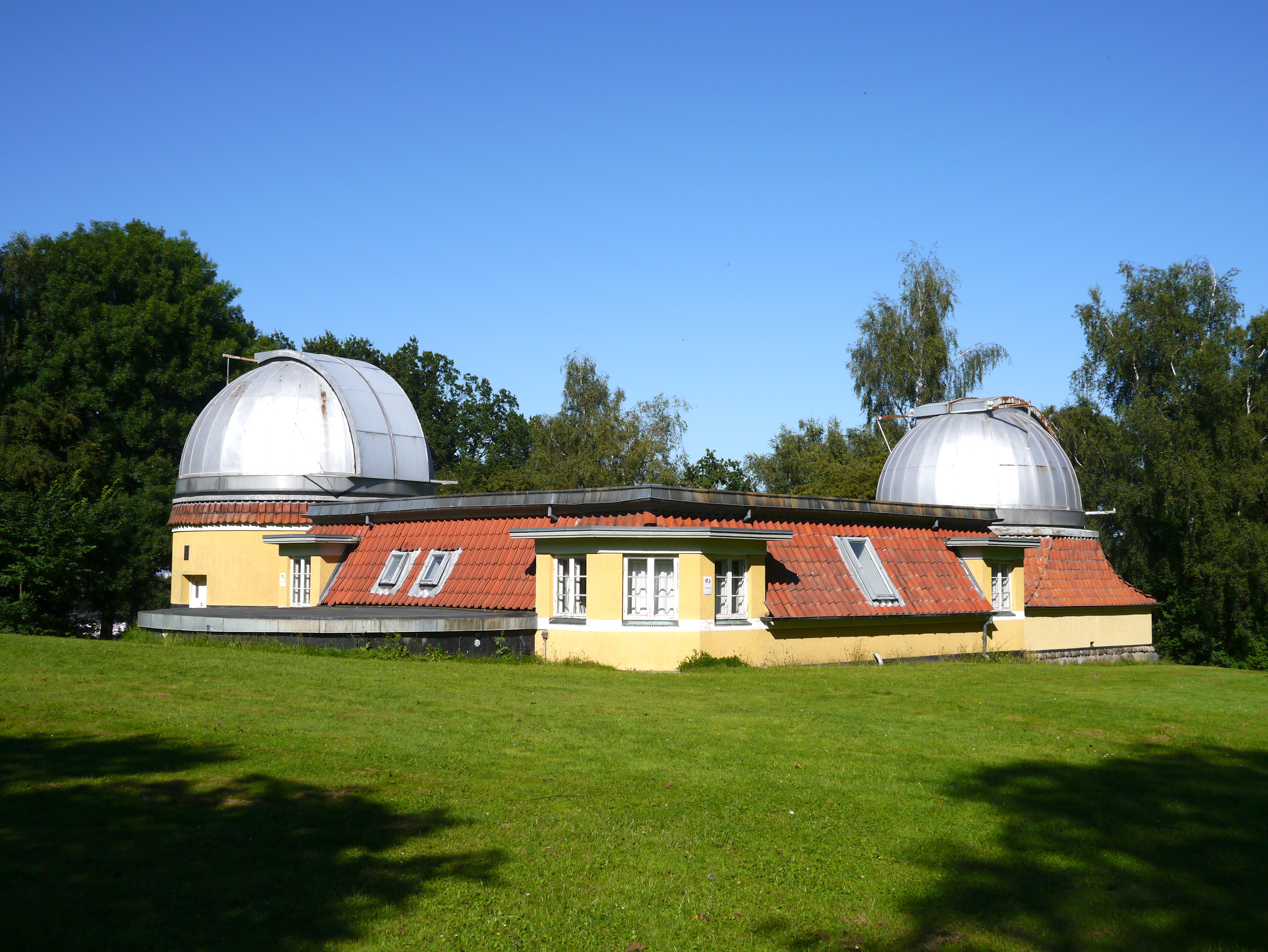
The Ole Rømer Observatory.

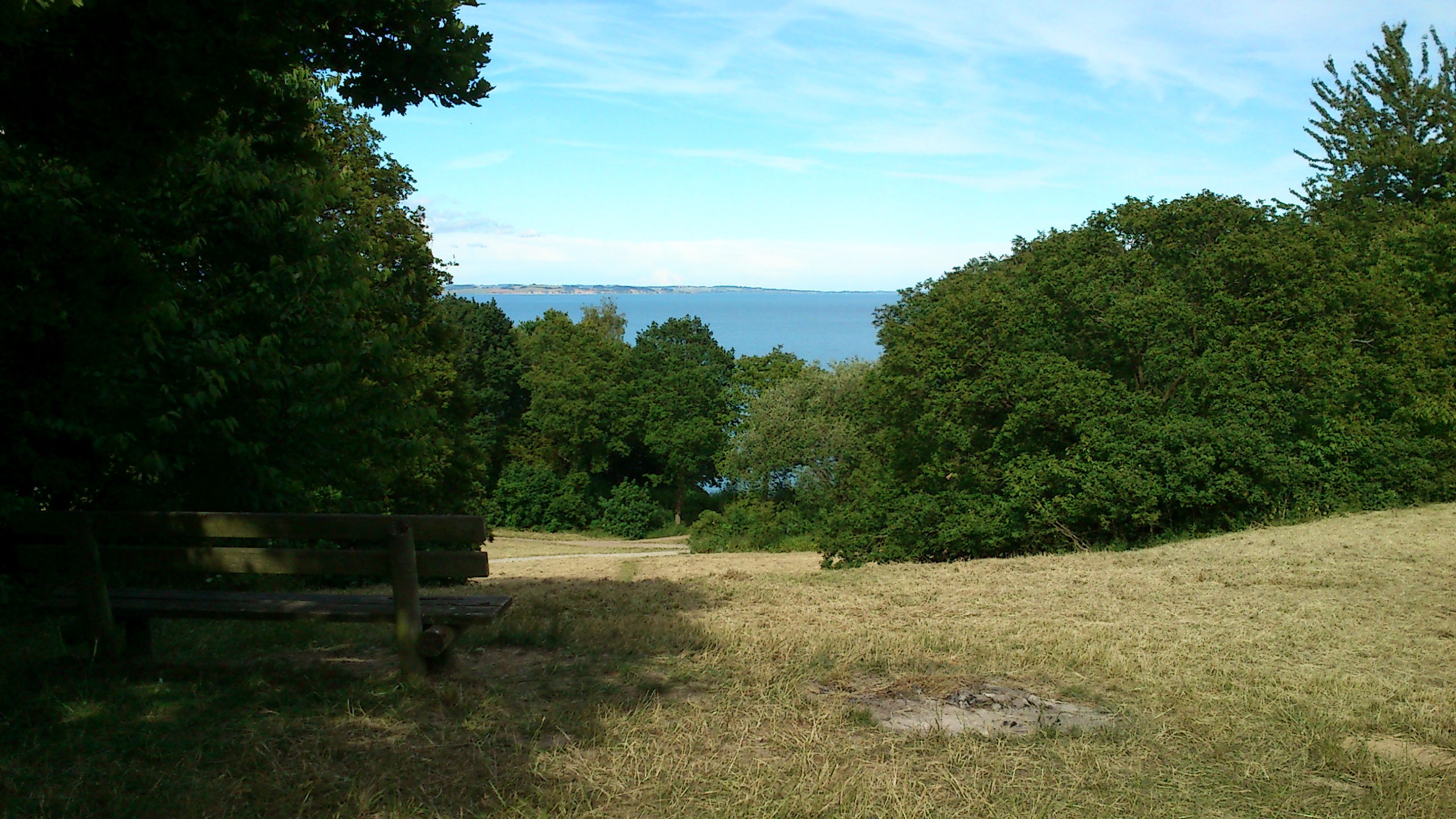
Hørhaven, a parklike area in the Marselisborg Forests.

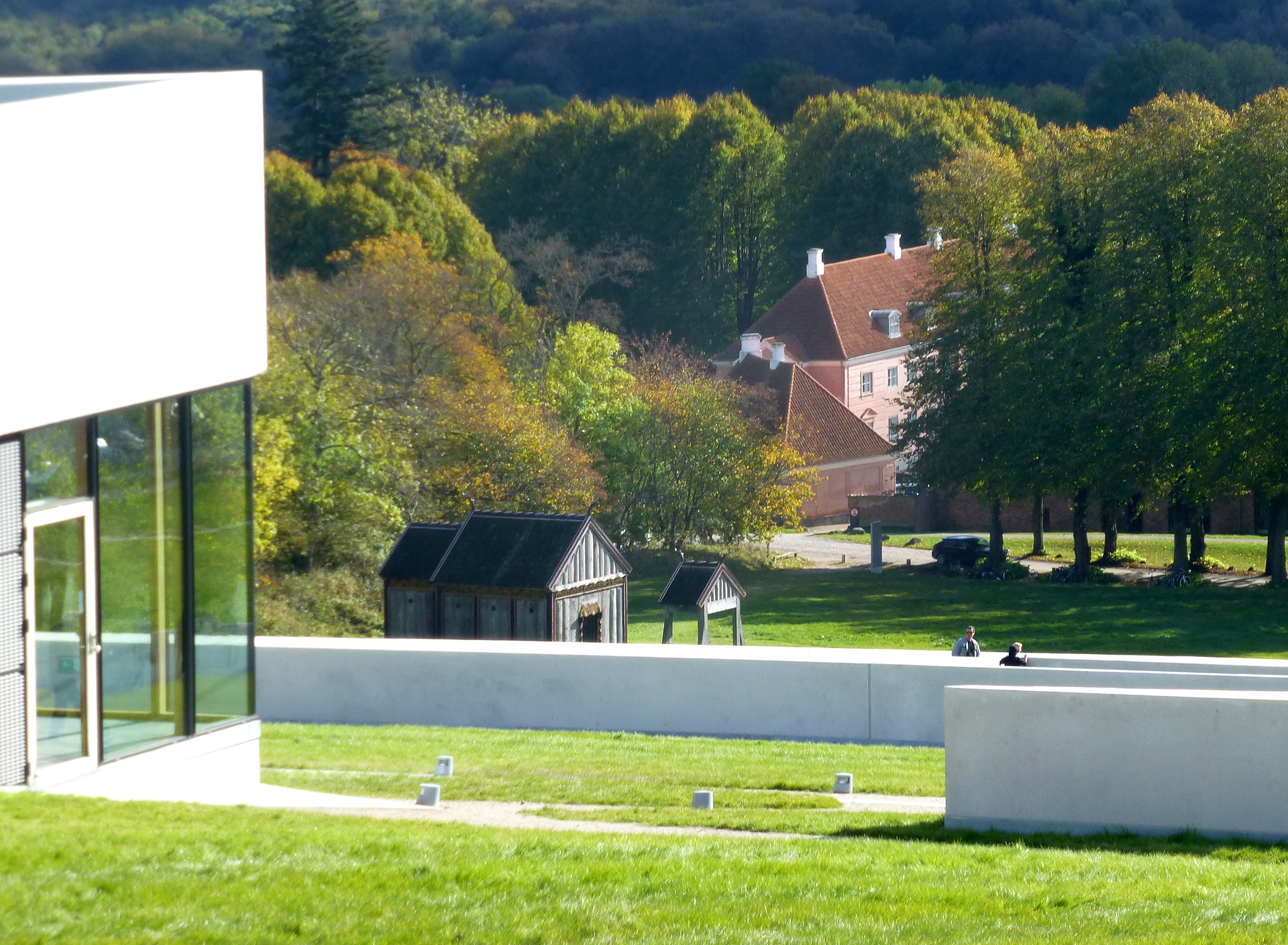
View from the Moesgård Museum across the Moesgård estate.

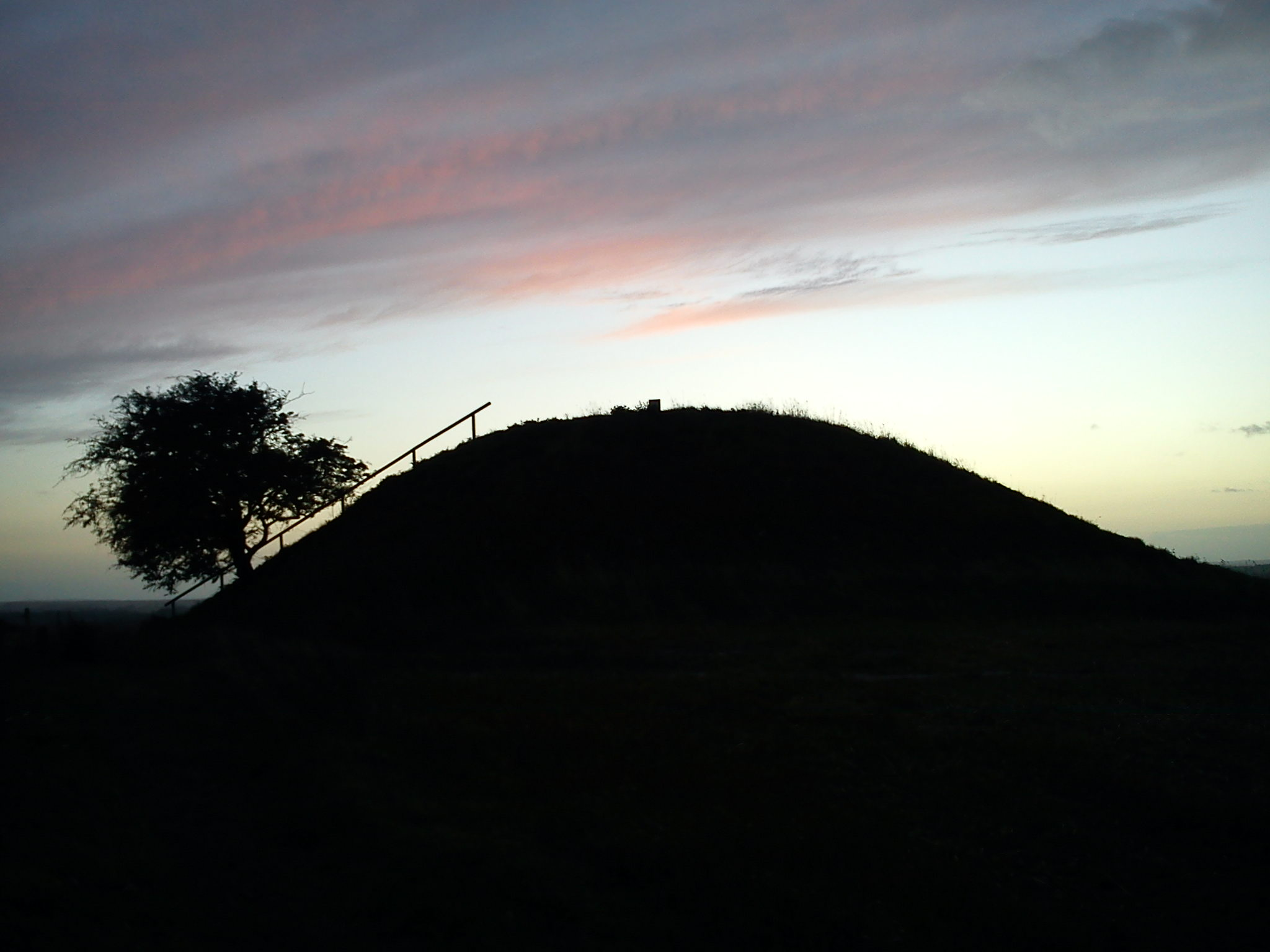
Jelshøj, the highest point in Aarhus Municipality at 128 m.

== See also ==
Other postal districts of Aarhus includes:

- Viby J
- Brabrand
- Aarhus V
- Aarhus N
- Aarhus C

== Sources ==
- Børge Møller-Madsen, Billeder af Højbjergs historie. Aarhus Universitetsforlag 1997. ISBN 87 7288 684 6. (in Danish)
- Højbjerg Holme Lokalhistoriske Arkiv Archive on local history (in Danish)
