= George Gitau =

Kenyan humanitarian

- Born: 20 October 1961 (age 64); Nairobi, Kenya
- Education: University of Nairobi (BA); University of Pittsburgh (MPIA)
- Occupation: Executive
- Years active: 1994-
- Employers: Center For Leadership Excellence (2021-); ALM (2017–2021); World Vision (2010–2017); Compassion (1997–2010)
- Notable work: Director at Compassion, World Vision, and at ALM

George Gitau (born 20 October 1961) is a Kenyan humanitarian leader. George worked for American Leprosy Missions (ALM) as their regional director for Africa from August 2017 to July 2021. Prior to this appointment, he worked for World Vision International as the Rwanda country director for seven years, from March 2010 to July 2017, while residing in Kigali. George had previously worked for Compassion International for thirteen years in a row in a variety of roles, including director of grants for the Africa region from November 2006 to February 2010, country director for Burkina Faso from December 2003 to August 2006, and country director for Kenya from September 1997 to December 2003.

As an African humanitarian employed by several nonprofit global organizations, including World Vision, Compassion, and American Leprosy Missions (ALM), George oversaw continent and country level impactful and sustainable on-the-ground initiatives to improve the lives of the impoverished in a number of African nations, including Rwanda, Kenya, Ethiopia, Burkina Faso, Uganda, Tanzania, Ghana, Liberia, Ivory Coast, Nigeria, DR Congo, Republic of the Congo and Togo.

== Early life and education ==
George was born on 20 October 1961; he grew up and completed his elementary and secondary education in Kenya. George began his graduate studies in 1983 at the University of Nairobi, Kenya. He earned a bachelor's degree in Rural Sociology in 1986. George also enrolled in University of Pittsburgh in Pennsylvania, U.S. in 1994 to pursue a postgraduate degree, and he earned a Master in Public and International Affairs (MPIA) with a focus on development economics in 1995.

== Career ==
George started with World Vision Kenya in 1987 and went to USA for graduate school where he also worked with Westinghouse Electric, World Vision USA and Homewood Brushton Corporation where he was honoured in the Pittsburgh Tribune by the Mayor of Pittsburgh as key resource for Business growth in South Western Pennsylvania. He moved back to Kenya as a country director for Compassion International in Kenya in September 1997. The position he kept until December 2003, when he relocated to Ouagadougou, where he worked for the same organization as the country director for Burkina Faso until August 2006. George was promoted in November 2006 and appointed by Compassion International as the Programs director for the Africa region. He held this role until February 2010.

In 2010, George left Compassion after 13 years of service, and he became the Rwanda country director for World Vision, a position he held until 2017. During his time there, World Vision Rwanda concentrated on empowering rural communities to advance development, particularly those affected by the 1994 Genocide against the Tutsi. George began working with American Leprosy Missions (ALM) in August 2017. ALM is a Christian global health and development organization that provides assistance to vulnerable individuals afflicted with neglected tropical diseases (NTDs). Based in South Carolina, he was their regional director for Africa until July 2021. George has been serving as Operations Director for East Africa at the Center for Leadership Excellence (CLE) since September 2021.

== Other considerations ==
While serving as country director of World Vision Rwanda, George Gitau Gitau held high level engagements with president Bill Clinton and other presidents and introduced World Vision representatives led by former President Kevin Jenkins to President Paul Kagame at Village Urugwiro in June 2016. Paul Kagame was accompanied by his then-Minister of Foreign Affairs, Louise Mushikiwabo, and Local Government Minister, Francis Kaboneka. World Vision was promised ongoing government support and friendly working relations with Rwanda by President Paul Kagame. George is consulted by many international organizations on how to excel in their areas of service and on how to mobilize and grow their financial resources.

== See also ==
- World Vision International
