= Kim Hong-il (general) =

South Korean politician (1898–1980)

The Right Honourable Kim Hong-il
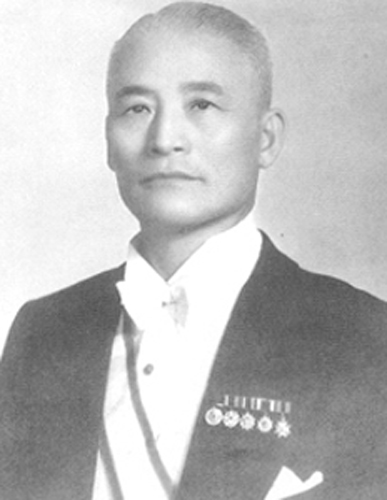
- Kim Hong-il in 1961

Minister of Foreign Affairs
- In office 21 May 1961 – 21 July 1961
- President: Yun Posun
- Preceded by: Chung Il-hyung
- Succeeded by: Song Yo-chan

Personal details
- Born: 23 September 1898 Ryongchon County, North Pyongan Province, Korean Empire
- Died: 8 August 1980 (aged 81) Hyochang-dong, Yongsan District, Seoul, South Korea
- Spouse(s): Min Gyeong-ran (민경란; 閔景蘭)
- Children: Three sons

Military service
- Allegiance: Republic of China; South Korea
- Branch/service: National Revolutionary Army; Republic of Korea Army
- Years of service: 1920–1951
- Rank: Lieutenant General; Lieutenant General
- Commands: Northeast Security Command; Capital Division; I Corps
- Battles/wars: Russian Civil War; Northern Expedition; Second Sino-Japanese War; Korean War; First Battle of Seoul; Battle of Pusan Perimeter

Korean name
- Hangul: 김홍일
- Hanja: 金弘壹
- RR: Gim Hongil
- MR: Kim Hongil

Kim Hong-il (Korean: 김홍일; Hanja: 金弘壹; 23 September 1898 – 8 August 1980) was a Korean independence activist and a general of the Second Sino-Japanese War and the Korean War, who later became a diplomat and politician in South Korea. Born in North Pyongan, he did his early schooling in China and Korea, and had a brief career as a teacher before his connections with the nascent Korean independence movement led to his imprisonment. He fled into exile in China in 1918, and served in the Kuomintang's National Revolutionary Army from 1926 to 1948, following which he moved to the newly independent South Korea to join the Republic of Korea Army. He commanded South Korea's I Corps during the first year of the Korean War, and was then sent to Taipei as South Korea's ambassador to the Republic of China, which by then had retreated to Taiwan. His assignment there ultimately lasted nine years. He returned to South Korea in 1960 following the April Revolution which ended the rule of Syngman Rhee, and served briefly as Minister of Foreign Affairs under the Park Chung Hee junta. He ran for the National Assembly, first unsuccessfully in 1960 and 1963, and was then elected in 1967 and became a major figure in the opposition New Democratic Party.

Being one of the most experienced and high-ranked among the officer corps that commanded the early Republic of Korea Army, he was nicknamed the "Five-star General".

== Early life and military career in China ==
Kim was born on 23 September 1898 in Ryongchon County, North Pyongan Province. At age 15, shortly after the beginning of Japanese rule over Korea, he went to Fengtian (today Liaoning), China to attend a primary school there. He returned to Korea and at the age of 18 entered the Osan School in Chongju. He later became an instructor at the Gyeongsin School (Note: 경신학교; 儆新學校; founded by Kim Ik-du in 1907. Not to be confused with the Gyeongsin School in Seoul which is a predecessor of Yonsei University. See 이한순 [Yi Han-sun] (1995). 신천군(信川郡) [Sinchŏn County]. Encyclopedia of Korean Culture. Academy of Korean Studies.) in Sinchon County, Hwanghae Province, but his involvement in agitation against Japanese rule as a member of the alumni association of the Osan School resulted in his imprisonment.

After his release, Kim fled into exile in China in 1918. There, he was able to enter the Guizhou Military Academy (Note: 貴州陸軍講武學校, the successor of the Guiyang Military Academy of the Qing Dynasty government) thanks to an introduction by Huang Jiemin. In China he used a variety of aliases, including the Korean name Choe Se-pyeong (최세평; 崔世平) and the Chinese names Wang Hsiung (王雄; Wáng Xióng), Wang Yi-shu (王逸曙; Wáng Yìshǔ), and Wang Fu-kao (王復高; Wáng Fùgāo). After his graduation in 1920 he proceeded to the Russian Far East to try to gain Russian support for the Korean independence movement, but faced numerous setbacks: first the fratricidal killings of the Free City Incident in 1921, and then the withdrawal of Russian support in 1922. As a result, he crossed back into Northeast China late that year. He remained there for a few years, and briefly returned to teaching to make a living, taking up a post at the Myeongdong School established by Kim Yak-yeon in the village of Mingdong (Myeongdong) in Helong County, Jilin. His alias Choe Se-pyeong itself embroiled him in a minor scandal in the village: it was rumoured he wanted to court a woman there whose surname was also Choe, but romance between individuals with the same surname was not encouraged in traditional Korean society, due to the possibility of violating the prohibition on marriage between people belonging to the same bongwan (clan). (Note: For further details about this custom and its later evolution in South Korean law, see Article 809 of the Korean Civil Code.) As a result, he revealed his real name to several people.

However, Japanese secret police were increasingly active in Northeast China hunting down Korean partisans, and for his own safety Kim left the region and went to Shanghai. In 1926, he joined the Republic of China's National Revolutionary Army. His second son Kim Young-jai (Note: 김용재; 金勇哉; reported to be age 72 in 1999.) was born around this time. He participated in the Northern Expedition, and was later stationed at Wusong Fort and then the Shanghai Arsenal. While assigned to the latter post, at the request of Kim Ku of the Provisional Government of the Republic of Korea, he provided Lee Bong-chang and Yun Bong-gil with the bombs used in 1932 in the Sakuradamon assassination attempt against Emperor Hirohito and the Hongkew Park attack on Japanese troops which killed General Yoshinori Shirakawa of the Shanghai Expeditionary Army. During the Shanghai War of 1932, he served as an intelligence officer with the 19th Route Army. In 1934, he was reassigned to the Luoyang branch of the Republic of China Military Academy, where he was in charge of a special course for Korean officer candidates in the ROC army.

During the Second Sino-Japanese War, Kim was promoted to the rank of major-general in 1939, and lieutenant general in May 1945. After the surrender of Japan, he continued to serve in the National Revolutionary Army for a few more years, and was assigned to the Northeast Security Command, in which capacity he organised the repatriation of Koreans from Northeast China to the Korean peninsula.

== In South Korea ==
=== Military career ===
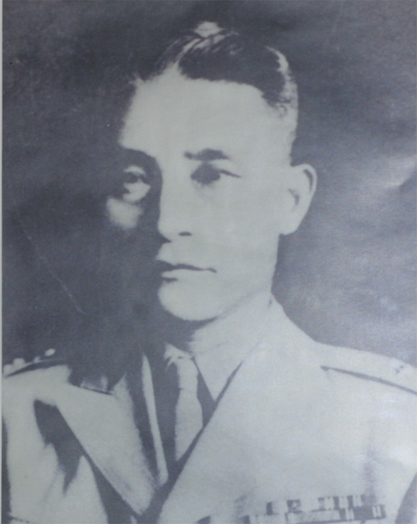
Official portrait of Kim in 1948 as principal of the Korea Military Academy

In August 1948, Kim moved to South Korea to join the newly formed Republic of Korea Army. He was assigned to be the principal of the Korea Military Academy. In 1949, he finished writing the Outline of National Defense, one of the earliest works of the new country's Ministry of National Defense regarding military strategy.

After the outbreak of the Korean War on 25 June 1950, Kim became the commander of the I Corps. During the First Battle of Seoul, the I Corps held a position at Kumchon, North Hwanghae, to the north of Uijeongbu. Once he learned of the North Koreans' 28 June capture of Seoul, Kim had his forces retreat to the south bank of the Han River and set up a defensive line, which they were able to hold for six days until 3 July when North Korea had recovered sufficiently from the demolition of the Hangang Bridge to begin sending tanks across the river. Historian Jongsuk Chay credited the time earned by this operation with "saving the Republic of Korea from communism". Kim went on to fight in the Battle of Pusan Perimeter later that year. However, his conflicts with President Syngman Rhee and American military officers led to his discharge in March 1951.

=== As a diplomat ===
Kim (centre) with Chiang Kai-shek (left) and Syngman Rhee (right) during the latter's state visit to Taipei in 1953

On 3 November 1951, Kim arrived in Taipei, Taiwan, to begin his service as ambassador to the Republic of China. He remained in the position until 13 June 1960. On the occasion of his departure, General Peng Meng-chi presented him with the Order of the Cloud and Banner in recognition of his wartime military service to the Republic of China, as well as the second rank of the civilian Order of Brilliant Star. Kim was one of a large number of high-level diplomatic personnel who resigned in the aftermath of the April Revolution, along with ambassador to the U.S. Yang You-chan and ambassador to Japan Yu Tae-ha. In the aftermath of Park Chung Hee's May 1961 coup, Kim served a brief term as Minister of Foreign Affairs from 21 May until his resignation on 21 July. He continued to play a role in foreign affairs after his resignation, and was dispatched to Niger in December 1961 as South Korea's representative to the celebrations for Niger's fourth Republic Day.

=== In politics ===
Kim made his first foray into electoral politics in the 1960 elections as a candidate for the Senate. He announced his intention to run when he resigned from his ambassadorial post. He ran as an independent in the Seoul electoral district, facing off against multiple Democratic Party and Liberal Party candidates. He came in seventh place behind George Paik (independent), Lee In (independent), Kim Dong-o (Democratic), Han Dong-suk (Democratic), Go Hui-dong (Democratic), and Jeon Yong-sun (Democratic). In December 1961, Kim was chosen as the ninth president of the Korean Veterans Association. In 1962, he was awarded the Independence Medal of the Order of Merit for National Foundation. Kim then ran again in the 1963 elections as one of six Korea Independence Party candidates. The party received 1.28% of all votes cast, and failed to secure any seats.

Kim's objections to the 1965 Treaty on Basic Relations between Japan and the Republic of Korea later led him into further conflict with the Park regime. While the treaty negotiations were ongoing, Kim co-authored a series of op-eds along with Association of Families of Patriotic Martyrs president Koo Sung-suh, (Note: 순국선열유족회장 구성서; 殉國先烈遺族會長 具聖書. Official website) former Minister of Justice Lee In, Christian philosopher Ham Seok-heon, former prime minister Byeon Yeong-tae, and linguist Kim Yun-gyeong, which were published on the front page of the Kyunghyang Shinmun in February 1965. After the signing of the treaty in June, Kim intensified his public activities in opposition to it. On 27 July, he became a founding member of the Citizens' Council for the Protection of the Fatherland, (Note: 조국수호국민협의회; 祖國守護國民協議會) which aimed to block ratification of the treaty. After he failed to achieve that goal, he issued a statement on behalf of the council calling for the National Assembly to be dissolved and a new general election to be held. Then on 27 August, Kim and ten other Republic of Korea Reserve Forces officers issued another statement calling on the Armed Forces to "maintain political neutrality" in the face of increasing public turmoil relating to the treaty. Two days later, Kim and three co-signers of that statement—former Minister of Defense Park Byung-kwon, former Korean Central Intelligence Agency director Kim Jae-chun, and former minister without portfolio Park Won-bin—were arrested and charged with criminal libel in relation to its contents, and were held at the Seoul Correctional Institute (the former Seodaemun Prison). Further charges of inciting rebellion were laid against the four on 7 September. Kim's three co-defendants were eventually released on ₩50,000 bail on 25 October, while Kim himself was released on the official ground of severe illness.

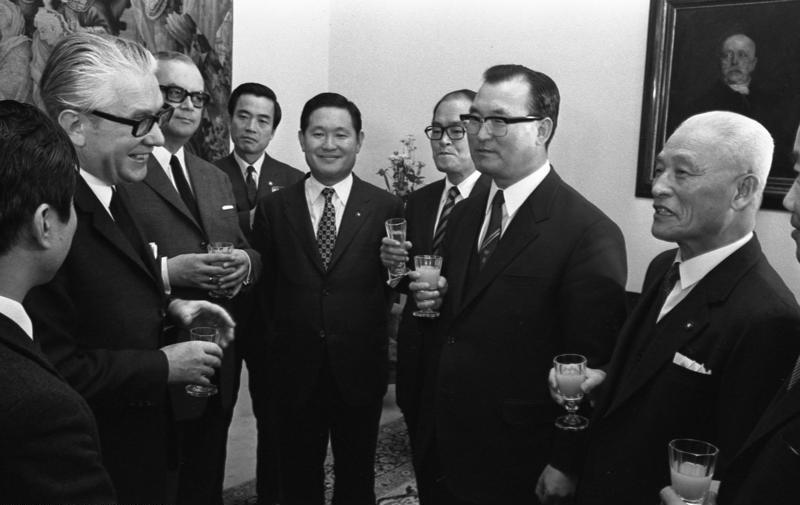
Kim (right) and other National Assembly members with President of the Bundestag Kai-Uwe von Hassel during a visit to West Germany in 1970

In 1967, Kim became a founding member of the opposition New Democratic Party, and was elected to represent Mapo District in the National Assembly in the elections that year. In 1969 he was one of the founders of the Pan-Citizens' Committee to Fight Against the Three-Term Constitutional Reform, created in opposition to the constitutional referendum that year which allowed Park to run for a third term as president. He played a larger role in the May 1971 legislative elections, running as an at-large representative and also becoming the acting head of the New Democratic Party following the resignation of Yu Chin-san two weeks before the election. He won his election, and also became the official chairman of the New Democratic Party in July following its all-party convention.

Throughout 1972, the New Democratic Party was riven by conflicts between Kim's faction, supported by party heavyweights Kim Dae-jung and Yang Il-dong, and the opposing pro-Yu Chin-san faction led by Chyung Yil-hyung. Matters came to a head at the party convention in September, held in the absence of Kim's faction, which resulted in the return of Yu Chin-san as party chairman. Kim's faction issued a statement denouncing the results and declaring the convention illegal, but the National Election Commission refused Kim's application for an injunction against the Yu Chin-san faction. The following month, Park Chung Hee carried out his October Restoration self-coup and dissolved the National Assembly, and then just a month before the February 1973 elections, Kim's faction broke off from the New Democratic Party and established the Democratic Unification Party. However, the Democratic Unification Party performed poorly, and only two of its candidates were elected, Kim not among them. Following the election, Democratic Unification Party leaders expressed regret for participating, and Kim pledged to dedicate the remainder of his life to fighting for the return of democracy. Later that year, he was one of thirty opposition politicians to sign a petition calling for constitutional reform and free elections, and in 1974 he became one of the founding members of the Citizens' Conference for the Restoration of Democracy.

== Retirement and death ==
In 1977 Kim was elected the sixth president of the Korea Liberation Association, an organisation for Korean independence activists and their families. He was re-elected as the seventh president in 1979.

Kim died at his home in Hyochang-dong, Yongsan District, Seoul on 8 August 1980. He was survived by his wife Min Gyeong-ran and three sons. Although a public funeral had been planned, in the end Kim's family decided to hold a private funeral at their home, followed by a procession to the Seoul National Cemetery where he was buried. Pastor Kyung-Chik Han of Young Nak Presbyterian Church, the church of which Kim had been a member, presided over the funeral. Roughly 1,500 people visited the family home to pay their respects, including Chun Doo-hwan, United States Forces Korea commander John A. Wickham Jr., and fellow independence activist Lee Kap-sung.

== Works ==
- 國防概論 [Outline of National Defense]. Seoul: 高麗書籍 [Goryeo Seojeok]. 1949. Archived from the original on 2020-03-24.
- 具聖書 [Koo Sung-suh]; 李仁 [Lee In]; 咸錫憲 [Ham Seok-heon]; 卞榮泰 [Byeon Yeong-tae]; 金弘壹 [Kim Hong-il]; 金允經 [Kim Yun-gyeong] (17–27 February 1965). 日本은 對答하라 [Japan Must Reply]. Kyunghyang Shinmun (in Korean).
  - 日本은 對答하라 (1) 号哭하는「넋」들 [Japan Must Reply (1): The Wailing Souls]. Kyunghyang Shinmun (in Korean). 17 February 1965. p. 1 – via Naver News Library.
  - 日本은 對答하라 (2) 百餘万의 怨鬼가 [Japan Must Reply (2): Millions of Angry Ghosts]. Kyunghyang Shinmun (in Korean). 18 February 1965. p. 1 – via Naver News Library.
  - 日本은 對答하라 (3) 平等한立場에서 [Japan Must Reply (3): From a Position of Equality]. Kyunghyang Shinmun (in Korean). 19 February 1965. p. 1 – via Naver News Library.
  - 日本은 對答하라 (4) 時代를 배워야 [Japan Must Reply (4): Learn from the Times]. Kyunghyang Shinmun (in Korean). 22 February 1965. p. 2 – via Naver News Library.
  - 日本은 對答하라 (5) 侵略根性버려야 [Japan Must Reply (5): Discard the Spirit of Invasion]. Kyunghyang Shinmun (in Korean). 24 February 1965. p. 2 – via Naver News Library.
  - 日本은 對答하라 (完) 反省의 자세를 [Japan Must Reply (end): A Posture of Reflection]. Kyunghyang Shinmun (in Korean). 27 February 1965. p. 2 – via Naver News Library.
- 大陸의 憤怒: 老兵의 回想記 [The Fury of a Continent: An Old Soldier's Memoirs]. 文潮社 [Munjosa]. 1972. OCLC 1020942455. Archived from the original on 2020-03-24 – via National Digital Library of Korea.
