= Laxmikhar =

Village in Maharashtra

Laxmikhar is a small village in the state of Maharashtra, India. It is located approximately 20 km from the town of Roha.
