= Jayshree Talwalkar =

Indian philosopher (born 1957)

Dhanashree Shreenivas Talwalkar
- Born: Jayshree Athavale; 12 July 1957 (age 69); India
- Known for: Spiritual leader, philosopher
- Spouse: Shreenivas Talwalkar
- Father: Pandurang Shastri Athavale

Dhanashree Talwalkar (née Jayshree Athavale) also known as Didiji (affectionately), which literally translates as elder sister in Hindi, is an Indian philosopher, spiritual leader, social reformer. She has represented Swadhyay and Indian philosophy at different conferences.

Dhanashree Talwalkar is the daughter and spiritual heir of Pandurang Shastri Athavale (Dadaji), a philosopher, social scientist, and founder of the Swadhyay (pronounced ‘swaadhyaay’) Parivar (meaning family). She is the leader of “Silent but Singing” Swadhyay movement. At the age of 20, she conducted the first “Geetatrayah” – a three-day overview of Bhagvad Geeta - reciting, translating and explaining applied philosophy of "Bhagvad Geeta - Divine Song of the Lord Krishna". Since then, she has conducted numerous Geetatrayah. She was awarded the Lokshikshak Award by Apte Guruji Smarak Trust. In 2002, she spoke at a symposium organized by the New York-based World Conference on Religion and Peace (WCRP), and was the only invitee to represent Hinduism to speak at the World Conference on Peace, organized by Pontifical Council for Inter-Religious Dialogue.

== Personal life ==
She was married to Shrinivas Talwalkar (Raosaheb) (died 18 January 2021).
