= Royaye Ma =

Single by Ebi and Shadmehr
- Released: 2013
- Genre: Pop
- Length: 3:20
- Label: Avang Music
- Songwriter: Yaghma Golrouee
- Producers: Buzzer Media; World Vision

Ebi singles chronology
"Navazesh" (2010)	"Royaye Ma" (2013)	"Ye Dokhtar" (2013)

Shadmehr singles chronology
"Entekhab" (2012)	"Royaye Ma" (2012)	"Ye Dokhtar" (2013)

Royaye Ma (Persian: رویای ما, A Dream), is a single by Iranian singers, Ebi and Shadmehr, released in 2012. In this single singers critic the governing idea of this world which is based on war and cruelness.

== Music video ==
The singers released the music video sponsored by Roshen confectionery. The video focuses on the children who are main victims of wars.

== Royaye Ma (Live Version) ==
"Royaye Ma (Live Version)"

Single by Shadmehr Aghili
- Released: April 11, 2023
- Genre: pop
- Length: 3:31

Shadmehr Aghili chronology
Hese Khobie (2023)	Royaye Ma (Live Version) (2023)

This version was performed live in Shadmehr Aghili's concert in support of the revolutionary uprising of 1401 and was released as a single on April 11, 2023.

== Global tour ==
Ebi and Shadmehr performed the song in different cities such as:

- Vancouver,
- London, HMV Forum
