= Lokmanya Tilak National Award =

Indian award

- Awarded for: To honour people who have worked for the nation’s progress and development.
- Location: Pune, Maharashtra
- Country: India
- Presented by: Tilak Smarak Mandir Trust
- First award: 1983
- Website: Lokmanya Tilak Awards

The Lokmanya Tilak National Award is a national-level award instituted to honour works in the field of nation development and progress. It is named after Indian nationalist leader and freedom fighter Bal Gangadhar Tilak, popularly known as Lokmanya. The award is presented annually on 1st August by the Tilak Smarak Mandir Trust on the occasion of Lokmanya Tilak's death anniversary. Lokmanya Tilak was a prominent figure in India's freedom struggle during the early 20th century.

== Award ==
The award constitutes a memento, citation and the amount of ₹100,000.

== List of recipients ==
Year	Recipient	Ref.
1983	Shreedhar Mahadev Joshi	
1984	Godavari Parulekar	
1985	Indira Gandhi (posthumous)	
1986	Shripad Amrit Dange	
1987	Achyut Patwardhan	
1988	Abdul Ghaffar Khan (posthumous)	
1989	Sudha Joshi	
1990	Madhu Limaye	
1991	Madhukar Dattatraya Deoras	
1992	Pandurang Shastri Athavale	
1993	Shankar Dayal Sharma	
1994	Atal Bihari Vajpayee	
1995	T. N. Seshan	
1996	Ramchandra Narayan Dandekar	
1997	Manmohan Singh	
1998	Rajagopala Chidambaram	
1999	Vijay P. Bhatkar	
2000	Rahul Bajaj	
2001	M. S. Swaminathan	
2002	Verghese Kurien	
2003	Ramoji Rao	
2004	N. R. Narayana Murthy	
2005	Sam Pitroda	
2006	G. Madhavan Nair	
2007	A. Sivathanu Pillai	
2008	Montek Singh Ahluwalia	
2009	Pranab Mukherjee	
2010	Sheila Dikshit	
2011	Kota Harinarayana	
2012	Prakash Amte and Vikas Amte	
2013	E. Sreedharan	
2014	Avinash Chander	
2015	Subbiah Arunan	
2016	Sharad Pawar	
2017	Balkrishna	
2018	K. Sivan	
2019	Baba Kalyani	
2020	Sonam Wangchuk	
2021	Cyrus S. Poonawalla	
2022	Tessy Thomas	
2023	Narendra Modi	
2024	Sudha Murty	
2025	Nitin Gadkari	
2026	Ajit Doval	

== Trivia ==
- Indira Gandhi and Abdul Ghaffar Khan only two are (posthumous) awarded
- N. R. Narayana Murthy and Sudha Murty are the only couple to be awarded.
