= IWE =

IWE may refer to:

- International Worship in English, a Christian ministry of American missionary to South Korea, Bill Majors
- International Wrestling Enterprise, a Japanese professional wrestling promotion active from 1966 to 1981
- "IWE", a single by Noisettes from the album What's the Time Mr Wolf?
- International Welding Engineer
