= Antarnaad =

Antarnaad अंतर्नाद
- Release poster
- Directed by: Shyam Benegal
- Written by: Shama Zaidi; Sunil Shanbag
- Produced by: Suhetu Films
- Starring: Kulbhushan Kharbanda; Girish Karnad; Shabana Azmi; Om Puri
- Music by: Vanraj Bhatia
- Release date: 1991
- Running time: 160 minutes
- Language: Hindi

Antarnaad (Hindi: अंतरनाद) ("Inner voice") was a 1991 Hindi film made by Shyam Benegal, based on the Swadhyay Movement by Pandurang Shastri Athavale.

== Cast ==
- Shabana Azmi
- Kulbhushan Kharbanda
- Shobha Khote
- Om Puri
- Girish Karnad
- Dina Pathak
- Pawan Malhotra
- Rupal Patel
- Ravi Jhankal
