= International Worship in English =

Coordinates: 37.563243°N 126.989062°E

IWE 10am Worship Service

IWE 3:30pm NEXUS Worship Service

International Worship in English (IWE - pronounced "I" "WE") is a Christian ministry of Youngnak Presbyterian Church in Myeongdong Seoul, South Korea that in English offers traditional worship at 10am and contemporary worship at 3:30pm on Sundays. English worship in two different styles, small group Bible studies, counseling, fellowship, and retreats are provided for the international community in the greater Seoul area. The ministry is like a church (mega-church or KM) within a church (international church or EM). It was founded on Easter in 1998 by a volunteer pastor, Bill Majors, who, for his efforts, was made an Honorary Citizen of Seoul (2005). Youngnak Presbyterian Church was founded by Rev. Kyung-Chik Han, winner of the 1992 Templeton Prize, in 1945. Rev. Han, who died in 2000, lived to see the foundation of an English-language ministry at his church. Youngnak Presbyterian Church's IWE has a website which is updated weekly, listed below in the external links section. In 2012, Bill Majors ended his ministry at Youngnak IWE. Thereafter, pastor Paul Song, pastor Christine Han (interim), and pastor Issac Chang have served as the Lead Pastor position. Currently pastor Justin Yoon Ki Kim is leading the congregation. English services in Korean churches are popular, with almost all the large churches having a service in English. They are to be a "home away from home" for those who come to Korea from abroad. IWE worship services are open to be attended both by people who do not speak Korean (people from abroad) and by Koreans who attend for many reasons.

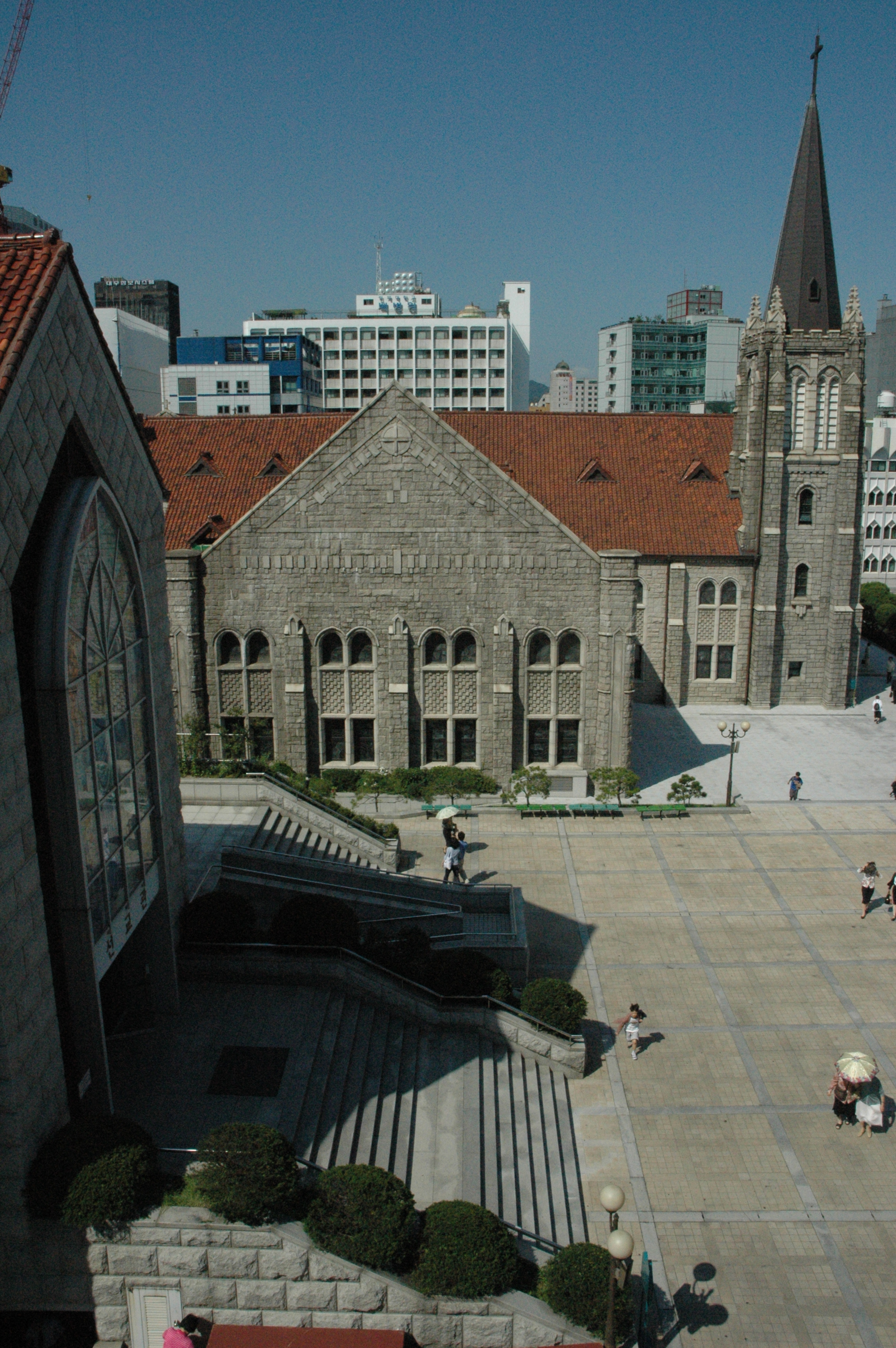
Young Nak Presbyterian Church
