= Global Emergency Response Coalition =

The Global Emergency Response Coalition is a lifesaving humanitarian alliance made up of eight of the world's largest U.S.-based international aid organizations whose ultimate vision is to solve for the emergency, humanitarian situations more effectively and to respond to the crisis of the present and the future.

The Coalition was formed in 2017 in response to hunger crises affecting more than 20 million people in Nigeria, Yemen, South Sudan, Somalia and neighboring countries.

The Global Emergency Response Coalition consists of CARE, International Medical Corps, International Rescue Committee, Mercy Corps, Oxfam, Plan International, Save the Children and World Vision. The Coalition aims to work collectively to deliver relief to millions of children and families in need and to broaden awareness of international disasters in order to inspire new donors and donations, to ultimately save more lives.

== Publicity ==
The coalition has been covered by ABC News., CNN, The Washington Post, Devex, PBS, Glamour, FOX, and more.

George Clooney participated in a PSA for the coalition, as did Lily Donaldson

== Member Organizations ==
- CARE
- International Medical Corps
- International Rescue Committee
- Mercy Corps
- Oxfam
- Plan International
- Save the Children
- World Vision

== Fundraising and Partners ==
All funds raised by the coalition are allocated to the member agencies equally, and at the discretion of each member. At least 85% of all donations will go directly to support the communities affected.

Corporate partners of the coalition include BlackRock, PepsiCo., PepsiCo. Foundation, Visa, Google, PMX Agency, Porter Novelli and Twitter.

== Background ==
Today, the need for humanitarian aid continues to expand. The UN estimates that one out of every 70 people around the world is caught up in a crisis. Natural disasters affect around 350 million people each year; more than 68 million were displaced by conflict in 2017. Humanitarian crises are also lasting longer — now an average of nine years. In a humanitarian system where funding is strained, creative and collective solutions are needed. By raising funds and attention for these large-scale emergencies together, we believe we can be part of the solution to help the increasing number of people in need.
