= World Vision International =

American Christian humanitarian organization

Coordinates: 34°08′32″N 118°01′02″W

- Founded: 1950; 76 years ago
- Founder: Robert Pierce and Kyung-Chik Han
- Type: Religious nonprofit organization
- Tax ID no.: 95-3202116
- Legal status: 501(c)(3)
- Purpose: Our vision for every child, life in all its fullness; our prayer for every heart, the will to make it so.
- Locations: Monrovia, California, U.S. (administrative center, World Vision International board); London, U.K. (executive office and international headquarters)
- Region served: 100 countries
- Method: Transformational Development through emergency relief, community development and policy and advocacy
- President, Chief Executive Officer: Andrew Morley
- Board Chair, Australia: Donna Shepherd
- Board Chair, Colombia: Maria Consuelo Campos
- Board Chair, Mali: Soriba Joseph Camara
- Revenue: US$3.12 billion (2025)
- Expenses: US$2.4 billion (2025)
- Endowment: US$13.8 million (2025)
- Employees: 31,000 (2025)
- Website: wvi.org
- Formerly called: World Vision Inc.

World Vision International is an interdenominational Christian humanitarian aid, development, and advocacy organization. It was founded in 1950 by Robert Pierce and Kyung-Chik Han as a service organization to provide care for children in Korea. In 1975, emergency and advocacy work was added to World Vision's objectives. It is active in over 100 countries with a total revenue including grants, product and foreign donations of US$3.14 billion.

== History ==
The charity was founded in 1950 as World Vision Inc. by Robert Pierce and Kyung-Chik Han. It was founded after Pierce was invited to Korea by Han to speak at Young Nak Church, followed by another speech in Seoul. After the breakout of the Korean War weeks later, Pierce and Han continued to collaborate on relief efforts in the region. The first World Vision office opened later that year in Portland, Oregon, with a second office following in 1954 in Korea. During the early years, the charity operated as a missionary service organization meeting emergency needs in crisis areas in East Asia. World Vision operated as a missionary service organisation meeting emergency needs of children in crisis areas in East Asia following the Korean War.

In 1967, the Mission Advanced Research and Communication Center (MARC) was founded by Ed Dayton as a division of World Vision. It became the organizational backbone of the Lausanne Committee for World Evangelization, collected and published data about "unreached people" and also published the "Mission Handbook: North American Protestant Ministries Overseas".

During the 1970s, World Vision began training families in the agricultural skills necessary to build small farms, with the aim of promoting long term improvement and self-reliance in the communities. The organization also began installing water pumps for clean water, which caused infant mortality rates to drop. Volunteers now use the fresh water to teach gardening and irrigation and promote good health.

In order to restructure, the organization World Vision International was founded in 1977 by Walter Stanley Mooneyham the then president of World Vision. In 1979, World Vision also co-founded the Evangelical Council for Financial Accountability with the Billy Graham Evangelistic Association.

During the 1990s, World Vision International began focusing on the needs of children who had been orphaned in Uganda, Romania, and Somalia in response to AIDS, neglect, and civil war, respectively. World Vision began working with communities, health providers, faith-based organisations and people living with HIV and AIDS to encourage an end to stigmatisation, better understanding of HIV prevention and community care for those living with AIDS, and orphans left behind by the pandemic. They also joined the United Nations peacekeeping efforts to help those affected by civil war. World Vision also started to openly promote the international ban on land mines. In 1994 World Vision US moved to Washington State. In 2004, the political weekly Tehelka newspaper in India criticised World Vision India for its involvement with AD2000.

In 2022, WVI operated in more than 100 countries and had over 31,000 employees.

== Organizational structure ==
The World Vision Partnership operates as a federation of interdependent national offices governed by a commitment to common standards and values on fundamental issues. World Vision International provides the global oversight and sets global standards, and is the operating entity in some countries. In other countries, World Vision operates through a locally incorporated NGO, with a local board of directors. Most of the workforce in each country are citizens of that given territory. World Vision International’s board of directors oversees the World Vision partnership. The full board meets twice a year to appoint senior officers, approve strategic plans and budgets, and determine international policy. The current chairperson of the international board is Ivan Satyavrata. The international president is Andrew Morley. From 2021 onwards, Morley served as Chair of the Steering Committee for Humanitarian Response (SCHR), and is a member of the Inter-Agency Standing Committee (IASC).

=== Partners ===
World Vision partners include governments, civil society organisations, faith communities, faith-based organisations, businesses, academia, and others. The organization has thousands of partners located around the world.

Some of those who work with World Vision globally include the European Union, Unicef, Global Partnership to End Violence, Joining Forces, World Bank, World Health Organization, World Food Programme, Inter Agency Standing Committee, International Food Policy Research Institute, and Joining Forces for Last Mile Nutrition.

== Beliefs ==
World Vision's staff comes from a range of Christian denominations. Its staff includes followers of Protestantism, Catholicism and Eastern Orthodoxy. Around the world its staff includes followers of different religions or none. Some staff participate in religious services provided by WVI. They stress that one can be a Christian in any culture. However, World Vision also respects other religions that it encounters, stating that "to promote a secular approach to life would be an insult to them". Richard Stearns, president of World Vision US, stated that World Vision has a strict policy against proselytizing, which he describes as "using any kind of coercion or inducement to listen to a religious message before helping someone".

The World Vision Partnership and all of its national members are committed to the concept of transformational development, which is cast in a biblical framework and which is seen as a witness to the love of God for all humanity.

== Programs ==
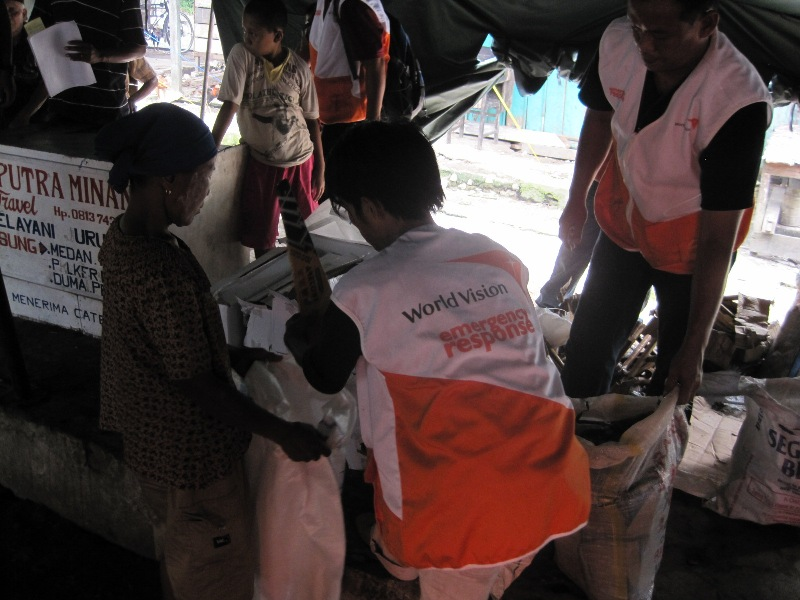
WV relief effort in disaster affected areas in Indonesia

Activities include: emergency relief, education, health care, economic development, advocacy, water/sanitation, food distribution and promotion of justice. The organization has consultative status with the United Nations Economic and Social Council and partnerships with UN agencies like UNICEF, WHO, UNHCR and ILO.

It also addresses factors that perpetuate poverty by what it describes as promoting justice. It supports community awareness of the collective ability to address unjust practices and begin working for change. It claims to speak out on issues such as child labor, debt relief for poor nations, and the use of children as combatants in armed conflict. World Vision International has endorsed the Universal Declaration of Human Rights and the United Nations Convention on the Rights of the Child. It claims to foster opportunities to help reduce conflict levels and to contribute to the peaceful resolution of hostilities and reconciliation of disputes.

World Vision encourages public awareness about the needs of others, the causes of poverty, and the nature of compassionate response. These efforts include collaboration with media and community participation in fundraising. In areas of the world that are considered too dangerous for news organizations to send their crews, World Vision's own videographers supply newscasters with footage of events from these areas. In its communications, the organization claims to uphold the dignity of children and families in presenting explanations of the causes and consequences of poverty, neglect, abuse and war.

World Vision operates in Rwanda since 1994, following the 1994 Genocide against the Tutsi. In 2023, through 24 programs it helps 1.9 million people all over the country. Between 2010 and 2017, World Vision Rwanda was averaging nearly US$35 million budget annually, said George Gitau, former country director.

In 2015, World Vision took part in operations to bring earthquake relief to Nepal. It was also involved in running a child sponsorship program bringing aid to needy children in the wake of the Ebola outbreak in West Africa.

== Criticism ==
After his resignation from the post of president, its founder Robert Pierce criticized the organization for its professionalization at the expense of its evangelical faith and founded Samaritan's Purse in 1970.

=== Accusations of misrepresentation ===
Some donors to World Vision's Sponsor a Child-type fundraising have reported feeling misled by the group's use of such funding for community rather than individual-specific projects. In a 2008 report on famine in Ethiopia, reporter Andrew Geoghegan, from Australian TV programme Foreign Correspondent, visited his 14-year-old sponsor child. The girl has "been part of a World Vision program all her life" yet says (in translated subtitle) "Until recently, I didn't know I had a sponsor." And when asked about her knowledge of World Vision sponsorship says, "Last time they gave me this jacket and a pen." Geoghegan was disconcerted to find that despite being "told by World Vision that [the girl] was learning English at school, and was improving ... she speaks no English at all".

In response, World Vision stated that "it unapologetically takes a community-based approach to development", in which the money is not directly provided to the family of the sponsored child. The organization argued that the "direct benefit" approach would result in jealousy among other community members without children and would not work. Foreign Correspondent replied to World Vision concerning child sponsorship, showing contradictions between the organization's literature that creates the impression that donated money goes directly to the sponsor child and evidence of cases where supposedly sponsored children received little if any benefit.

=== Israel and Palestine ===
In 1982, after World Vision publicly criticized Israel's actions in Palestinian refugee camps near Sidon and Tyre, it came under attack from conservative evangelicals and the government of Israel. In spite of this pressure, World Vision president Mooneyham presented to the eight hundred thousand readers of World Vision Magazine a report "showing 255 bodies and ankle-deep body fluids left in a school basement by an Israeli bomb." In the September 1982 issue of World Vision Magazine President Stanley Mooneyham was quoted describing Israeli actions with the behavior of Hitler's army, "reminiscent of Warsaw". In the same month Mooneyham was forced to resign when, according to former World Vision employee Ken Waters, his leadership style was criticized; he was replaced as president by Ted Engstrom.

On June 15, 2016, Mohammad El Halabi, manager of World Vision in Gaza, was arrested at the Erez border crossing and charged by Israeli prosecutors with channeling funds to Hamas. Halabi's lawyer said his client had nothing to do with Hamas and that the fact that the investigation had lasted 55 days proved that there was a problem with evidence. The charity stood by Halabi, stating that he was a humanitarian.

== Notable affiliated persons ==
- Hugh Jackman – Australian actor and singer (born 1968)
- Kris Allen
- Paul Brandt
- Richard Stearns
- Liam Cunningham
- Richard C. Halverson (former chairman and former trustee)
- Paul Osteen
- Meghan Markle
- Joyce Napuat (Development facilitator)

== See also ==
- Hope International
- International Christian Fellowship
- Fellowship Foundation
- Steering Committee for Humanitarian Response
- Lausanne Committee for World Evangelization
- Evangelical Council for Financial Accountability
