= Richard Stearns (World Vision) =

President of World Vision United States (1998–2018)

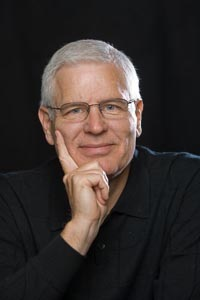
- Born: Richard Stearns; Syracuse, New York
- Spouse: Renee Stearns
- Children: 5

Richard Stearns was the president of World Vision United States, an international Christian relief charity based in Federal Way, Washington, from 1998 to 2018.

== Biography ==
Stearns holds a bachelor's degree from Cornell University, where he joined the Phi Kappa Psi fraternity and studied neurobiology, and an MBA from the Wharton School at the University of Pennsylvania. His professional career began in marketing with the Gillette Company in Boston. From 1977 to 1985, he held various roles with Parker Brothers, culminating in his appointment as president in 1984. In 1985, he became a vice president at The Franklin Mint, then joined Lenox in 1987 as president of Lenox Collections. In 1995, Stearns was named president and chief executive officer of Lenox, Inc., overseeing three divisions, six manufacturing facilities, 4,000 employees, and $500 million in annual sales. He left Lenox when in June 1998 he became president of World Vision.

As president of World Vision Inc., Stearns was responsible for U.S. operations, which included advocacy, fundraising, and program development, and prioritized the organization's worldwide attention on the AIDS crisis.

== Career ==
Stearns’ professional career began in marketing with the Gillette Company in Boston. From 1977 to 1985, he held various roles with Parker Brothers, culminating in his appointment as president in 1984. In 1985, he became a vice president at The Franklin Mint.He joined Lenox in 1987 as president of Lenox Collections, and was named president and CEO of Lenox, Inc. in 1995, overseeing three divisions, six manufacturing facilities, 4,000 employees, and $500 million in annual sales.

In June 1998 Stearns left Lenox to become president of the not-for-profit international relief agency World Vision U.S., based in Federal Way, Washington. As president of World Vision, Stearns was responsible for U.S. operations, which included advocacy, fundraising, and program development, and he prioritized the organization's worldwide attention on the AIDS crisis.

During his presidency, the organization’s annual revenue grew to over $1 billion as it expanded its work to serve even more children around the world.

Stearns led World Vision from 1998 to 2018, when he retired. He currently serves as the President Emeritus.

== Perspectives ==
Among Stearns’ largest contributions was his call to the church in America to respond to the global AIDS crisis in the early 2000s and the widespread influence of his first book, The Hole in Our Gospel, winner of the Evangelical Publisher’s Association 2010 Book of the Year award. Toward the end of his tenure, Stearns called the church to engage in the global refugee crisis and he taught to follow Jesus into the most difficult places in the world, helping alleviate human suffering and care for the world’s most vulnerable.

In 2014, World Vision U.S. announced that it would hire Christians in same-sex marriages. Facing protests from donors and the larger evangelical community after the announcement, World Vision reversed the policy change two days later.

== Publications ==
Stearns has written op-eds on global poverty and AIDS for major U.S. newspapers and magazines and has appeared on CNN, Fox, ABC, NBC, and PBS.Examples include his op-eds “Evangelicals and the Case for Foreign Aid” in The Wall Street Journal and “The Face of America Should Meet the Face of Poverty” in the Seattle Times.

In 2009, Stearns published his bestselling book The Hole in Our Gospel. Encouraging Christians to love their neighbors, the book examines how worldwide poverty is handled and how it must be changed. Stearns challenges individuals to reach out by using their time, talent, and money. It was named the 2010 Christian Book of the Year.

Stearns published the book Lead Like it Matters to God with InterVarsity Press in March 2021. In this book, Stearns says, among other things, that "success is overrated," and describes 17 "crucial values that can transform leaders and their organizations."
