= Joyce Napuat =

Ni-Vanuatu advocate

Joyce Napuat is an advocate for people with disabilities from Vanuatu. She is a development facilitator for World Vision Vanuatu, works for Oxfam, and is a member of the Vanuatu Disabled People's Society and Vanuatu Disability Network. In her previous work for World Vision, as a community coordinator, she promoted early identification of and intervention for children with disability.

Napuat attended the Vanuatu Institute of Technology, where she studied business management. In 2014 she won the Andy Lynch Award for Excellence in the Community Sector for her work in disability support.
