= Faculty of Management Studies – Institute of Rural Management, Jaipur =

Indian business school

Faculty of Management Studies - Institute of Rural management (FMS-IRM)
- Motto: Where Excellence is the Watch Word
- Founder: Dr. Thomas Cangan
- Established: 1994
- Focus: PGDM, PGDM-RM
- President: Prof. Barbara Cangan
- Faculty: 40+
- Key people: Prof. Elwin Thomas, (Managing Director) Dr. Stany Thomas Cangan, (CEO) Dr. Jessy John, (Director (education))
- Formerly called: Indian Institute of Rural Management
- Address: Sector – 11, Tagore Path, Agarwal Farm Mansarovar, Jaipur, Rajasthan 302020
- Location: Jaipur, Rajasthan, India
- Coordinates: 26.844738°N 75.772798°E
- Interactive map of Faculty of Management Studies - Institute of Rural management (FMS-IRM)
- Website: www.iirm.ac.in

Faculty of Management Studies - Institute of Rural Management (FMS-IRM) is an educational offshoot of SIIRM. It has campuses in Jaipur, Jodhpur and Phagi in Rajasthan. It is affiliated to AICTE, Ministry of Human Resource Development, and Government of India. Operational since 1994, it offers courses related to management and developmental research. It was formerly known as Indian Institute of Rural Management (IIRM).

The institute assists government organizations and corporate houses with their developmental initiatives pertaining to society and the economy. It has participated in research and consultancy projects initiated by the Indian Central and State Governments, organizations like NAEB, NLM, NHM and International organizations such as UNICEF, United Nations Population Fund, World Health Organization, World Bank, World Food Programme and Oxfam USA.

== Programs offered ==
FMS-IRM courses require two years, divided into four semesters. During this time, about 30 theoretical courses in various streams are covered. The industrial internship program is 45 days. IRM currently offers:

=== Post Graduate Diploma in Management (PGDM) ===
This program business management training in various streams, such as marketing, finance, human resource management, to train students in economic, technological, cultural and political spheres. The curriculum includes relevant market trends and caters to corporate requirements.

=== Post Graduate Diploma in Management - Rural Management (PGDM-RM) ===
The school offers a Post Graduate Diploma in Rural Management. Candidates in this program can opt for dual specialization in agribusiness and rural banking and finance.

== Collaborations - national and international ==
FMS-IRM offers add-on courses and certification programs through various national and international collaborations. They include:

- National Institute of Securities Markets
- ICDL
- Association of Indian Management Schools (AIMS)
- National Securities Depository Limited (NSDL)

== Affiliations and rankings ==
  - Recognized by the National Board of Accreditation
  - Ranked among Best B-Schools of India by Business India Magazine
  - Ranked among Best Private B-Schools of India (North-Zone) by The Week (Indian magazine)
  - Ranked among Top Sectoral Colleges of India by Competition Success Review
  - Ranked among Best B-Schools in Rajasthan – Careers-360
  - Ranked among Top 100 B-Schools of India by India Today

== Dr Thomas Cangan Leadership Award ==
In the year 2012, FMS-IRM instituted Dr Thomas Cangan Leadership award to acknowledge alumni for making significant contribution to society. Among the recipients of this award, the most recent is Dr. Rajendra Singh, a Nobel Laureate, in 2019 while the first was Shri Anil Agarwal (industrialist), Chairman of Vedanta Group, in 2013.

Other noteworthy recipients include Dr Tessy Thomas in 2018, Professor Upinder Dhar in 2014, and Mrs. Neeta Boochra, former President of FICCI in 2015.

== International Internship Program ==
FMS-IRM added an additional component in the curriculum in 2011 named International Internship Program. Interested candidates can use this option to undertake internship with organizations in other countries after completing the first two semesters. FMS-IRM collaborates with AIESEC, an international students' organization which is active in more than 116 countries, to carry out this program. Through IIP students from foreign universities can attend FMS-IRM as interns, and likewise students of FMS-IRM can choose off-shore organizations for their summer internship.
