= Francis Kaboneka =

Rwandan public administrator and politician

- Born: Rwanda
- Citizenship: Rwanda
- Education: National University of Rwanda (Bachelor of Public Administration); Irish American University (Master of International Relations)
- Occupations: Politician, public administrator
- Years active: 2003 — present
- Known for: Public service
- Title: Cabinet Minister of Local Government in the Rwandan Cabinet

Francis Kaboneka, is a Rwandan public administrator and politician. He is the Cabinet Minister of Local Government in the Rwandan cabinet. He has served in that role, since 24 July 2014. In the cabinet reshuffle of 31 August 2017, he was retained in cabinet and he retained his portfolio.

== Background and education ==
He was born in Rwanda and attended local schools for his pre-university education. He holds a Bachelor of Public Administration obtained from the National University of Rwanda. His Master of International Relations was awarded by the Irish American University in Dublin, Ireland.

== Career ==
In 2003, he served as the executive secretary of National Youth Council. For a period of eleven years, from 2003 until 2014, he was a member of parliament. While in parliament, from 2003 until 2008, he served on the Agriculture and Environment Standing Committee, and from 2008 until 2014, he was a member of the Foreign Affairs, Cooperation and Security Standing Committee.

In his capacity as the minister of local government, Francis Kaboneka encourages local leaders to focus on the needs of ordinary people by listening and attending to their needs. He promotes national unity by urging Rwandans to focus on what they share in common and downplay their differences.

He is deputized by a minister of state for local government, currently Alvera Mukabaramba.

== See also ==
- Cabinet of Rwanda
- Parliament of Rwanda
