= Pandurang Shastri Athavale =

Indian spiritual leader and activist

- Born: 19 October 1920; Roha, Bombay Presidency, British India
- Died: 25 October 2003 (aged 83); Mumbai, Maharashtra, India
- Other name: Dadaji
- Known for: Swadhyaya Parivar, activist philosopher, spiritual teacher, spiritual leader
- Spouse: Nirmala Tai Athavale
- Children: Jayshree Talwalkar (Dhanashree Shreenivas Talwalkar)
- Awards: 1999 Padma Vibhushan; 1997 Templeton Prize; 1996 Ramon Magsaysay Award; 1996 Indira Gandhi Award for National Integration; 1992 Lokmanya Tilak National Award; 1986 Vision of God

Pandurang Shastri Athavale (19 October 1920 – 25 October 2003), also known as Dada /Dadaji ("elder brother" in marathi), was an Indian activist, philosopher, spiritual leader, social revolutionary, and religion reformist, who founded the Swadhyaya Parivar (Swadhyaya family) in 1954. Swadhyaya is a self-study process based on the Bhagavad Gita which has spread across nearly 100,000 villages in India, Americas, Europe, the Middle East, Oceania and other Asian countries with five million adherents. Noted for his discourses on the Bhagavad Gita, the Vedas and the Upanishads.

== Early life ==
Pandurang Shastri Athavale was born on 19 of October 1920 in a Chitpavan Brahmin Family in the village of Roha in Maharashtra (Konkan), India. He was one of five children born to the Sanskrit teacher Vaijanath Shastri Athavale and his wife Parvati Athavale.

When Athavale was twelve years old, his father set up an independent course of study for the young boy. Thus, Athavale was taught in a system very similar to that of the Tapovan system of ancient India. In 1942, he started to give discourses at the Srimad Bhagavad Gita Pathshala, Madhavbaug, Mumbai, a center set up by his father in 1926.

Athavale read diligently in the Royal Asiatic Library for a period of 14 years; at a young age, he was well known to have read every piece of non-fiction literature (ranging from Marx's philosophy to Whitehead's writings to ancient Indian philosophy). In 1954, he attended the Second World Philosophers' Conference, held in Japan. There, Athavale presented the concepts of Vedic ideals and the teachings of the Bhagavad Gita. Many participants were impressed by his ideas, but wanted evidence of such ideals being put into practice in India. Nobel Prize–winning physicist Dr. Arthur Holly Compton was particularly enchanted with Athavale's ideas and offered him a lucrative opportunity in the United States, where he could spread his ideas. Athavale politely declined, saying that he had much to accomplish in his native India, where he planned to demonstrate to the world a model community peacefully practising and spreading Vedic thought and the message of the Bhagavad Gita.

== Swadhyaya Parivar ==
The philosophy of original Vedic Dharma is the base of this movement. Swadhyaya Parivar established itself in India in 1978 with adherents meeting every Sunday, where prayers are sung and a video recording of Athavale teaching about the Vedic dharma is played. Swadhyaya, which closely translates to "study of the self" is a process based upon Vedic philosophy, and the members of the Parivar are called "Swadhyayees". Over the years, Athavale's followers have taken the Bhagavad Gita's concepts of Indwelling God and God's universal love to millions of people, transcending caste, socioeconomic barriers, and religious differences. Athavale personally visited tens of thousands of villages (on foot and rented bicycles), and his brothers and sisters (Swadhyayees) personally go house to house to establish selfless relationships with families and spread the Gita's teachers. Adherents have followed suit to roughly 100,000 villages across India, and at least 34 nations across the globe. In these villages, Athavale started various experiments (Prayogs) to impart social activism by means of a god-centric devotion, including cooperative farming, fishing and tree-planting projects in the spirit of collective, divine labour (Bhakti), somewhat similar to the Antigonish Movement in Canada. Swadhyayees aim to fulfill Athavale's vision of eradicating the world's problems by creating a global family united under the principle of a universal blood maker. He felt that the universality of the Bhagavad Gita allows for it to a guide to all of humanity. As such, its thoughts should reach unto the last person. Today, the millions of adherents can be found on every habitable continent in over 35 countries including the Caribbean, Americas, Asia, Europe, Australia, New Zealand, Middle East and Africa. It is the Swadhyaya Parivar's mission to complete Rev. Athavale's vision of a "Universal Brotherhood under the Divine Fatherhood of God."

== Death ==
Dadaji died at the age of 83 of cardiac arrest on 25 October 2003, in Mumbai, India. He was cremated on the evening of 26 October at Tattvagyan Vidyapeeth in the Thane district, where hundreds of thousands of mourners had paid their respects to him over a period of 24 hours. Subsequently, his ashes were immersed at Ujjain, Pushkar, Haridwar, Kurukshetra, Gaya, Jagannath Puri, and lastly at Rameshwaram.

== Popular culture ==
In 1991, Shyam Benegal created and directed the film Antarnaad (The Inner Voice), based on Athavale's Swadhyaya Movement or Prayogs, starring Shabana Azmi and Kulbhushan Kharbanda, among others. In 2004, Abir Bazaz directed the documentary Swadhyaya, based on the life and works of Athavale.

== Works ==
There are multiple books based on Dadaji's discourses (Pravachans) based on Vedic Stotras, the Geeta, and the Ramayana. His well-known books include Valmiki Ramayan, Geeta Amrutam, Homage to Saints, Prarthana Preeti, Tulsidal, Sanskruti Pujan (describing the appropriate definitions of culture and dharma), Vijigishu Jivanvad, The Systems: The Way and the Work (Swadhyaya: The Unique Philosophy of Life) and many more.

== Awards and prizes ==
He was awarded the Templeton Prize for Progress in Religion in 1997 and the Ramon Magsaysay Award in 1996 for Community Leadership, along with India's second-highest civilian honour, the Padma Vibhushan Award, in 1999. He also won the Rashtrabhusan award given to him by the FIE Foundation for Progress in Religion.

== See Also ==
- Swadhyaya Movement
