= Templeton Prize =

International award for affirming life's spiritual dimension

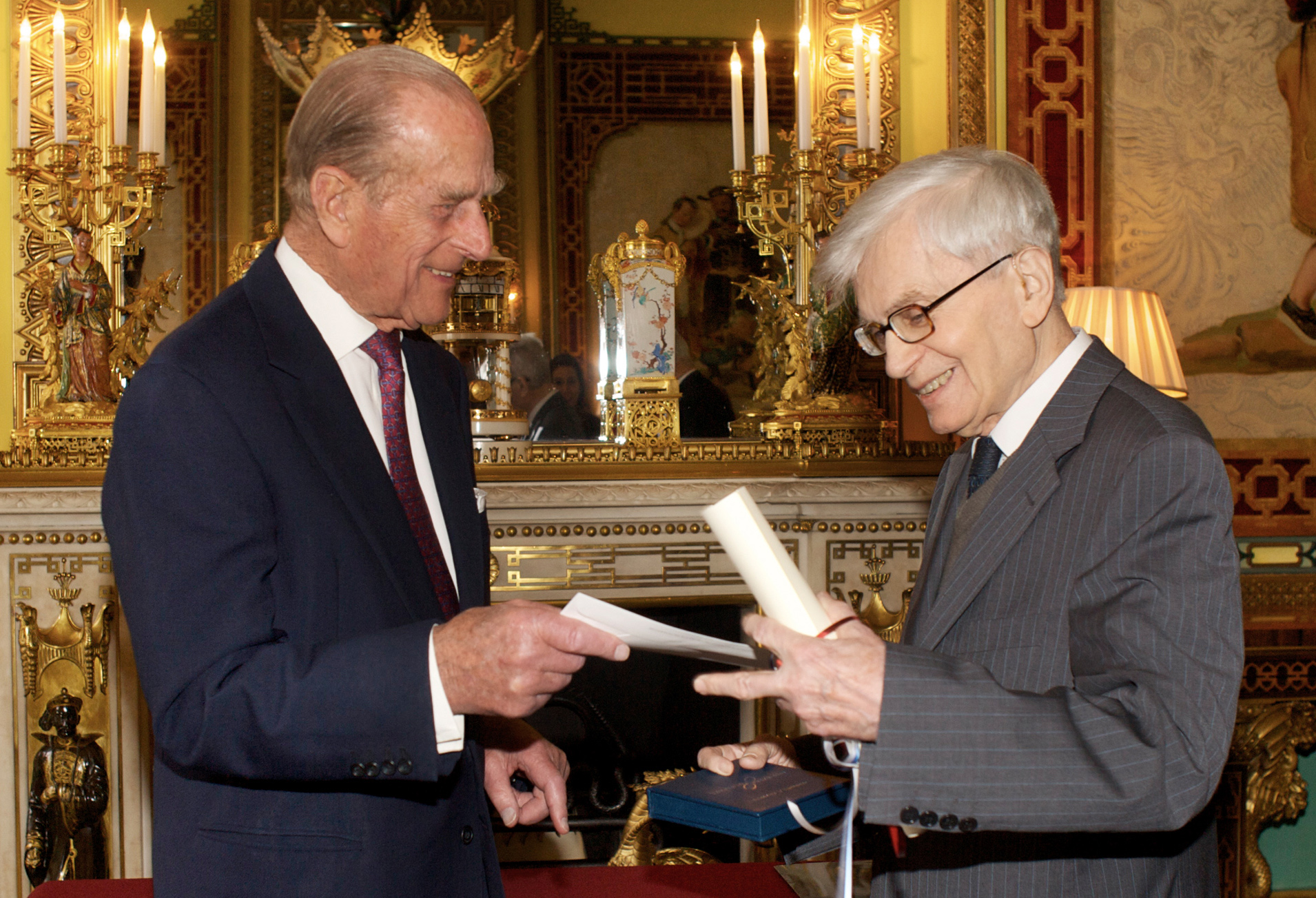
- Bernard d'Espagnat receiving the Templeton Prize from the Duke of Edinburgh in 2009
- Awarded for: Outstanding contributions in affirming life's spiritual dimension, whether through insight, discovery, or practical works
- Location: West Conshohocken, Pennsylvania
- Country: United States
- Presented by: Templeton Foundation
- Reward: £1.1 million (2019)
- First award: 1973
- Currently held by: Simon Conway Morris
- Website: templetonprize.org

The Templeton Prize is an annual award granted to a living person, in the estimation of the judges, "whose exemplary achievements advance Sir John Templeton's philanthropic vision: harnessing the power of the sciences to explore the deepest questions of the universe and humankind's place and purpose within it." It was established, funded and administered by John Templeton starting in 1972. It is co-funded by the John Templeton Foundation, Templeton Religion Trust, and Templeton World Charity Foundation, and administered by the John Templeton Foundation.

The prize was originally awarded to people working in the field of religion (Mother Teresa was the first winner), but in the 1980s the scope broadened to include people working at the intersection of science and religion. Until 2001, the name of the prize was "Templeton Prize for Progress in Religion", and from 2002 to 2008 it was called the "Templeton Prize for Progress Toward Research or Discoveries about Spiritual Realities". Hindus, Christians, Jews, Buddhists and Muslims have been on the panel of judges and have been recipients of the prize.

The monetary value of the prize is adjusted so that it exceeds that of the Nobel Prizes; Templeton felt, according to The Economist, that "spirituality was ignored" in the Nobel Prizes. As of 2019, it is £1.1 million. It was typically presented by Prince Philip, during his lifetime, in ceremonies held at Buckingham Palace.

The prize has been referred to as prestigious and coveted, with The Washington Post calling it the most prestigious award in religion. While atheist scientists Richard Dawkins, Harry Kroto and Jerry Coyne have criticized the prize, alleging it is "blurring [religion's] well-demarcated border with science" and being awarded "to scientists who are either religious themselves or say nice things about religion", the criticism was rejected by atheist and 2011 laureate Martin Rees, who pointed to his own and other laureates' atheism and that their research in fields such as psychology, evolutionary biology, and economy can hardly be classified as the "promotion of religion".

== Laureates ==
Year	Laureate		Notes	Ref(s)
1973	Mother Teresa facing right	Mother Teresa	Founder of the Missionaries of Charity; 1979 Nobel Peace Prize laureate	
1974	Head shot of Roger	Brother Roger	Founder of the Taizé Community	
1975		Sarvepalli Radhakrishnan	Former President of India, advocate of non-aggression with Pakistan	
1976		Leo Joseph Suenens	Pioneer in the Catholic Charismatic Renewal movement	
1977	Head shot of Lubich smiling and wearing glasses	Chiara Lubich	Founder of the Focolare Movement	
1978	—	Thomas F. Torrance	Former Moderator of the General Assembly of the Church of Scotland	
1979		Nikkyō Niwano	Co-founder of the Risshō Kōsei Kai	
1980	—	Ralph Wendell Burhoe	Founder of the journal Zygon	
1981		Cicely Saunders	Founder of the hospice and palliative care movement	
1982	Head shot of Graham	Billy Graham	Evangelist	
1983	Head shot of Solzhenitsyn	Aleksandr Solzhenitsyn	Soviet dissident novelist; Nobel laureate	
1984	—	Michael Bourdeaux	Founder of the Keston Institute	
1985	—	Sir Alister Hardy	Founder of the Religious Experience Research Centre	
1986		James I. McCord	Former president, Princeton Theological Seminary	
1987		Stanley Jaki	Benedictine priest; professor of astrophysics, Seton Hall University	
1988	—	Inamullah Khan	Former secretary-general, Modern World Muslim Congress	
1989		Carl Friedrich Freiherr von Weizsäcker (Note: Carl Friedrich von Weizsäcker and Lord MacLeod of Fuinary were jointly awarded the prize in 1989.)	Physicist and philosopher	
1989	—	George MacLeod	Founder of the Iona Community	
1990		Baba Amte (Note: Baba Amte and Charles Birch were jointly awarded the prize in 1990.)	Developer of modern communities for people suffering from leprosy	
1990	—	Charles Birch	Emeritus professor, University of Sydney	
1991		Immanuel Jakobovits, Baron Jakobovits	Former Chief Rabbi of Great Britain and the Commonwealth	
1992		Kyung-Chik Han	Evangelist and founder of Youngnak Presbyterian Church, Seoul. From northern Korea.	
1993		Charles Colson	Founder of the Prison Fellowship	
1994	Head shot of Novak speaking	Michael Novak	Philosopher and diplomat	
1995		Paul Davies	Theoretical physicist	
1996		Bill Bright	Founder of the Campus Crusade for Christ	
1997		Pandurang Shastri Athavale	Social reformer and philosopher, founder of the Swadhyaya Movement	
1998	—	Sir Sigmund Sternberg	Philanthropist; founder of the Three Faith Forum	
1999	Head-and-shoulders portrait of Ian Barbour	Ian Barbour	Former professor of science, technology and society, Carleton College	
2000		Freeman Dyson	Theoretical and mathematical physicist, mathematician, and statistician	
2001	—	Arthur Peacocke	Former dean, Clare College, Cambridge	
2002		John Polkinghorne	Physicist and theologian	
2003		Holmes Rolston III	Philosopher	
2004		George F. R. Ellis	Cosmologist and philosopher	
2005		Charles Hard Townes	Nobel laureate and physicist	
2006		John D. Barrow	Cosmologist and theoretical physicist	
2007		Charles Taylor	Philosopher	
2008		Michał Heller	Physicist and philosopher	
2009		Bernard d'Espagnat	Physicist	
2010		Francisco J. Ayala	Biologist	
2011		Martin Rees	Cosmologist and astrophysicist	
2012		14th Dalai Lama, Tenzin Gyatso	Spiritual leader of Tibetan Buddhism, and 1989 Nobel Peace Prize laureate	
2013		Desmond Tutu	Nobel laureate, social rights activist and retired Anglican archbishop	
2014		Tomáš Halík	Roman Catholic priest, theologian, philosopher	
2015		Jean Vanier	Catholic theologian, humanitarian and founder of L'Arche and Faith and Light	
2016		Jonathan Sacks	Former Chief Rabbi of Great Britain, philosopher, and scholar of Judaism	
2017		Alvin Plantinga	American scholar, philosopher, and writer	
2018		Abdullah II of Jordan	King of Jordan	
2019		Marcelo Gleiser	Brazilian physicist and astronomer, Professor of Physics and Astronomy at Dartmouth College	
2020		Francis Collins	Geneticist and physician	
2021		Jane Goodall	Ethologist, activist and renowned chimpanzee researcher	
2022		Frank Wilczek	Theoretical physicist	
2023		Edna Adan Ismail	Health care advocate	
2024		Pumla Gobodo-Madikizela	Psychologist	
2025		Bartholomew I of Constantinople	Ecumenical Patriarch of Constantinople	
2026		Simon Conway Morris	Evolutionary biologist	

== See also ==
- List of religion-related awards
- Lists of science and technology awards
