= Tessy Thomas =

Indian scientist

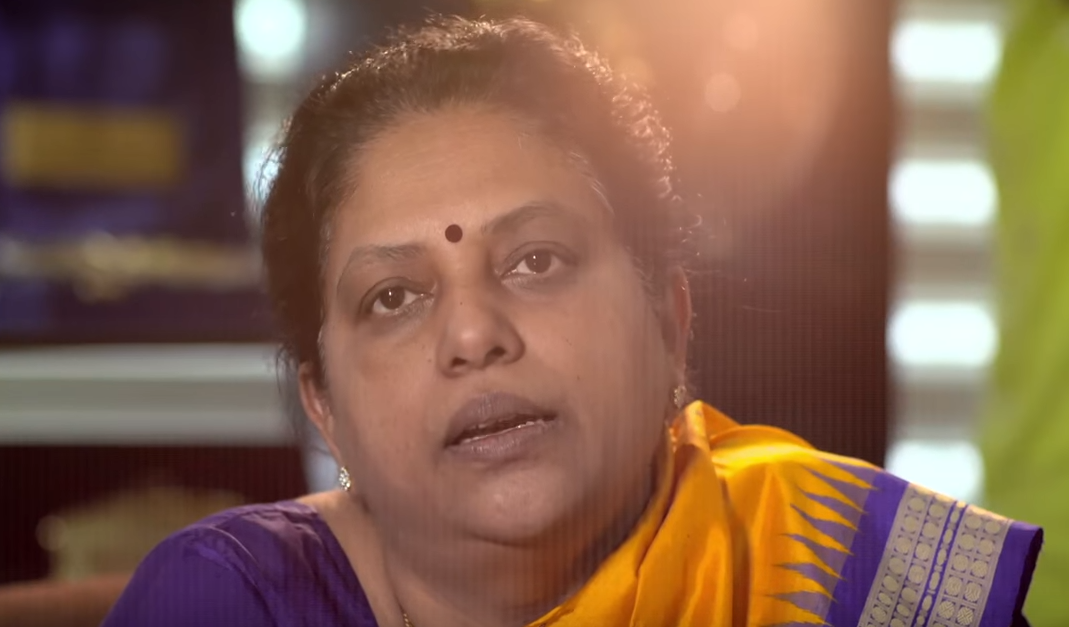

Director General (Aeronautical Systems), DRDO
- In office 1 June 2018 – 30 April 2023
- Preceded by: CP Ramnarayan
- Succeeded by: M Z Siddique

Personal details
- Born: 1963 (age 63) Alappuzha, Kerala, India
- Spouse: Saroj Kumar
- Children: 1
- Occupation: Project director at DRDO
- Known for: Agni Missile Project Director

Tessy Thomas (born April 1963) is an Indian aerospace engineer who worked on India's missile programs. She joined the Defence Research and Development Organisation in 1985. In 2009, she became the project director of the Agni-IV ballistic missile. She has been called India's "Missile Woman" and "Agniputri" in the media.

== Early life and education ==
Tessy is from Alleppy, Kerala. She completed her B.Tech at Thrissur Engineering College. Later, she earned an M.Tech in Guided Missile from the Institute of Armament Technology in Pune, where she also worked as a faculty member.

== Career ==
Since 1988, she has worked at the Defence Research and Development Laboratory in Hyderabad on missile development. Her main work was designing guidance systems. She is also an expert in solid propellants used in Agni missiles.

She worked as Assistant Project Director during the successful launch of Agni-III in May 2008.

In 2009, she became the project director of the Agni-IV ballistic missile. After this appointment, the media called her India's "Missile Woman" and "Agniputri."

== Personal life ==
She is married to Saroj Kumar, a commander in the Indian Navy and they have a son.

== Awards ==
Tessy received the Lal Bahadur Shastri National Award for her contribution for making India self-reliant in the field of missile technology.

She was also the recipient of the Dr Thomas Cangan Leadership Award at the Faculty of Management Studies – Institute of Rural Management, Jaipur (FMS-IRM) in 2018.

Tessy won 'Woman pioneer of the year' award at ETPrime Women Leadership Awards 2023 which was held in Mumbai. The same year, she became a laureate of the Asian Scientist 100 by the Asian Scientist.

In 2025, She is awarded with Paulos Mar Gregorios Award for her exceptional contributions to Science and Technology.

== Publications ==
- Thomas, Tessy (1 July 2005). "Guidance Scheme for Solid Propelled Vehicle during Atmospheric Phase". Defence Science Journal. 55 (3): 253–264. doi:10.14429/dsj.55.1987.
- Sudhakar, R.; Venkanna, M.; Rao, B. V. Papa; Thomas, Tessy (2017). "Prediction of Real Gas and Non-Equilibrium Effects in the Gas Dynamics of Canister Launch Missile". 30th International Symposium on Ballistics. doi:10.12783/ballistics2017/16878. ISBN 978-1-60595-419-6.
- Thomas, Tessy; Jahagirdar, D R; Krishna, I V Murali; Varaprasad, L. (May 2013). "Online Trajectory Reshaping for a Launch Vehicle to Minimize the Final Error Caused by Navigation and Guidance". Defence Science Journal. 63 (3). New Delhi: 254–261. doi:10.14429/dsj.63.2414. ProQuest 1413260295.
- Ghogale, Shrikant; Venkanna, M.; Rao, B.V. Papa; Thomas, Tessy (2017). "Developmental Challenges during Realization of High Progressivity Rocket Motor". 30th International Symposium on Ballistics. doi:10.12783/ballistics2017/16860. ISBN 978-1-60595-419-6.

== See also ==
- Agni (missile)
