= Roha =

Town in Maharashtra, India

- Town
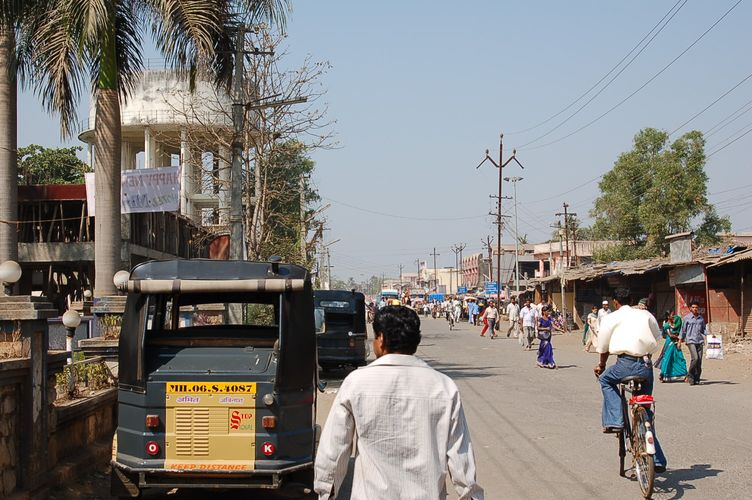
- Roha – Kolad Road

- Location in Maharashtra, India
- Coordinates: 18.4369°N 73.1197°E
- Country: India
- State: Maharashtra
- District: Raigad district

Government
  - Body: Roha-Ashtami Municipal Council

Population (2011)
  - Total: 20,849

Languages
  - Official: Marathi
- Time zone: UTC+5:30 (IST)
- PIN: 402109
- Telephone code: 02194
- Vehicle registration: MH-06
- Lok Sabha constituency: Raigad
- Vidhan Sabha constituency: Shrivardhan

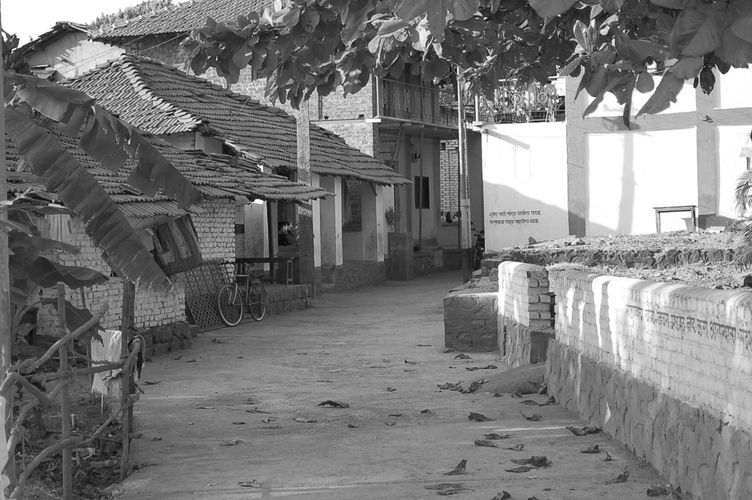
Roha in the 1970s

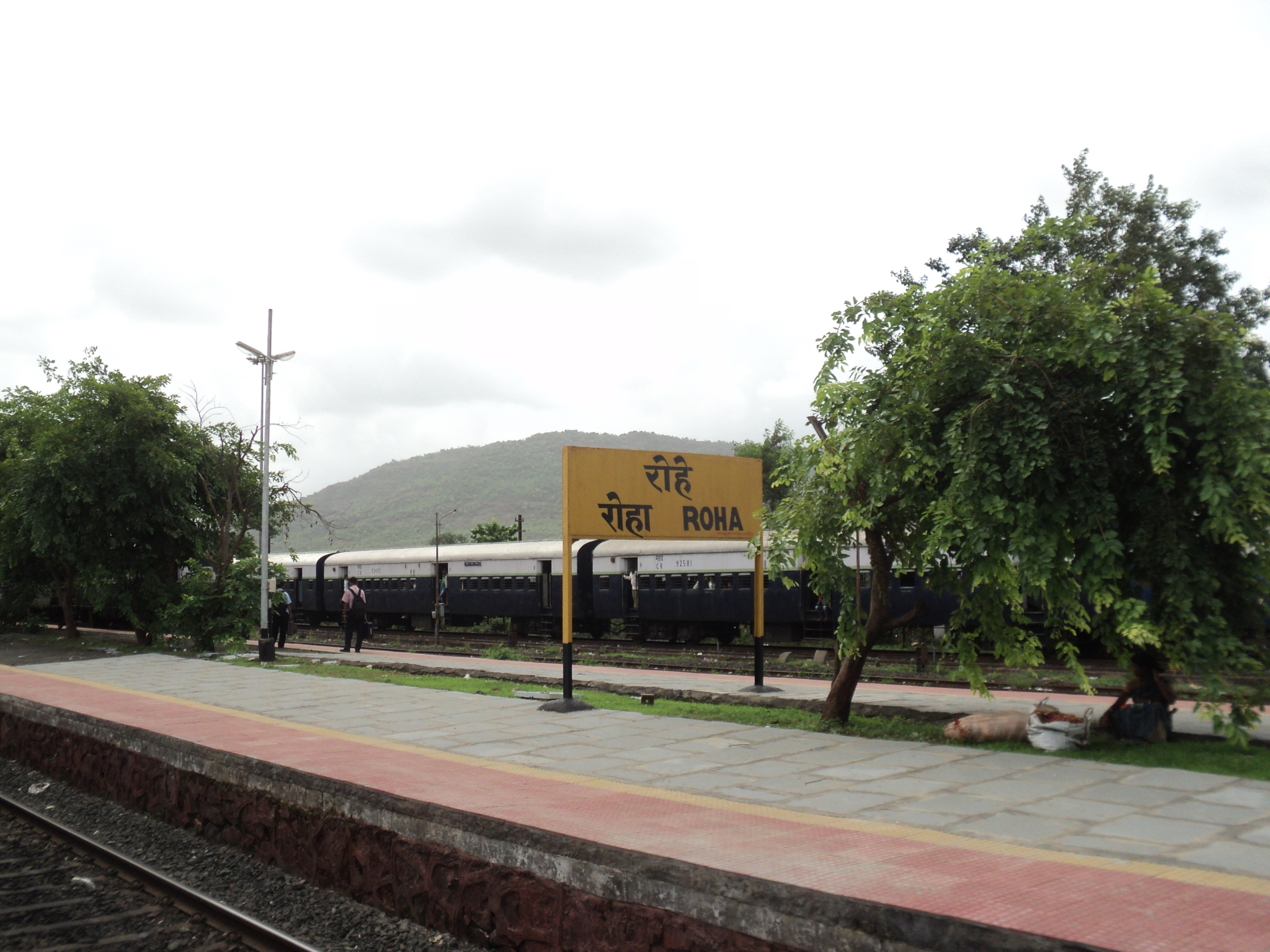
Roha railway station

Roha (Marathi: रोहा) is a town and the headquarters of Roha taluka in the Raigad district of Maharashtra, India. It is located 120km south-east of Mumbai, in the Konkan region of western India.

== Demographics ==
As per the 2011 Census of India, Roha had a population of approximately 20,849. Marathi being the official and predominant language.

Roha had an overall literacy rate of 93.66%, significantly above Maharashtra's average of 82.34%. Male literacy was 95.45%, while female literacy stood at 91.82%.

== Transport ==
=== Rail ===
Roha railway station serves the town and is one of the principal railway stations in the Konkan region. It is connected to Mumbai via the Panvel–Roha line and serves as the northern terminus of the Konkan Railway.

=== Road ===
The town lies close to National Highway 66 (Mumbai–Goa Highway), which is accessible via Kolad Road. Regular bus services are operated by the Maharashtra State Road Transport Corporation and private operators. The nearest airport is Chhatrapati Shivaji Maharaj International Airport in Mumbai, located about 86 km from the town.

== Administration ==
The town is governed by Roha-Ashtami Municipal Council. For parliamentary representation, Roha is a part of the Raigad Lok Sabha constituency. At the state legislature, it falls within the Shrivardhan Assembly constituency.

== Notable people ==
- C. D. Deshmukh (1896–1982), 4th Finance Minister of India from 1950 to 1956. First Indian Governor of the Reserve Bank of India from 1943 to 1949.
- Pandurang Shastri Athavale (1920–2003), Indian activist and spiritual leader. Born in Roha.
- Avadhut Tatkare (born 1979), Member of the Maharashtra Legislative Assembly for Shrivardhan from 2014 to 2019. President of the Roha-Ashtami Municipal Council from 2009 to 2015.

== Climate ==
Köppen-Geiger climate classification system classifies its climate as tropical wet and dry

Climate data for Roha
Month	Jan	Feb	Mar	Apr	May	Jun	Jul	Aug	Sep	Oct	Nov	Dec	Year
Mean daily maximum °C (°F)	29.1 (84.4)	29.6 (85.3)	31.2 (88.2)	32.5 (90.5)	33.1 (91.6)	31.4 (88.5)	29.4 (84.9)	29 (84)	29.7 (85.5)	31.6 (88.9)	31.7 (89.1)	30.4 (86.7)	30.7 (87.3)
Daily mean °C (°F)	23.8 (74.8)	24.3 (75.7)	26.5 (79.7)	28.6 (83.5)	29.8 (85.6)	28.6 (83.5)	27.2 (81.0)	26.8 (80.2)	27 (81)	27.7 (81.9)	26.5 (79.7)	24.9 (76.8)	26.8 (80.3)
Mean daily minimum °C (°F)	18.6 (65.5)	19.1 (66.4)	21.8 (71.2)	24.7 (76.5)	26.5 (79.7)	25.9 (78.6)	25.1 (77.2)	24.7 (76.5)	24.3 (75.7)	23.8 (74.8)	21.4 (70.5)	19.4 (66.9)	22.9 (73.3)
Average precipitation mm (inches)	0 (0)	0 (0)	0 (0)	2 (0.1)	24 (0.9)	687 (27.0)	1,364 (53.7)	889 (35.0)	398 (15.7)	113 (4.4)	14 (0.6)	1 (0.0)	3,492 (137.4)
Source: Climate-Data.org (altitude: 9m)

Summers are hot and humid with temperatures touching 37-39 degrees Celsius. Rains are pretty heavy during monsoon. Winters are not so chilly with temperatures falling to 11-12 degrees Celsius. Average annual rainfall in Roha is 3450mm.
