= Youngnak Presbyterian Church =

Church in Seoul, South Korea

- Youngnak Presbyterian Church, Seoul
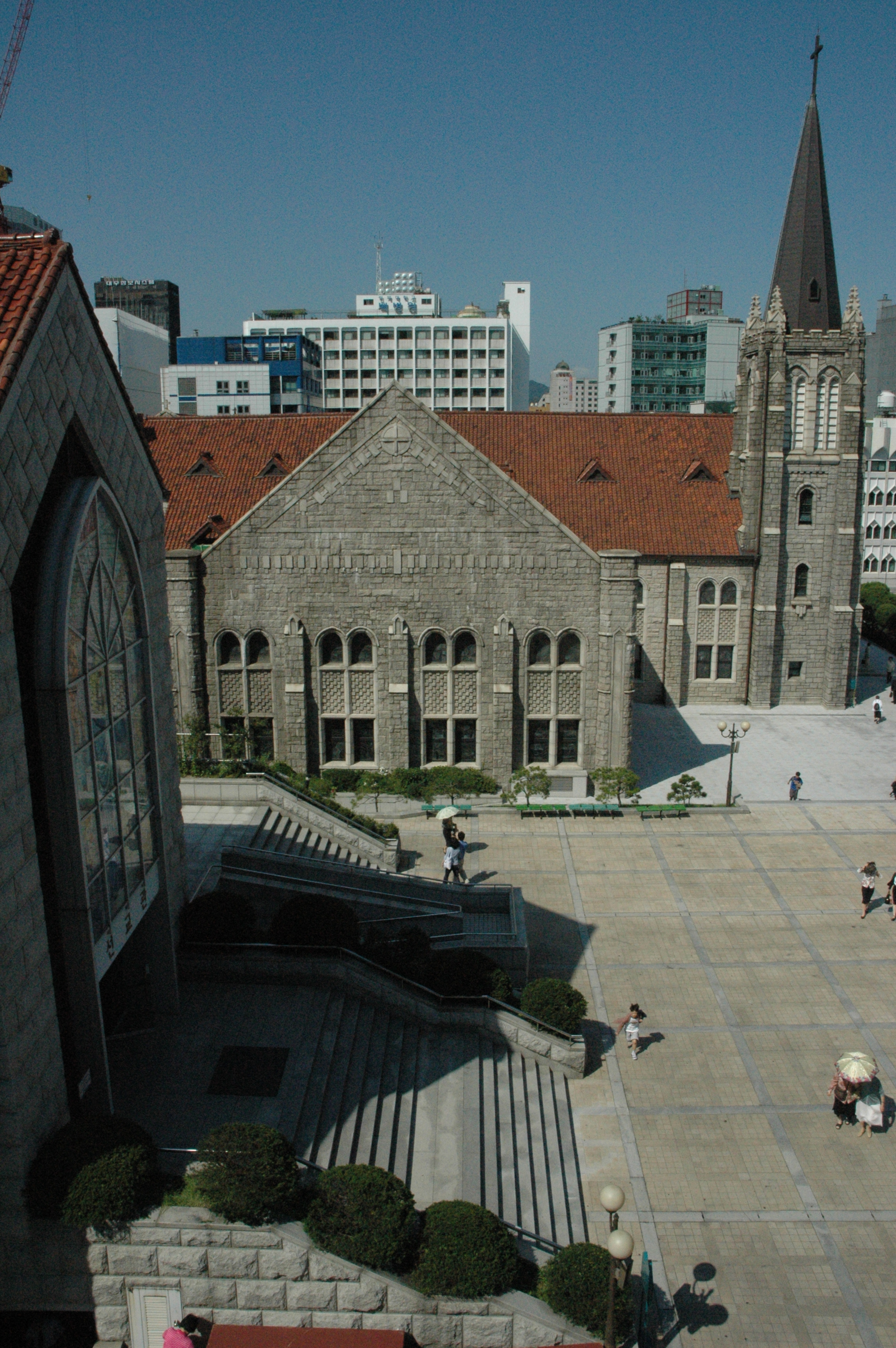
- Youngnak Presbyterian Church; Main Sanctuary and Mission Chapel (right).
- Youngnak Presbyterian Church
- 37.563954°N 126.988946°E
- Location: Seoul
- Country: Republic of Korea
- Denomination: Presbyterian Church of Korea (TongHap)
- Previous denomination: Presbyterian Church of Korea
- Website: youngnak.net

History
- Founded: 2 December 1945

- Youngnak Presbyterian Church
- Hangul: 영락교회
- Hanja: 永樂敎會
- Revised Romanization: Yeongnak Gyohoe
- McCune–Reischauer: Yŏngnak Kyohoe

Youngnak Presbyterian Church (Korean: 영락교회) is a church in Seoul, South Korea. It was founded on 2 December 1945 by Kyung-Chik Han, who later won the 1992 Templeton Prize. Inaugurated by twenty-seven refugees from Soviet-occupied Korea, Youngnak steadily increased in membership as more refugees sought religious freedom below the 38th parallel.

On 24 March 1949, ground was broken for a new facility to replace the building and tent that had become too small for the growing congregation. By the time the new church building was completed in May 1950, membership had increased to over 4,000. By 1992, when Rev. Han was awarded the Templeton Prize for Progress in Religion, membership had grown to 60,000 (making it, at that time, the largest Presbyterian congregation in the world), excluding 500 sister churches planted by members of the original congregation.

In 1998, under the auspices of Rev. Han, who at the time was a Pastor Emeritus, Youngnak gained an English language ministry, International Worship in English, which was founded by an American missionary to Korea, Bill Majors. For his efforts, Majors was made an Honorary Citizen of Seoul in 2005.

== Senior pastors ==
- 1949–1973: Han Kyung-chik
- 1973–1985: Park Cho-joon
- 1985–1997c: Kim Yoon-guk
- 1988–1997c: Lim Young-soo
- 1997–2018: Lee Chul-shin
- 2018 to present: Kim Woon-sung

== Gallery ==
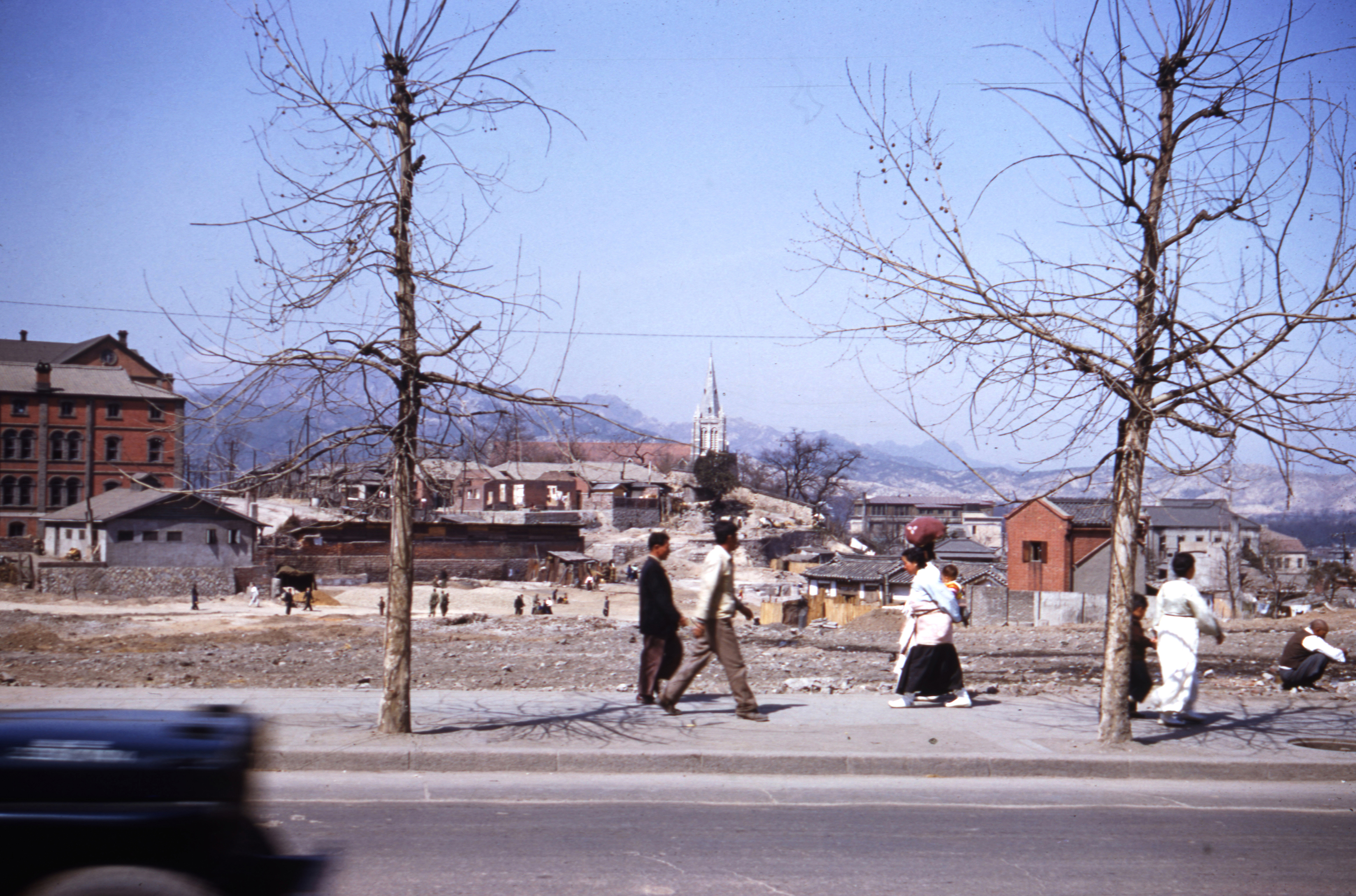
The church can be seen in the background, center of this picture (1953)

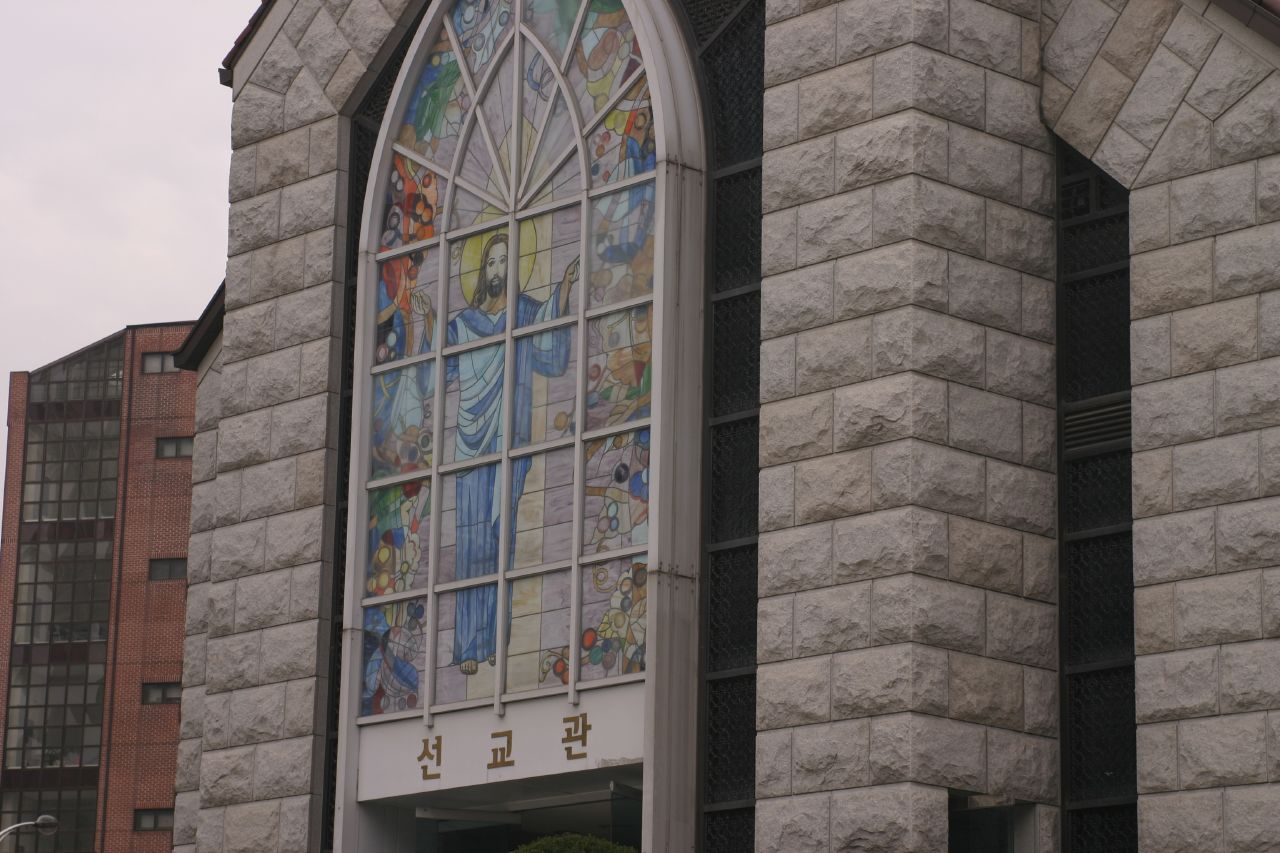
Stained glass window at the church (2007)

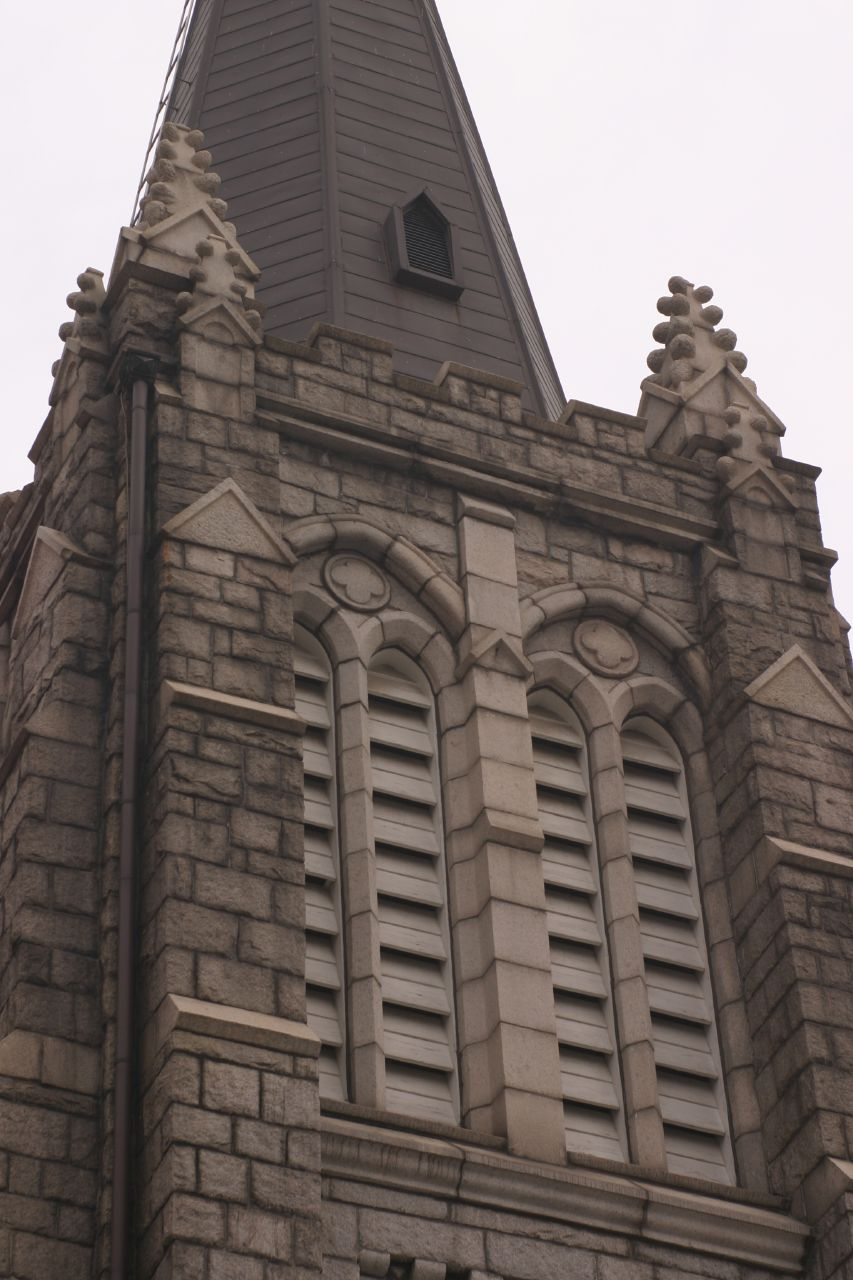
Steeple (2007)
