= World Vision United States =

Evangelical organization

World Vision
- Founded: 1950
- Founder: Robert Pierce
- Type: Non-governmental organization
- Purpose: Well being of all people, especially children.
- Location: Federal Way, Washington, U.S.
- Region served: United States
- Method: Emergency relief, community development, policy and advocacy
- Key people: Edgar Sandoval Sr. (president) Richard Stearns (past president)
- Revenue: US$1.6 billion (2007)
- Website: www.worldvision.org

World Vision United States is a member and founding organization of World Vision International. Founded in the United States in 1950, it is an evangelical relief and development organization. It is one of the largest relief and development organizations in the US with a 1.6 billion dollar budget (2007).

== History ==
World Vision was founded in 1950 by Dr. Robert Pierce ("Bob"), a young American evangelist minister whom the Youth for Christ missionary movement had first sent to China and South Korea in 1947. Pierce served for almost two decades at the helm of World Vision, but retired in 1967 from the organization.

During his journey he was moved by one little girl's suffering to promise to the local church of the child a monthly sum to guarantee her protection. It has created the concept of funding for children and World Vision.

At first the organization focused on orphans and other children in need, beginning in South Korea, then expanding throughout Asia. The program soon spread throughout Latin America, Eastern Europe, Africa, and the Middle East. In the 1960s, the group started providing food, clothing, and medical care to citizens of impoverished countries after natural disasters by soliciting donations from major corporations.

From 1966 onward, the organization used in business also the name "World Vision International" but from 1977 on this name was reserved for the umbrella organisation World Vision International. and the founding organization as a member of World Vision International is called World Vision United States whenever a distinction is necessary.

Later, in 1998 Richard Stearns became president of World Vision US. On January 9, 2018, it was announced that Stearns would be retiring from the organization after nearly 20 years as President.

On May 31, 2018, it was announced that Edgar Sandoval would replace Stearns as World Vision's new President and CEO beginning October 1, 2018.

== Organizational structure ==
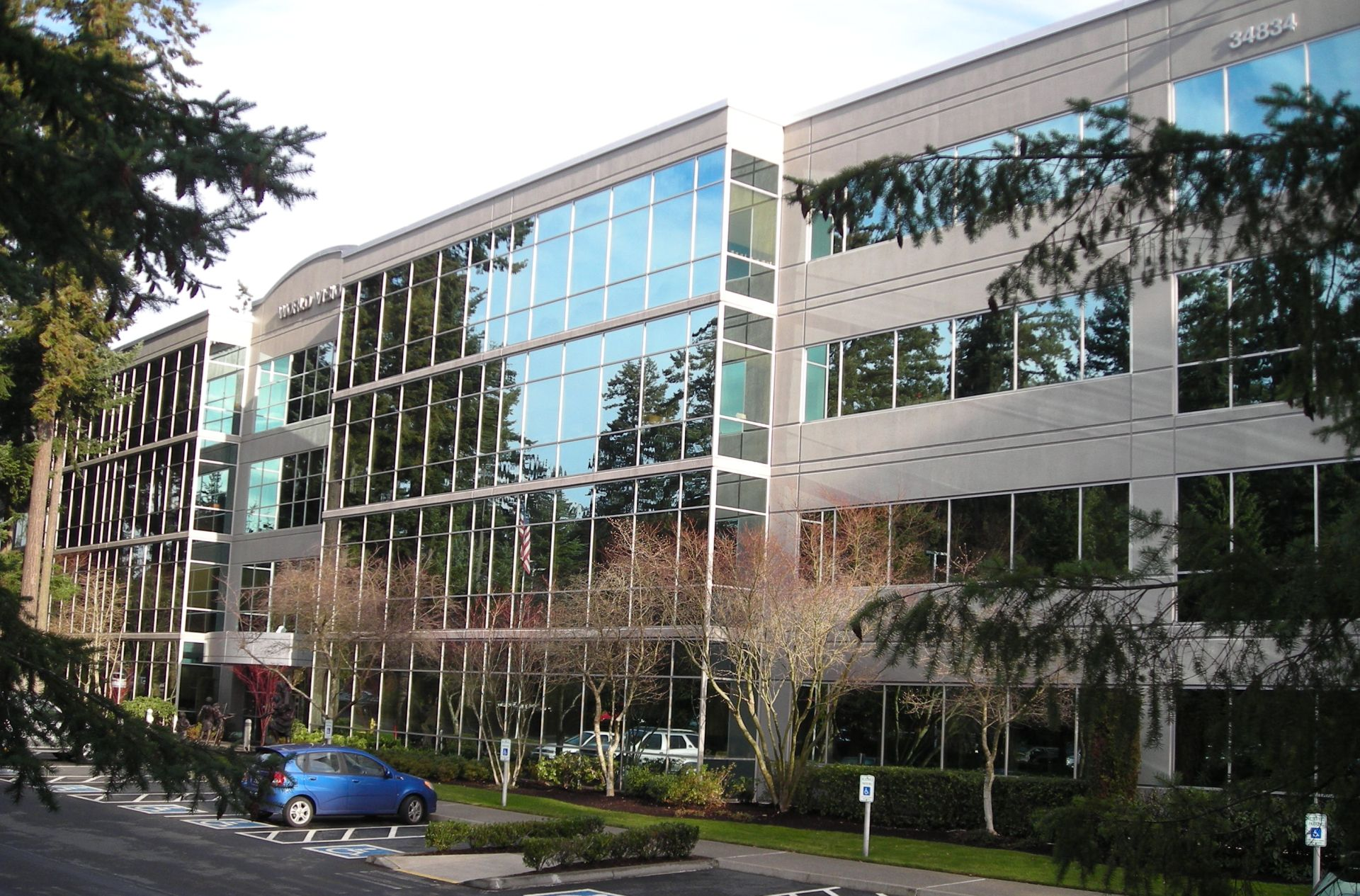
main office in the World Vision US headquarters office complex in Federal Way, Washington

World Vision US is an independently registered interdependent national member office of the federal umbrella organization World Vision International. The relationship with the central organization is governed by the "Covenant of Partnership", that all national members sign. It provides that the national organizations must accept policies and decisions of the umbrella organization. and must not establish an office or program outside the US without the consent of the central group and the host country. Furthermore, except for direct project founding, all funds used outside the US have to be remitted through the central organization, and its financial and budget principles must be accepted. Additionally, the national group must also subscribes to the core values, the mission statement, and the Statement of Faith of World Vision.

== Spirituality ==
World Vision aims to incorporate Christian belief into their development work as well as their organization. US president Richard Stearns (retired) stated that the group has a strict policy against proselytizing, which he describes as "... - using any kind of coercion or inducement to listen to a religious message before helping someone." Like all other national members of the World Vision Partnership, World Vision US is committed to the concept of transformational development, which is cast in a biblical framework and in which evangelization is an inseparable integral part of development work.

Stearns stated that "hope" is World Vision's most lasting impression. He believes that if hope can be restored in a community it is more beneficial than adding a water well. He emphasizes that everyone lives in a religious world where more than 90% of the population believes in some faith. He claims that World Vision's understanding of faith is essential for development.

== Funding ==
World Vision uses the Sponsor a Child method of fundraising. Individuals, families, churches, schools, and other groups sponsor specific children or specific community projects in their own country or abroad. Sponsors send funds each month, to provide support for the sponsored children or projects.

According to its annual report, in 2008 87% of its funding was spent on programs, 8% on fundraising and 5% on management and general overhead.

== Activities ==
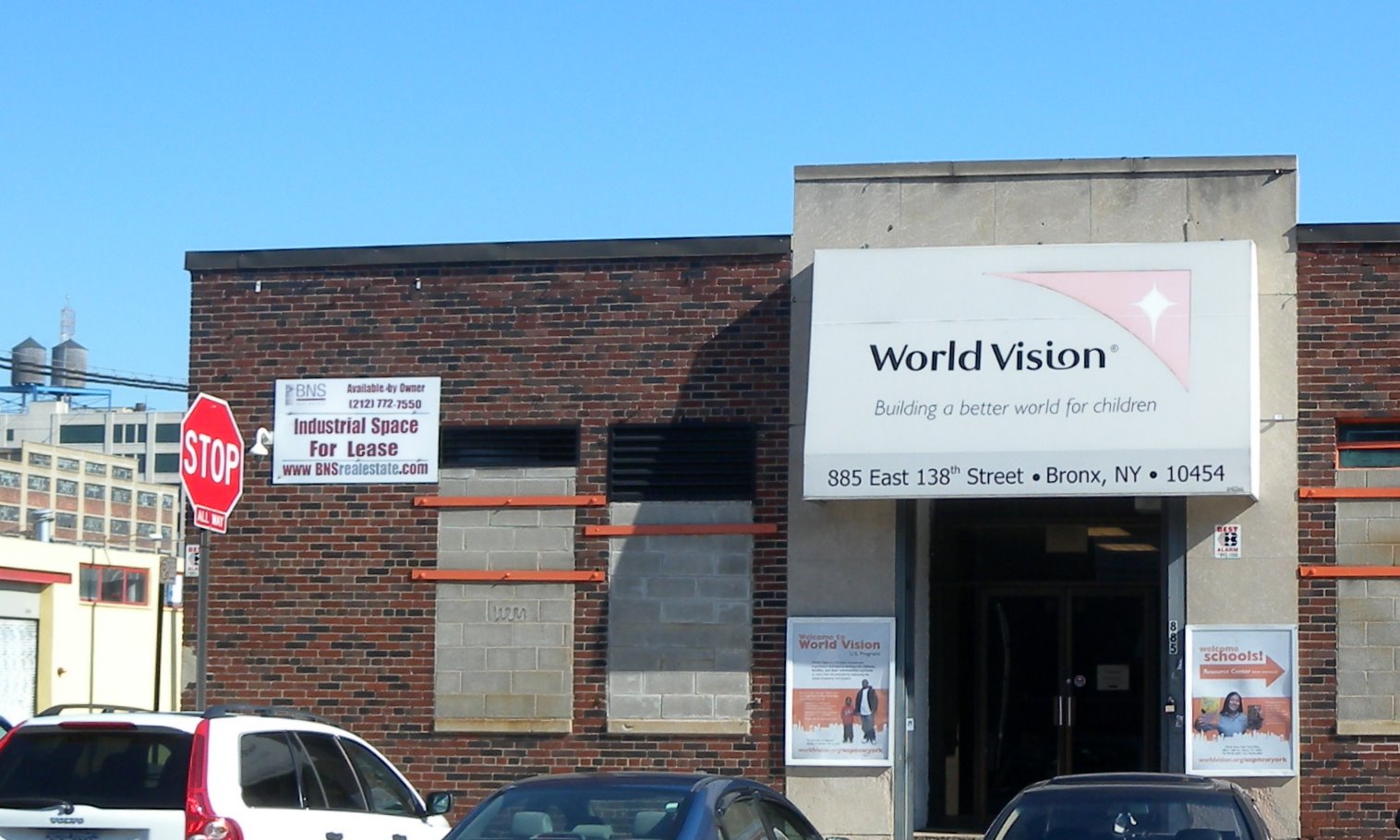
South Bronx

World Vision provides emergency relief to people whose lives are endangered by disasters or conflict and who need immediate assistance. It attempts to respond to all major emergencies around the world themselves or in cooperation with partner agencies. For example, World Vision responded to famine in Ethiopia and North Korea, hurricanes in Central America, the tsunami in the Indian Ocean nations, earthquakes in El Salvador, India, Taiwan, Turkey and the Sichuan earthquake in China, Cyclone Nargis in Myanmar and war refugees in Kosovo, Chechnya, Sierra Leone, Angola, and East Timor.

The organization encourages public awareness about the needs of others, the causes of poverty, and the nature of compassionate response. These efforts include collaboration with media and community participation in fundraising.

The organization devotes considerable effort to advocating to the US government. On March 1, 2011, along with 29 other faith-based groups, it sent a letter to the senate petitioning for the restoration of cuts made to foreign disaster assistance, global health, and food aid in the 2011 budget.

World Vision is a leading member of the U.S. Global Leadership Coalition, a Washington D.C.–based coalition of over 400 major companies and NGOs that advocates for a larger international affairs budget, which funds American diplomatic and development efforts abroad. World Vision is also a member of the Global Coalition Against Pneumonia and supports World Pneumonia Day on November 2, 2009.

== Criticism ==
In 1999, the academic journal Development in Practice published an overview of World Vision's history focusing on the evolution of its global architecture. The document, "Pursuing Partnership: World Vision and the Ideology of Development" was written by then World Vision staff person Alan Whaites, who went on to become a political scientist concerned with international development. He offered a picture of an organization that was often spurred to innovate and change as a result of internal reflection on external criticism.

=== Discrimination in hiring ===
In August 2010, the United States Court of Appeals for the Ninth Circuit ruled that "World Vision is a 'religious corporation' and therefore exempt from federal law barring faith-based discrimination, and thus was permitted to dismiss two employees who were fired because they did not believe in the "divinity of Jesus or the doctrine of the Trinity." Judge Marsha Berzon of that circuit dissented, arguing that "Congress did not intend to allow all religiously motivated nonprofits to be exempt from the law." She believes that the decision discriminates against employees who have the ability to do the assigned work just because of their religious views.

=== Same-sex marriage ===
On March 24, 2014, the World Vision US announced that it would hire what it defined as Christians in same-sex marriages. Facing protests from donors and the larger evangelical community after the announcement, World Vision reversed the policy change two days later.
