= Kyung-Chik Han =

South Korean pastor (1902–2000)

The Reverend Kyung-Chik Han
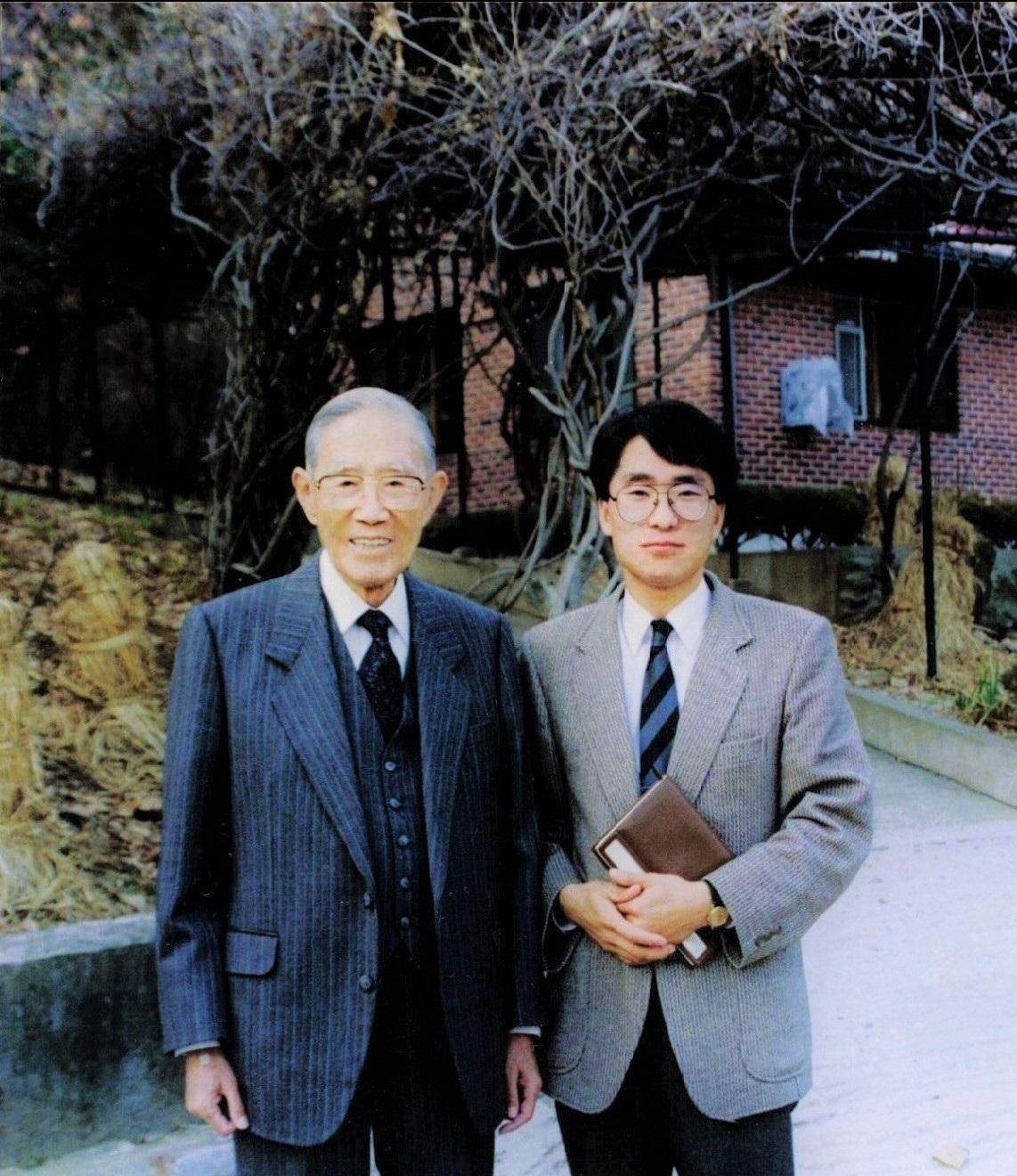
- Kyung-Chik Han, left, in 1991.
- Born: Han Kyung-Chik; 9 December 1902; Kan-ri, Korean Empire
- Died: 19 April 2000 (aged 97); Seoul, South Korea
- Other name: Pastor Han
- Citizenship: Republic of Korea
- Education: Soongsil University; College of Emporia; Princeton Theological Seminary
- Occupations: Cleric, theologian, author
- Parent(s): Do-pung Han & Mrs Lee

Ecclesiastical career
- Religion: Christianity (Presbyterian)
- Church: Presbyterian Church of Korea (TongHap)
- Ordained: 1933
- Writings: Kyung-Chik Han collection, May the Words of My Mouth
- Congregations: Youngnak Presbyterian Church, Seoul

- Kyung-Chik Han
- Hangul: 한경직
- Hanja: 韓景職
- RR: Han Gyeongjik
- MR: Han Kyŏngjik

Kyung-Chik Han (9 December 1902 – 19 April 2000) was a South Korean pastor and church planter and the recipient of the 1992 Templeton Prize for Progress in Religion.

== Biography ==
Han was born in Kan-ri, P'yŏngwŏn County, Korean Empire. He graduated from Soongsil University (B. S. 1925), the College of Emporia (B.A. 1926), and Princeton Theological Seminary (B. D. 1929). Ordained in 1933 by the Presbyterian Church of Korea, Han later founded Youngnak Presbyterian Church in 1945, which he pastored until 1973 and served as a Pastor Emeritus for until his death. At the time that he received the Templeton Prize, membership of Youngnak Presbyterian Church had grown to 60,000 making it the largest Presbyterian church in the world and the church had fostered about 500 sister churches worldwide.

== Legacy ==
Kyung-Chik Han is primarily known for his leadership and humility. While Youngnak is no longer the biggest church in South Korea, it is, however, the most prominent Protestant church in the country. Like Kyung-Chik Han himself, his church's earliest ministry was primarily to northern defectors and this remains a hallmark of Young-nak church to this day.

A significant party of his ministry involved humanitarian work with children during the Korean War. This was well underway when American evangelical, Robert Pierce, visited South Korea. The two worked together to build the foundations of World Vision, one of the world's largest humanitarian organisation today.

When he was awarded a Templeton Prize, he sold it and gave the money to charity. When he retired he moved to a modest cabin in the mountains and ensured that his sons did not receive the inheritance from his ministry or assume his position as many ministers in Korea do. There is a small museum at Young-nak Church in his honour.

== Bibliography ==
- Just Three More Years to Live! The Story of Rev. Kyung-Chik Han. 2005 ISBN 89-5721-439-9
