= Swadhyaya Movement =

Religious movement

The Swadhyaya Movement or Swadhyaya Parivara started in the mid-20th century in the western states of India, particularly Maharashtra and Gujarat. Founded by Pandurang Shastri Athavale (1920-2003), the movement emphasizes self-study (swadhyaya), selfless devotion (bhakti) and application of Indian scriptures such as the Upanishads and Bhagavad Gita for spiritual, social and economic liberation.

The movement focuses on the Upanishadic mahāvākyas (great teachings) related with Vedic belief that God is within oneself, every human being, all living beings and all of God's creation. It encourages voluntary self-study, self-knowledge, community discourses and action with a responsibility to God in oneself and others. Its temples typically highlight the deities Yogeshwara Krishna, Parvati, Ganesha and Shiva in a Vriksha Mandir ("temple of trees") setting. The sun is considered a deity, Surya. Prayers are performed in the Smarta tradition's Panchayatana puja format, attributed to Adi Shankara. Community members participate in bhavabhakti (emotional devotion to the divine), krutibhakti (actional devotion by voluntary service to the divine in all of God's creation), and bhaktipheri (devotional travel to meet, work and help the well-being of community partners). The movement members treat all men and women in the organization as a Parivara (family).

According to Pandurang Shashtri Athavale, swadhyay means the study, knowledge, and discovery of the "self". The "Self" or the "I" is the indwelling spirit underlying the ego, intellect, and the mind. Swadhyay involves studying, discovering, knowing, and understanding one's true and inner self and paying respect to others. It is not a sect, cult, creed, tradition, or institution. It does not require any membership or vows. Swadhyay is about individual transformation through spiritual awareness. It is an attitude of the mind.

Swadhyay emphasizes the concept of an indwelling God. "God dwells within", i.e. "God exists within me and within everyone else". All are children of the Divine. Hence, Swadhyay establishes the Divine Brotherhood under the Fatherhood of God i.e. "the other is not ‘other’, but he is my divine brother." Blood relationship is extended to a relationship through the Blood Maker. The concept of the traditional family is extended to the Divine Family. This is a natural extension of the concept of an indwelling God.

== History ==
Pandurang Shastri Athavale was born in a Maharashtrian Brahmin family in colonial India. While he was in his early twenties, he began to deliver discourses on the Bhagavad Gita in Mumbai, India. He argued that both the liberal welfare-centric approach and socialism were incapable of bridging the gap between the rich and the needy. He rejected charity handouts, arguing that this creates a dependent relationship, attacks human dignity, and robs the recipient's sense of self-worth. He sought another way for liberating oneself spiritually, economically, and socially. He believed that the foundation and values for such a search were in the ancient texts of Hinduism. He began preaching these principles from the Upanishads and the Bhagavad Gita in his community, particularly in the downtrodden segments of society he called Agri, Bagri, and Sagri. This initiative began Athavale's Swadhyaya movement in 1958. His followers call him "Dada" (older brother).

The movement refuses any support or assistance from the state or non-governmental organizations (NGOs), relying entirely on the volunteer activity of its members. It has between 50,000 and 100,000 centres ("kendra" locations) and between 6 and 20 million followers in India, Portugal, USA, UK, Canada, Australia, New Zealand and the Middle East.

== Etymology ==
In standard Classical Sanskrit, svādhyāyaḥ (Devanāgarī: स्वाध्याय:) means study (adhyāya) of the self (sva), i.e., self study, or self-development. For Athavale and the pariwar (family), Swadhyay is interpreted as fostering a habit of self-introspection, analyzing one's own self in order to improve. The understanding of an in-dwelling God imbibed into Swadhyayees (practitioners of Swadhyay) by Athavale is said to motivate them towards true expression of devotion (Bhakti).

=== Scriptures and foundation ===
==== Bhagavad Gita ====
===== Geeta 4.28 =====
dravya-yajñās tapo-yajñā yoga-yajñās tathāpare

swādhyāya-jñāna-yajñāśh cha yatayaḥ sanśhita-vratāḥ

Some offer their wealth as a sacrifice, while others offer severe austerities as a sacrifice. Some practice the eight-fold path of yogic practices, and yet others study the scriptures and cultivate knowledge as a sacrifice while observing strict vows.

===== Geeta 16.1 =====
abhayaṁ sattva-sanśhuddhir jñāna-yoga-vyavasthitiḥ

dānaṁ damaśh cha yajñaśh cha svādhyāyas tapa ārjavam

O son of Bharat, these are the saintly virtues of those endowed with a divine nature—fearlessness, purity of mind, steadfastness in spiritual knowledge, charity, control of the senses, performance of sacrifice, study of the sacred books, austerity, and straightforwardness;

===== Geeta 17.15 =====
anudvega-karam vakyam satyam priya-hitam ca yat

svadhyaya bhyasanam caiva van-mayam tapa ucyate

The austerity of speech consists in speaking words that are truthful, pleasing, beneficial, and not agitating to others, and also in regularly reciting Vedic literature.

==== Taittiriya Upanishad ====
Main article: Taittiriya Upanishad

Hymn 1.9.1 emphasizes the central importance of Svadhyaya in one's pursuit of Reality (Ṛta), Truth (Satya), Self-restraint (Damah), Perseverance (Tapas), Tranquility and Inner Peace (Samas), Relationships with others, family, guests (Praja, Prajana, Manush, Atithi) and all Rituals (Agnaya, Agnihotram).

Taittiriya Upanishad, however, adds in verse 1.9.1, that along with the virtue of 'svādhyāyā' process of learning, one must teach and share (pravacana) what one learns. This is expressed by the phrase "'svādhyāyapravacane ca'", translated as "and learning and teaching" by Gambhīrānanda

In verse 1.11.1, the final chapter in the education of a student, the Taittiriya Upanishad reminds:

सत्यंवद। धर्मंचर। स्वाध्यायान्माप्रमदः।

Speak the Satya, follow the Dharma, from Svadhyaya never cease.

— Taittiriya Upanishad, 1.11.1-2

==== Patanjali's Yogasutra ====
Main article: Yoga Sutras of Patanjali

Verse II.44, recommends Svadhyaya as follows

स्वाध्यायादिष्टदेवतासंप्रयोगः॥

From study comes a connection with one's chosen deity.

— Patanjali's Yogasutra II.44

== Theology ==
The Swadhyay Movement is founded on the concept of an "Indwelling God" within everything. Thus, within the Swadhyay theology, everything is divine. This belief in the indwelling divine is extended to trees, water, earth, and animals. The teachers in the Swadhyay Parivar assert that it is not a sect, a cult, a creed, a tradition, an institution, an organization, or even an organized religion. It is believed to be an attitude of the mind. It does not require any membership or vows. Swadhyay is independent of caste, religion, nationality, color, education, and one's status in society. Swadhyay is about individual transformation through spiritual awareness. Swadhyay is the right perspective or vision, which enables one to understand deeper aspects of spirituality and devotion. The basic fundamental thought that Swadhyay emphasizes is the concept of an indwelling God. 'God dwells within', i.e., 'God exists within me and within everyone else'. All are children of the Divine. Hence, Swadhyay establishes the Divine Brotherhood under the Fatherhood of God, i.e., 'the other is not 'other', but he is my divine brother.' The concept of the traditional family is extended to the Divine Family which is understood as a natural extension of the concept of an indwelling God. The very understanding that God resides within me makes me divine and worthy of respect. It also inspires the view that God or divinity is everywhere, present in all living things, and therefore all should be treated with respect and devotion. Thus, the concept of an indwelling God motivates people to care for the welfare of others.

== Practices ==
=== Listening to Pravachana ===
Swadhyay practitioners listen to the pravachana (discourses) on the Bhagavat Gita, Upanishads, or Ved mantra via audio or video of Pandurang Shastri Athavale or "Dada".

=== Shramabhakti ===
Shramabhakti is a practice of using labor and time towards the creation of impersonal wealth for God and thus society.

=== Bhaktipheri ===
Bhaktiperi or spiritual travel is a practice within the Swadhyay Movement wherein an individual travels as a method of self-reflection and personal development. In the Indian context, bhaktiperi has the specific connotation of traveling to villages. Athavale first started Bhaktiperi with by visiting the villages surrounding Bombay. Bhaktiperi was from the outset of Athavale's mission one of primary pursuits of swadhyaya villages. Bhaktiperi, along with pilgrimage and discussion groups, is now overseen by the Sanskriti Vistarak Sangh.

=== Mantradaha pita ===
Mantradaha pita is one of the most common practices in the Swadhyay Movement. It is a daily gathering of the family for prayer in the morning or evening.

== Activities and Prayogs (Experiments) ==
Every activity in Swadhyay Parivar is based on Devotion, with a purpose to lift myself spiritually and to take me one step closer to God. Along with actively living Swadhyay principles in his daily life, Dada has been giving his discourses since 1942 to bring spirituality out in the common man. But instead of playing the role of teacher or preacher, he always became part of all and went to the same level of a common man, worked with all as a divine brother, and brought oneness in everyone who came into touch with him The understanding of indwelling God imbibed into his followers (known and referred as Swadhyayees) by Rev. Dada motivated them to willingly, knowingly and lovingly offer their efficiency, skill, and toil at the feet of God out of gratitude and reverence, which is a true expression of Devotion. The concept of Devotion has two important aspects: one self-exploration with a view to coming closer to God and two an active/creative principle of devotion to promote communal good. Through a series of Practical steps and programs, the awareness that the self is the abode of the Divine is facilitated.

In addition, he started many social experiments (Prayogs) to bring man closer to man and all people closer to God. These prayogs were rooted in the concept bhakti (devotion.) The prayogs were seen as an expression of bhakti that was not limited to going to a temple, praying at one's home, or donating money in the name of God. The practice of prayogs included offering one's time and effort to God. The by-product of these prayogs resulted in an alternative society where the other is not another, but he is my divine brother.

Prayogs (प्रयोग) (Social Experiments) by Swadhyaya Parivar

- Trikal Sandhya - Remembering God at the most important times in our life when God comes to gift us, three times a day: 1) morning (when we get up) recollection is gifted; 2) (when we have our food) digestion is gifted; and 3) (at night while sleeping) peace is gifted by God.
- Yuva/Yuvati Kendra (Previously known as DBT - Divine Brain Trust) - Youth gatherings to discuss modern-day issues for ages 16 to 30.
- Bal Sanskar Kendra (BSK) - Sessions for kids between ages 7 to 15, learn verses from scriptures and stories from History, Puranas, and other texts.
- Swadhyaya Kendra - Meeting once a week to learn about Hindu Scriptures and listen to discourses given by Dada.
- Bhavpheri/Bhaktipheri - Selflessly and devotionally traveling to meet, work and help the well-being of community partners. Bhavpheri is usually more local, whereas Bhaktipheri may involve traveling further into rural areas or places where local Bhavpheri does not happen.
- Vruksha Mandir - Where villages have a collective garden or orchard and members, generally from Amrutalayam villages, come and help in the name of god. It incorporates seeing God residing in nature, usually through trees (Vruksha) in this method.
- Madhav Vrund - A way for people who cannot access a Vruksha Mandir to respect and bond with nature; involves having plants in the house, keeping good care of them as a family, and reciting stotras like the Narayana Upanishad while watering the plant.
- Yogeshwar Krishi - Where farmers would meet once a month and farm in the name of God. If money is made in the process, it is considered God's and is used for village welfare or given to those who need it most at the time. Based on the Shrimad Bhagavad Gita: स्वकर्मणातमभ्यचर्य.
- ShriDarshanam- 9 Amritalayala's together make one ShriDarshanam.
- Matsyagandha - Where fishermen would meet once a month and fish in the name of God. Again, money made is God's and used for good works. Based on the Shrimad Bhagavad Gita: स्वकर्मणातमभ्यचर्य.
- Patanjali Chikitsalay - Where doctors would go to various parts of India and give their efficiency by treating their brothers and sisters. Based on the Shrimad Bhagavad Gita: स्वकर्मणातमभ्यचर्य.
- Loknath Amrutalayam- ALl the people of that respective village people are Swadhyay members and respect and care for each other. In the evening, everyone gets together to do Kutumba Prarthana (prayer as a family) together in this Amrutalayam.
- Hira Mandir - The same idea as Matsyagandha and Yogeshwar Krushi, but with mineral miners and polishers.

== Awards ==
- Pandurang Shastri Athavale received several awards and honors throughout his lifetime, recognizing his contributions to spirituality, social welfare, and community development. Some of the notable awards include:
- Templeton Prize for Progress in Religion (1997): Awarded for his efforts in fostering interfaith dialogue, spiritual enlightenment, and social harmony.
  - Dr. Betty Unterberger recognized Swadhyay movement and nominated for this prize.
- Ramon Magsaysay Award for Community Leadership (1996): Recognized for his outstanding contributions to community development, grassroots empowerment, and social transformation.
- Dnyaneshwara World Peace Prize (1997): Honored for his advocacy of peace, non-violence, and spiritual wisdom in fostering global harmony and understanding.
- These awards highlight Pandurang Shastri Athavale's impact and influence as a spiritual leader, social reformer, and advocate for positive change in society.

== See also ==
- Pandurang Shastri Athavale
- Svādhyāya
- Devotional Associates of Yogeshwar USA
