= Teams4u =

UK-based international development charity

Teams4U
- Formation: 2006
- Founder: Dave Cooke
- Type: Charity
- Registration no.: 1114131
- Headquarters: Wrexham, Wales
- Website: www.teams4u.com

Teams4U is a UK-based international development charity that works to improve the lives of vulnerable children, families, and communities in some of the world's most disadvantaged regions. Founded in 2006 by Dave Cooke, the creator of the original Operation Christmas Child shoebox appeal, Teams4U delivers practical aid and sustainable development projects in countries including Uganda, Sierra Leone, Romania, Bosnia, Moldova, Ukraine, Georgia, and Belarus.

== History ==
Teams4U was established in 2006 in Wrexham, Wales, by humanitarian Dave Cooke. After decades of experience working with disadvantaged communities through initiatives like Operation Christmas Child, Cooke sought to create an organisation that empowered local communities through practical interventions and sustainable programs.

Initially focusing on wider community needs, including access to clean water, healthcare, education, menstrual hygiene, and vocational training. Teams4U started distributing Christmas gift boxes to children in Eastern Europe, following requests from supporters of other shoebox appeals.

== Programmes ==
=== Shoebox appeal ===
The charity’s most recognised annual initiative involves sending thousands of shoeboxes filled with toys, toiletries, and school supplies to children in Eastern Europe and Africa. Volunteers from the UK help collect, sort, and distribute these boxes every Christmas season.

=== Menstrual hygiene programme ===
Teams4U runs education sessions and distributes reusable sanitary pads to girls in Uganda and Sierra Leone. The initiative aims to reduce school absenteeism and combat stigma around menstruation.

=== Clean water and sanitation ===
The organisation funds the drilling of boreholes and construction of latrines in remote communities, significantly improving health outcomes and reducing waterborne diseases.

=== Education and vocational training ===
Teams4U supports schools, orphanages, and vocational centres, providing resources, training, and infrastructure improvements. Programmes include teacher training, literacy initiatives, and skills-based workshops.

=== Ukraine aid and summer camps ===
Since the 2014 Ukraine crisis and during the 2022 invasion, Teams4U has delivered extensive humanitarian aid to war-affected regions of Ukraine. The charity has also run annual summer sports camps for orphans and vulnerable children in Ukraine, providing educational activities, sport, and psychosocial support. In addition, Teams4U has partnered with Ukrainian orphanages to deliver ongoing aid, resources, and volunteer support.

== Ambassadors ==
British actress and CBeebies presenter Gemma Hunt was announced as a charity ambassador for Teams4U in 2023.

== Notable events ==
- 2020: During the COVID-19 pandemic, Teams4U adapted its programmes to include the distribution of hygiene kits and health awareness campaigns in its partner communities.
- Annual Gala Dinners and Fundraisers: Held in Wrexham and other UK towns to raise awareness and funds for the charity’s international projects.
- 2022–2025: Delivered humanitarian aid and support to communities and orphanages in war-torn Ukraine.
