= Jakob Jensen =

Jakob Jensen may refer to:

- Bernhard Jensen (full name Jakob Bernhard Christian Jensen, often known as Jakob Jensen), Danish Olympic flatwater canoeist
- Jakob Jensen (politician) (1858-1942), Danish politician
- Jakob Green Jensen (born 1982), Danish handball player
- Jacob Jensen (born 1926), Danish industrial designer
- Jacob Jensen (politician), Danish politician
- Jakob Precht Jensen, Danish sailor

== See also ==
- Timothy Jacob Jensen (born 1962), Danish industrial designer
