= The Big Gay Sketch Show =

American sketch comedy TV program

- Created by: Rosie O'Donnell
- Directed by: Amanda Bearse
- Starring: Julie Goldman; Stephen Guarino; Jonny McGovern; Kate McKinnon; Nicol Paone; Paolo Andino; Colman Domingo
- Country of origin: United States
- Original language: English
- No. of seasons: 3
- No. of episodes: 22

Production
- Executive producer: Rosie O'Donnell
- Production company: Oh Really! Productions

Original release
- Network: Logo TV
- Release: August 6, 2006 – June 15, 2010

The Big Gay Sketch Show is an LGBT-themed sketch comedy program that debuted on Logo on April 24, 2007. The series was produced by Rosie O'Donnell and directed by Amanda Bearse. The program was originally titled The Big Gay Show, but was renamed during production. As the name indicates, the show features comedy sketches with gay themes or a gay twist. Sketch topics include parodies of old sitcoms like The Honeymooners and The Facts of Life under the Nick at Nite-parodying heading "Logo at Nite", a lesbian speed dating session, and an extended send-up of Broadway legend Elaine Stritch working as a Wal-Mart greeter, among other decidedly un-glamorous jobs.

Logo produced a second season of the series. Paolo Andino and Colman Domingo joined the cast (replacing Michael Serrato and Dion Flynn). Season 2 premiered on February 5, 2008.

Production on the third and final season began in March 2009, with Erica Ash no longer being part of the cast. In 2009, Logo conducted a search for new cast members. The result, entitled "The Big Gay Casting Competition", was limited to an online talent search, in which videos by contestants were uploaded to logoonline.com and voted on by site visitors. The winner, Wil Heuser, was a former American Idol contestant and Big Brother houseguest (season 14), and only appeared in one episode of the series as an extra. The final season premiered in April 2010.

== Cast ==
Cast Member	Season		
Cast Member	1	2	3
Julie Goldman	Main	Main	Main
Stephen Guarino	Main	Main	Main
Jonny McGovern	Main	Main	Main
Kate McKinnon	Main	Main	Main
Nicol Paone	Main	Main	Main
Erica Ash	Main	Main	
Dion Flynn	Main		
Michael Serrato	Main		
Paolo Andino		Main	Main
Colman Domingo		Main	Main

== Recurring characters and sketches ==
Recurring original BGSS characters include:

- Gay Werewolf (McGovern), a straight man who turns gay - and hairy - under the light of a full moon.
- Svetlana (Guarino), an ex-KGB secret agent and chorus dancer who practices her Soviet brand of martial arts as a means to stardom.
- Fitzwilliam (McKinnon), a gender-non-conforming English teen desperate to obtain a vagina. Sketches also include their father (McGovern).
- Steven, a large man also known as "Waffles" (McGovern). This character originated on McGovern's podcast, Gay Pimpin' with Jonny McGovern.
- Ron Odyssey, a frustrating flamboyant gay male receptionist (Guarino) who gives customers / patients a difficult time.
- Chocolate Puddin', a transgender sex worker. Puddin' originated in McGovern's stage show, "Dirty Stuff".
- Naldo (Andino), a Latino worker, who moves items (e.g. packages, luggage, furniture) in an explicit, sexual manner, unknown to him, exciting his gay male clientele.

Recurring celebrity impersonations include:

- Maya Angelou (Domingo), who reads sexually explicit posts from Craigslist.
- Antonio Banderas (Andino)
- Liza Minnelli (Goldman)
- Elaine Stritch (Paone), who appears performing a series of menial jobs like Wal-Mart greeter, airport luggage inspector, and the like.
- Barbara Walters (McKinnon), appears in "The View" sketches.

== Critical reception ==
- Variety: "[G]ay or straight, the audience has too many options to rely on mediocrity, which is why this exercise would seem a whole lot bigger and gayer if it was just a bit funnier."
- AfterEllen.com (owned by Logo): "BGSS faces inevitable comparisons to mainstream sketch shows like NBC's long-running Saturday Night Live and Fox's Mad TV and In Living Color. The success of SNL has hinged on the ability of its most talented cast members to develop memorable recurring characters. Similarly, the strength of both Mad TV and In Living Color is in the willingness of each to "go there" with the sort of sociopolitical humor that the modern incarnation of SNL (save for its brief and brilliant Tina Fey era) usually avoids... With its cast of mostly queer performers and its residence on a gay network, BGSS has a unique opportunity to do both of those things well. If the first two episodes are any indication, it looks promising."
- The Soup: Host Joel McHale commented unfavorably during the April 24, 2007, episode about BGSG's opening sketch, "Pocket Gay Friend", citing its similarity to The Soup's "Little Gay" recurring character that had debuted a year earlier and jokingly threatening a lawsuit.
- AfterElton.com (owned by Logo): "I was pleasantly surprised to find that The Big Gay Sketch Show demonstrates definite promise....this is pretty standard sketch comedy, save a few more gay characters peppered in and some humor based around gay relationships. And to be honest, the skits that had little to do with gayness were often much funnier than the ones that lampooned gay life....if Big Gay focuses on developing great characters and skits that don't get bogged down in the concept, the show could become a solid hit."

== Legacy ==
Despite producing only 22 episodes across three seasons on Logo TV—roughly equivalent to a single season of mainstream sketch programs like Saturday Night Live, MADtv, or The Kids in the Hall—The Big Gay Sketch Show is recognized as an important early showcase for LGBTQ performers, several of whom achieved significantly higher-profile careers in mainstream entertainment.

Kate McKinnon became the series' most prominent alumna, joining Saturday Night Live in 2012 as the show's first openly lesbian cast member. Media profiles frequently cite The Big Gay Sketch Show as an early incubator for her style of queer sketch comedy that later reached a much larger audience.

Colman Domingo leveraged his ensemble experience into acclaimed dramatic roles, including Victor Strand on AMC's Fear the Walking Dead and film performances in Ma Rainey's Black Bottom, Zola, and Rustin (2023), for which he received an Academy Award nomination for Best Actor.

Erica Ash transitioned to series regular roles on Starz's Survivor's Remorse (2014–2017) and BET's In Contempt (2018), with obituaries following her 2024 death crediting The Big Gay Sketch Show and MADtv as her breakout platforms.

Stephen Guarino became known for recurring roles on ABC's Happy Endings (as Derrick), NBC's Marry Me, and ABC's Dr. Ken, before landing a series regular role as comic Sully Patterson on Showtime's I'm Dying Up Here.

Other cast members sustained careers within queer media and comedy. Julie Goldman became a fixture on Bravo as co-host of The People's Couch (2013–2015) and the Vanderpump Rules After Show, and co-created the political satire podcast Dumb Gay Politics.

Jonny McGovern transitioned to hosting the long-running web series Hey Qween! (2014–present, nine seasons on WOW Presents Plus) and reality series GoGo for the Gold (2022–), while continuing his music career with viral hits and the podcast Gay Pimpin' and Jonny McGovern is Gay AF.

Michael Serrato appeared in the queer indie film Eating Out 2: Sloppy Seconds (2006) before shifting to producing and directing, including work on Drag Me to Dinner and drag culture content.

The sustained visibility of the cast—particularly McKinnon and Domingo's mainstream breakthroughs—has cemented The Big Gay Sketch Show's reputation as a launchpad for LGBTQ talent, even as Logo TV itself has diminished in prominence.
