= Louise Gade =

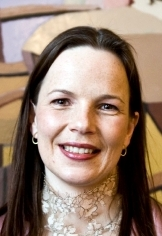

Mayor of Aarhus
- In office 2002–2005
- Preceded by: Flemming Knudsen
- Succeeded by: Nicolai Wammen

Personal details
- Born: 15 June 1972 (age 52); Thyborøn, Denmark
- Political party: Venstre

Louise Gade (born 15 June 1972, in Thyborøn) is a Danish cand.jur., president of Aarhus VIA University College and former mayor of Aarhus, Denmark.

Louise Gade is the daughter of Harry Gade and Anna-Marie Gade. She was a student of Struer Gymnasium (Struer Highschool) in 1991, after which she moved to Aarhus to study law. During her studies she became a member of the national board of Danmarks Liberale Studerende. In I 1997/1998 she obtained a degree as cand.jur. from Aarhus Universitet. From July 1997 to January 2002 she worked as a lawyer at the law firm Lokdam, Kjellund & Partnere in Århus. In 2001 she married Ulrik G. Westring.

Louise Gade was a member of Aarhus City Council from 1994 and in 1995–1998 she was the president of the city council group of Venstre. From 1998 she was a member of Økonomiudvalget (Board of Economy). Her political career culminated in 2002 when she became the first female and non-social democratic mayor of Aarhus. In 2005 Venstre lost the election and Louise Gade stopped as mayor although she received a record 42.697 personal votes. In 2006 she became a member of the Magistrate department for Children and Youth.

In 2008 Gade announced she would not run for another term. In 2009 Gade left Aarhus city council and became vice-president for human resources at Aarhus University and in 2015 she became president of VIA University College.

== See also ==
- List of mayors of Aarhus
