= Jonny McGovern =

American singer-songwriter (born 1976)

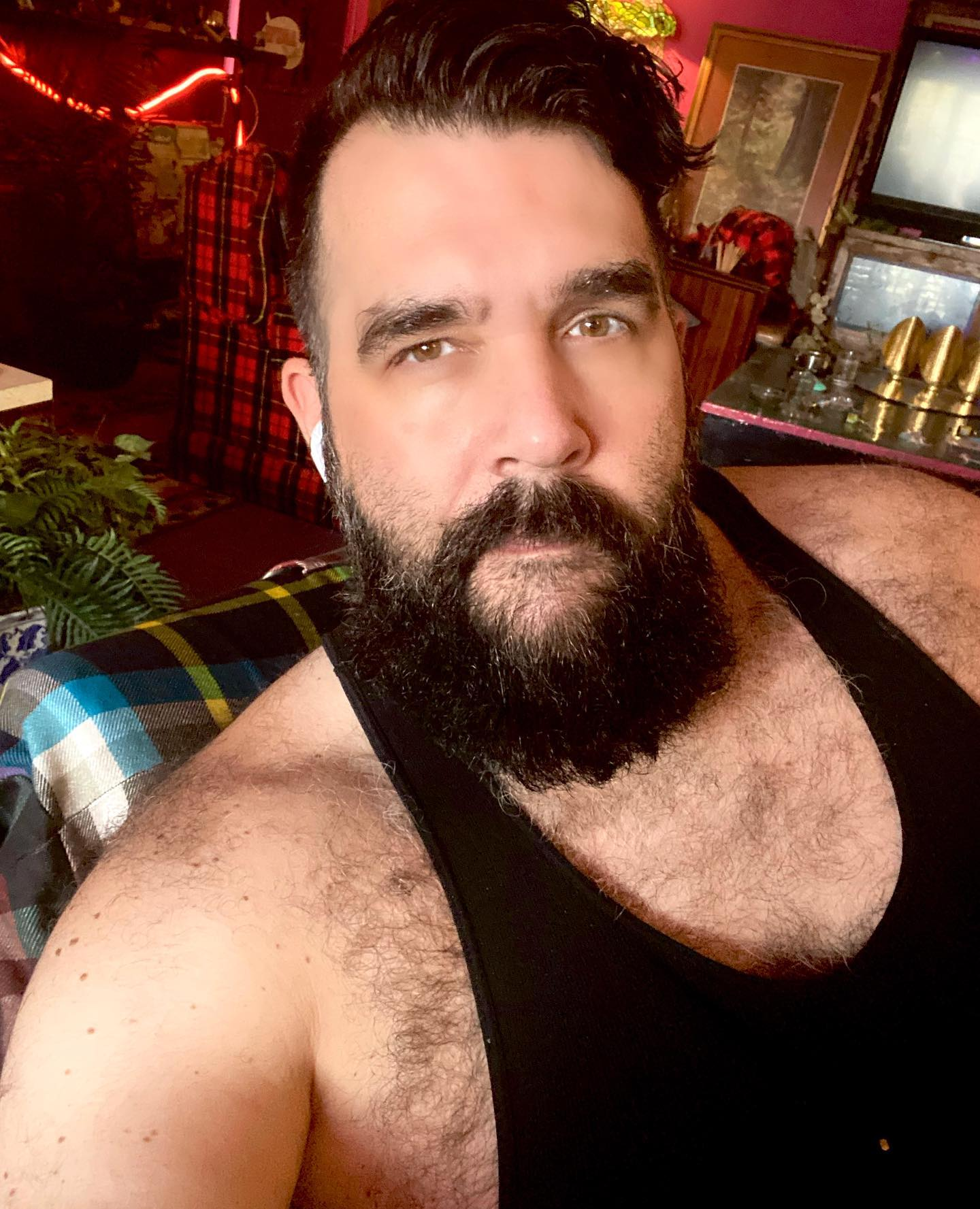
- McGovern in January 2022

Background information
- Born: July 12, 1976 (age 50)
- Origin: Brooklyn, New York, U.S.
- Genres: House, dance
- Occupations: Stand-up comedian, actor, musician, podcaster
- Years active: 1998–present
- Label: Gay/Nerd Music
- Website: www.GayPimp.com

Jonny McGovern (born July 12, 1976) is an American stand-up comedian, actor, musician, songwriter, and podcaster. He has written the lyrics for many of his own songs, and recorded three comedy/dance-pop albums (including some under his alter-ego, The Gay Pimp). On television, McGovern initially appeared as a cast member of Logo's late-night comedy sketch show, The Big Gay Sketch Show (2011), and has hosted the popular YouTube talk show Hey Qween! (2014–present) for nine seasons. He has hosted GoGo for the Gold, a reality competition series based on go-go dance performers, since 2022.

== Early life and education ==
Jonny McGovern was born to Mary McGovern and Rob Gutowski in Brooklyn, New York. His parents traveled often, and McGovern grew up primarily in Egypt and Thailand. McGovern later returned to the United States to study acting at Boston University, where he earned a BFA. He is openly gay.

== Career ==
=== Early work and The Gay Pimp ===
McGovern stated that he was inspired to create his signature comedic character, The Gay Pimp, after listening to rap songs and interviews by Eminem. McGovern has said,

It started off with Eminem. I was appalled by him ripping on fags and talking mad shit. People were protesting, but how could you protest a pop star? I figured my best way of protesting was to write a big, flashy, glamorous, funny show… called The Wrong Fag to Fuck With: The Gay Pimp vs. Eminem. It was where the Gay Pimp was a pop star/superhero who came out at the MTV awards to battle Eminem. Of course it did end with Eminem getting it up the butt and being humiliated while all the gay teens were set free.

After the songs from the show began to get heavy rotation in New York City nightclubs, McGovern was approached about making a music video for one of his songs, "Soccer Practice." The single gained further prominence when it was featured in the HBO drama True Blood during season one. Additionally, "Soccer Practice" appeared in the background of a bar scene in the twelfth episode of season three of Queer as Folk.

The success of the single garnered attention for McGovern, and he contributed commentary on a variety of VH1 shows (such as Best Week Ever, Totally Gay, and 40 Dumbest Celebrity Quotes) as well as earned a slot on Comedy Central's all-gay comedy show Out on the Edge, hosted by Alan Cumming.

=== Television ===
McGovern appeared on Logo's sketch comedy series The Big Gay Sketch Show as a cast member during its run from 2006 to 2010.

=== Hey Qween! ===
In 2014, McGovern created and began hosting Hey Qween!, a YouTube talk show centered on long-form, unscripted interviews with drag performers, musicians, actors, adult film performers, and other figures within LGBTQ+ entertainment and culture. From the series' debut in 2014 through mid-2020, Hey Qween! was co-hosted by drag performer and singer Lady Red Couture (born Kareemia Baines). Lady Red Couture was a central on-screen presence whose comedic interjections and improvisations—including singing "Hey queen, hey queen" during episode closings—became iconic elements of the show's format. Her rapport with McGovern and close friendship were frequently cited by critics as core to the show's appeal. As a tribute following her death from complications related to cyclic vomiting syndrome on July 25, 2020, McGovern released the three-track EP Flowers (Songs to Lady Red) in November 2020, produced by Adam Joseph.

Following Lady Red Couture's death, Hey Qween! entered a hiatus period before being revived in January 2024 on WOW Presents Plus as an official companion series to RuPaul's Drag Race season 16, featuring post-elimination interviews with contestants.

=== GoGo for the Gold ===
McGovern created and hosts GoGo for the Gold, a reality competition series on OUTtv featuring 12 go-go dancers competing weekly for a $10,000 cash prize and the title "America's #1 Champion Gogo Superstar Star." Developed in collaboration with veteran go-go dancer and lead judge Greg McKeon, the series premiered on May 13, 2022, on OUTtv platforms including OUTtv.com, Apple TV Channel, Roku Channel (U.S.), Prime Video Channel (Canada/Australia), and international partners Froot.tv (UK/Ireland) and Ultraview (South Africa).

The series emphasizes go-go dancing as a distinct performance tradition within LGBTQ+ nightlife culture. Judges score contestants across four categories—Fantasy (costume/presentation), Body (physicality/stage presence), Dance (choreography/skill), and Individuality (personality/charisma)—with the judging panel featuring McKeon, Adrian Hart, Michael Volkar, and Jojo Guadagno ("Jojo Guadz"), along with guest judges such as fashion designer Andrew Christian.

Season 1 (May–June 2022) featured contestants including Amaya Jahmeal (AJ), Bryant Santos, Eddie Danger, Gamaliel Baez (Gamma), Ken X.Y., Max Adonis, Paulo Batista, Randy Boo, Rico TV, Steven, Tony DeSantiago, and Zaddy, representing diverse body types and identities from "traditional masculine hunks" to bears, twinks, and at least one trans man. The season aired weekly beginning May 13, 2022, concluding with a finale episode on June 24, 2022.

Season 2 (June–August 2023) introduced a new ensemble of twelve dancers: Ace Wild, Gabe the Babe, Jkab, Johnny Moon, Johnny Cakez, Judas King, King Dwarf, Kirby LaBrea, Làszlò Major, Mochila, Peter Apollo, and additional contestants. The second season premiered on June 13, 2023, with episodes airing weekly through August 3, 2023. The $10,000 season prize was sponsored by SCRUFF dating app.

McGovern and McKeon positioned GoGo for the Gold as elevating a performance tradition historically underrepresented in mainstream LGBTQ+ entertainment, contrasting with the mainstream success of drag-focused competition formats. The series received a 6.9/10 rating on IMDb and has been available across multiple streaming platforms globally.

=== Music career and collaborations ===
Beyond his television work, McGovern's music career has continued to evolve. In the 2020s, his earlier single "Man Areas" experienced renewed popularity as a recurring sound on TikTok, introducing his work to new audiences. In 2024, McGovern released the single "Bussy" from his Man Areas album, produced by Adam Joseph and shot by Studio Boman, with multiple dancers from GoGo for the Gold contributing to user-generated videos and remixes of the track. Several cast members have also pursued content creation on OnlyFans, following the model established by co-creator Greg McKeon, who is among the platform's top earners.

=== Podcasting ===
McGovern's career in podcasting spans two decades and represents a pioneering role in LGBTQ+ digital media. Gay Pimpin' with Jonny McGovern, which began on January 16, 2006, was the first gay podcast to crack the iTunes top 10 charts. The bi-weekly show was originally based in New York City and featured co-hosts Linda James (a transgender Team PIMP member) and Martín Beauchamp ("Straighty Martín"), along with recurring guests including Julie Goldman (McGovern's co-star from The Big Gay Sketch Show), Calpernia Addams, Brandy Howard, and Adam Joseph, who would later become a regular collaborator on McGovern's television and music projects. The podcast aired episodes featuring notable guests such as RuPaul, Kevin Aviance, drag legend Martha Wash, and Junior Vasquez.

McGovern announced the podcast's hiatus on the January 11, 2010 episode, citing his relocation to Los Angeles and his co-hosts' desire to focus on their families. He subsequently re-released earlier episodes and began recording occasional updates. On September 1, 2010, McGovern relaunched the podcast from Los Angeles, and in late 2012 introduced "Mixtape Editions" featuring curated music from regular and semi-regular cast members. He continued a related podcast project titled Gayest of All Time with Jonny McGovern, which remains active on major podcast platforms including Apple Podcasts, Spotify, and Amazon Music. For dedicated listeners, McGovern offers extended access through a Patreon subscription at patreon.com/gayestofalltime, where listeners can access personal stories, sex discussions, and commentary on popular culture, aliens, recipes, and designer goods.

In late 2023, McGovern launched a new podcast titled Jonny McGovern is GAY AF, positioning it as a space where "pop culture meets dirty gay stuff" and exploring topics such as LGBTQ+ relationships, sexual health, LGBTQ history (Hanky code, Mommy Dearest, Martha Wash, Damron Address-book Guide, Sylvester, Paris is Burning, Damron Guide), fashion (notably a International Male catalogues), television, OnlyFans content creators, and tabloid gossip. The podcast is available on Spotify, Apple Podcasts, and all major podcast platforms.

== Discography ==
Year	Tracks
2003	Dirty Gay Hits US Release Date: August 4, 2003
2006	Jonny McGovern Presents: This is NYC, Bitch! The East Village Mixtape US Release Date: November 28, 2006
2007	Gays Gone Wild US Release Date: May 9, 2007
2008	Keep It Faggity: The Gay Pimp Remix Project US Release Date: June 11, 2008
2008	Dirty Gay Christmas Single US Release Date: Late November 15, 2008
2009	Best of Gay Pimpin' volumes 1 & 2 US release date: January 30, 2009
2009	The East Village Mixtape Volume 2: The Legends Ball US Release Date: November 2009
2011	Songs about the Golden Girls: 1. Zbornak; 2. Blanche Devereaux; 3. Take Me To Saint Olaf (A Song for Rose)
2012	The Gayest of All Time
2020	Flowers (Songs to Lady Red)
Unreleased Tracks	Unreleased: 1. This is How We Do / We Run This (La'Mady Remix) - La'Mady; 2. Tranny Ladies - Jonny McGovern (Parody of Beyoncee's Single Ladies); 3. BJ Got Me Fallin in Love (Parody of Usher's DJ Got Us Fallin' in Love)

Note:

- In the twelfth episode of the third season of Queer as Folk, Soccer Practice can be seen and heard in the background of the bar scene at about 18 minutes into the episode.
- "Soccer Practice" is played in the HBO vampire series True Blood in the third episode of season one. McGovern mentioned it on his weekly podcast and says he highly approves.
- Artist and raconteur Robert W. Richards drew the album cover for Gays Gone Wild.
- The photographs used on Jonny McGovern's site and ReMix album where shot by Dick Mitchel.
- By June 2007, the song "Somethin' For The Fellas (That Like the Fellas)" had held the top spot on Logo's The Click List: Top 10 Videos for over 15 weeks
- The video for "Don't Fall in Love With a Homo (A Song for the Ladies)" was released on May 1, 2008, with 25,000 views in the first day. It eventually hit number 1 on Logo's Click List and stayed there for 6 weeks.
- McGovern's gay parody video of "Like A G6" with transgender diva Calpernia Addams called "Likin Big Dicks" had over 400,000 views, and a club remix was produced by NYC electro-group Naked Highway.
- McGovern's spoof of Duck Sauce's "Barbra Streisand" dance track entitled "Marla Gibbs" (honoring the star of 227) was mentioned several times by Andy Cohen on Bravo's Watch What Happens Live!
- He also has a web series "Celebrity Donkey Punch" which comes out bi monthly.
