= USRC Waterwitch =

USRC Waterwitch a sea going motor launch was used as the official boarding boat by the United States Customs Service and United States Revenue Cutter Service in Hawaii for 28 years between 1903 and 1931.

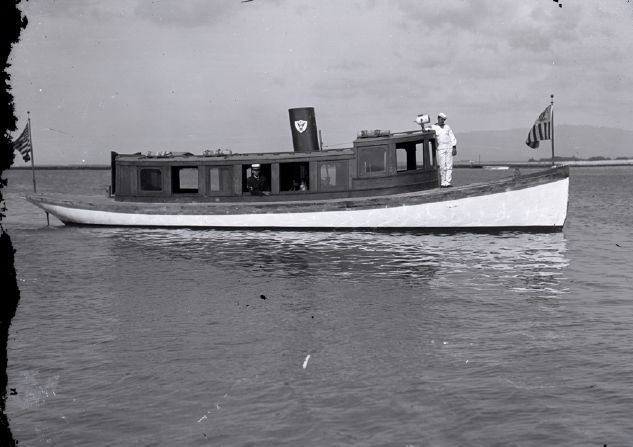
Waterwitch flying the colors of the USRC in her early days

The launch was built in 1900 by Peter Swanson, of Belvedere, California for Archie Young of the Von Hamm-Young company. She was 13 tons, and fifty feet in length, with a beam of nine feet, she drew five feet of water. Powered with a forty horsepower Union gas engine, she had electric lighting. She could carry twenty five to fifty passengers and crew. She was brought to Hawaii as deck cargo to Oʻahu, Hawaii in 1903 on the schooner Rosamond arriving on 3 October 1900.

Her maiden voyage took place on 6 October under the command of Commodore Archie Young, crewed by the Young Brothers, William and Herb, (no relation to Archie). On the trip the Waterwitch cruised round the Honolulu harbor and the southeast coast of the island, before making for Pearl and back, at speeds up to 12 knots.

The Young brothers, William and Herb, had arrived on the island in January 1900 and were immediately put into quarantine for three months, due to an outbreak of the Bubonic plague in Honolulu Unable to land they immediately took on jobs as crew freighting supplies among the islands. They put their hands to any task that presented itself including salvage and repair work while waiting clearance to land. Once allowed access to Honolulu, they took on employment by Archie in April 1900 .. They continued moonlighting with their various small ventures, mainly salvage and repair, towing garbage, delivering supplies to ships; by August that year they gained a passenger license and started a bumboat service using a small five horsepower launch the Billy around the harbor, for pleasure trips, and ferrying sailors back to their ships after shore leave. All these small jobs together would form the basis of the Young Bothers company founded that year, 1900. The business proved successful enough to bring two more brothers from San Diego into the business that year and the next. The brothers went onto buy the Waterwitch in 1902, and soon won a contract for to leasing her out as the official Customs and Immigration boarding boat for the island. They completely overhauled her for the job, taking out the six pullman berths on board.

In 1900 Honolulu boasted a population of 45,000, her harbor was only capable of servicing launches. Large vessels were obliged to anchor offshore and transfer passengers and goods by small launches and boats.

On 16 May 1901 the Waterwitch and the Fearless contested

== Customs service ==
The contract with the Customs Service began in May 1903 when she began to operate as a revenue and patrol boat taking officers out to arriving ships. She first flew the revenue flag in on 25 May, with Captain Herb Young at the helm. She would serve in this capacity for the next 28 years, often meeting up to 8 or 10 ships every day.

Her crew wore coats with two sets of buttons, one row for each, of the customs service and the other for the Immigration department.

Over the years her engine got upgraded several times, first to forty horsepower, later to fifty, and finally to one hundred. In the 1930s a member of the crew while cleaning the bilges one evening, struck a match to see if she was dry, the fumes set off an explosion, blowing her whistle onto the shore. Luckily he survived, though his arms were badly burnt.

In her last decade she acted as a pilot boat, and would on occasion take out greeters to incoming liners.

She was the first thing visitors by sea to Hawaii saw, passengers included Brother Bertram Bellinghausen who took several photographs of her in 1905. Brother Bertram's extensive photographic collection (1883-1905) is now in the Hawaii Museum. In 1937 she is much changed from her original design, sporting new lines and a new power plant, now capable of double her original speed.

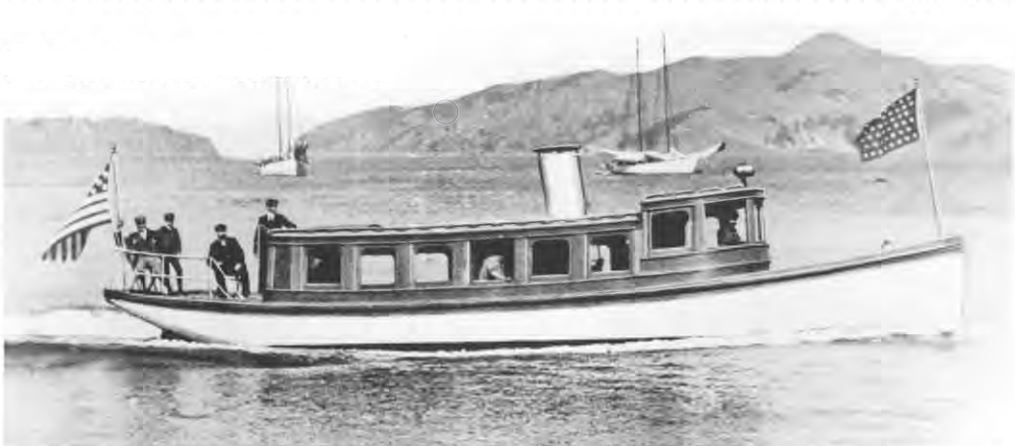
Waterwitch before her 1902 refit

== Contemporary vessels with the same name ==
Waterwitch yacht, of the Atlantic club, New York, owned by Commodore Banks, circa. 1895.
