= Erica Ash =

American actress (1977–2024)

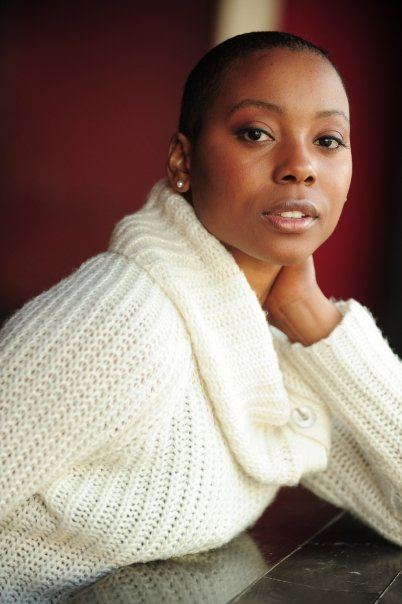
- Born: Erica Chantal Ash; September 19, 1977; Tallahassee, Florida, U.S.
- Died: July 28, 2024 (aged 46); Los Angeles, California, U.S.
- Education: Emory University
- Occupations: Actress; comedian; model; singer
- Years active: 1998–2024
- Website: ericaash.com

Erica Chantal Ash (September 19, 1977 – July 28, 2024) was an American actress, comedian, singer, and model. She was a cast member on the sketch comedy programs MADtv and The Big Gay Sketch Show, and she later starred in the Starz sitcom Survivor's Remorse.

== Early life and education ==
Ash was born in Tallahassee, Florida, on September 19, 1977, to Donald and Diann Ash. Her parents were both in the U.S. military, leading the family to relocate often, moving to Germany and other parts of the world. She attended a performing-arts school in Atlanta, Georgia, during her youth. Ash planned on becoming a doctor, graduating from Emory University, in Atlanta with a degree in pre-medicine, and prepared to attend medical school. However, after a trip to Japan, where she became a backup singer and a runway model, Ash decided to pursue a career in entertainment.

== Career ==
=== The Big Gay Sketch Show ===
In February 2006, Ash landed multiple job opportunities in Broadway shows like The Lion King and a two-week job in Germany. After returning from Germany, she successfully auditioned for the cable television comedy show The Big Gay Sketch Show. Ash was a cast member for two seasons. While she was a cast member, Ash had to split her time between the first season of the sketch show and The Lion King. Some of her characters included LaTanya, an uncouth, loudmouthed fitness instructor who teaches classes with a "Chicago-style" twist (i.e. Chicago-style yoga, Chicago-style Pilates).

=== MadTV ===
Ash joined the cast of MADtv in 2008 as a featured performer for the 14th season, along with Matt Braunger, Eric Price, and Lauren Pritchard. She became the fifth African-American female cast member in the show's history (Debra Wilson, Daniele Gaither, Nicole Randall Johnson, and Daheli Hall were the first four). Of the five female African-American cast members, Ash and Hall are the only two who were never promoted to the repertory cast due to seasons 13 and 14 being hit with budget cuts that didn't allow new cast members to stay long on the show. Ash remained a featured member of the MADtv cast during the show's 14th and final season on FOX. As of 2024, Ash is now the first (and, so far, only) deceased cast member of MADtv.

==== Characters ====
Character	Sketch	Season	Catch phrase
Cerise Muhammad	Daughter of Legions	14	"...and everything, so."

==== Impressions ====
Celebrity	Sketch	Season
Naomi Campbell	Various	14
Whoopi Goldberg	Various	14
Mo'Nique	Various	14
Lisa Leslie	Various	14
Raven-Symoné	Family Feud	14
Michelle Obama	Various	14

== Death ==
Ash died from breast cancer in Los Angeles on July 28, 2024, at the age of 46. Ash had first been diagnosed in 2008 and went into remission after treatment, though the cancer recurred in 2018.

== Filmography ==
Ash's acting career projects include:

=== Film appearances ===
Year	Title	Role	Notes
2001	Minna no Ie	Naomi	
2011	I Can Smoke?	Carmen	Short film
2013	Scary Movie 5	Kendra Brooks	
2014	Kristy	Nicole	
2015	Sister Code	Jamaya	
2016	Jean of the Joneses	Anne	
2017	All I Wish	Nikki	
2017	Miss Me This Christmas	Regina	
2018	Uncle Drew	Maya	
2019	Skin in the Game	Lena	
2021	Violet	Lila	
2021	Horror Noire	Shanita	
2021	The Big Bend	Georgia Talbott	
2022	Singleholic	Sarah Wilcox	
2023	We Have a Ghost	Melanie Presley	
2023	Outlaw Johnny Black	Bessie Lee	

=== Television appearances ===
Year	Title	Role	Total episodes	Notes
2006–2008	The Big Gay Sketch Show	Various Characters		Sketch Comedy
2008–2009	MadTV	Various Characters	12	Sketch Comedy
2009	Cold Case	Regina Reynolds	1	Drama
2012	American Judy	Maya		Television film
2013–2016	Real Husbands of Hollywood	Bridgette Hart	19	Recurring Role
2014–2017	Survivor's Remorse	Mary Charles "M-Chuck" Calloway	36	Main Role
2016	Hell's Kitchen	Herself	1	Dining Room Guest
2018	In Contempt	Gwen Sullivan	10	Main Role
2019	RuPaul's Drag Race All Stars	Herself		Guest Judge
2019	Legacies	Veronica Greasley	4	
2019; 2021	Family Reunion	Grace	3	
2020	Bless the Harts	Julie Vous Coucher (voice)	1	
2021	A Black Lady Sketch Show		1	
2021	Aquaman: King of Atlantis	Wendy (voice)	1	
2021	Sacrifice	Beverly Rucker	1	
2022	Unthinkably Good Things	Reesa		Television film
2024	Extended Family	Lydia	1	

=== Video games ===
Year	Title	Role	Notes
2002	Shenmue II	Additional Voices	Video game Xbox version
2002	DDRMAX Dance Dance Revolution 6thMix (PlayStation 2, Japan)	Singer (Kind Lady)	Video game
2002	DDRMAX2 Dance Dance Revolution 7thMix (PlayStation 2, Japan)	Singer (Kind Lady (interlude))	Video game
2003	DDRMAX2 Dance Dance Revolution (PlayStation 2, North America)	Singer (Forever Sunshine)	Video game
2003	Bloody Roar 4	Nagi Kirishima	Video game
