= Jakob Jensen (politician) =

Danish politician (1858–1942)

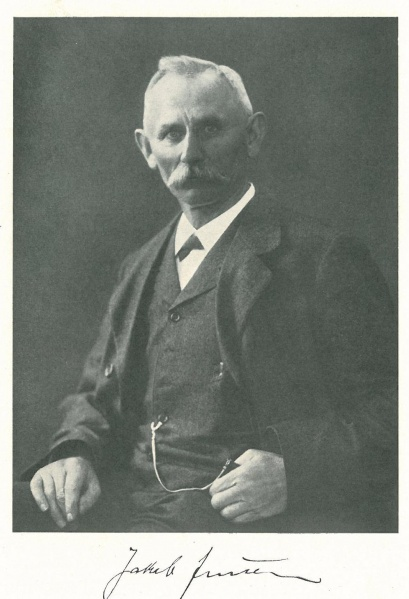
- Jakob Jensen (1858–1942)
- Born: 15 November 1858; Helgenæs, Denmark
- Died: 5 October 1942 (aged 83); Aarhus, Denmark
- Occupation: Politician

Jakob Jensen (15 November 1858 – 5 October 1942) was a Danish politician and the first elected mayor of Aarhus, Denmark. Jakob Jensen was born in Helgenæs on Djursland where he grew up on the family farm but he later moved to Aarhus where he worked as a mason and later as a politician.

He founded the local mason's union, was involved in numerous organizations and during his tenure as mayor he was instrumental in expanding the Port of Aarhus and getting the University of Aarhus established. Jakob Jensen was a member of the Danish Social Democratic Party.

== Public service ==
In the 1880s he became involved in the Social Democratic worker's movements in 1883 he helped establish Murernes Fagforening (Mason's Union) and from 1887 he functioned as the president of it. From 1894 he functioned as the spokesperson of business matters for Arbejdernes Forbrugsforening (Worker's Union of Consumers). In 1900 Jakob Jensen was elected to the City Council and in 1919 he became the first publicly elected mayor of the city. His primary focus in the council was in the areas of education and the municipally owned Port of Aarhus. During Jensen's tenure the elementary schools on Finsensgade, N.J. Fjords Gade, Samsøgade, Læssøesgade and Ingerslevs Boulevard were built and he was the primary driver behind Marselisborg Gymnasium and the location of Aarhus University. Jakob Jensen served as mayor for 13 years before he left office to Hans Peder Christensen.

Jakob Jensen was a strong opponent of public intoxication and workers spending their salaries in the nightlife instead of their families. He advocated for limiting permits and opening hours of bars and would famously show up in bars to personally stop people from drinking, if necessary with physical force.

== Depictions ==
Aarhus Yacht Harbor was inaugurated on 14 May 1933 and a memorial stone for Jakob Jensen was unveiled. The relief was made by the artist Jenny Salicath and the inscription reads "Borgmester Jakob Jensen. Medlem af Aarhus Havneudvalg 1900–1933" (English: Mayor Jakob Jensen. Member of Aarhus Harbor Commission 1900–1933). Elias Ølsgaard made a bust of Jakob Jensen which for many years stood in the great hall in the former Danish National Business Archives building on Vester Allé 12. In Aarhus City Hall hangs a portrait by the painter Julius Paulsen (1860–1940).

== See also ==
- List of mayors of Aarhus
