= Marselisborg Gymnasium =

Secondary school in Aarhus, Denmark

Coordinates: 56.82213°N 10.1224°E

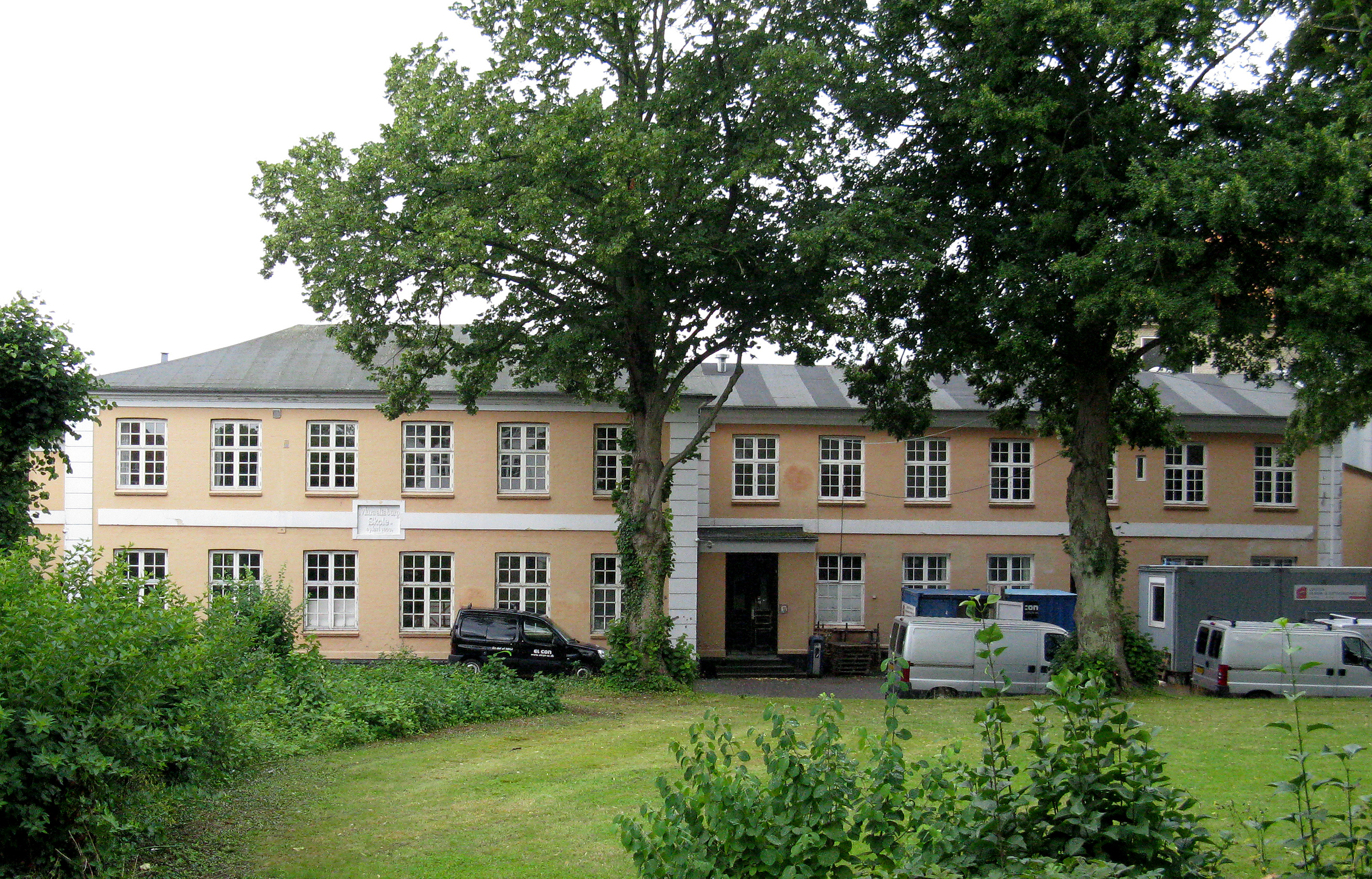
- Marselisborg Gymnasium
- Type: Secondary education
- Established: 1898
- Rector: Arvid Bech (2015)
- Students: 800 (2015)
- Location: Aarhus, Denmark
- Website: marselisborg-gym.dk

Marselisborg Gymnasium is a school of secondary education in Aarhus, Denmark. The school is a financially independent self-owning educational institution under the Danish state. The school offers the 3-year Matriculation examination (STX) programme within five main branches; natural sciences, social sciences, language, music and, since 2006, sports through a partnership with Team Danmark.

Marselisborg Gymnasium was founded in 1898 by Olaf Gudme under the name Marselisborg Boarding and Learned School. The school became a popular alternative to Aarhus Katedralskole and was first expanded in 1904. From 1916 the school became owned by Aarhus Municipality and in 1973 by Aarhus County. In the Danish Municipal Reform of 2007 the Danish counties were abolished and Marselisborg Gymnasium became independent and self-owning like most other Danish educational institutions.

== Notable graduates ==
- 1942 – Tage Skou-Hansen, writer
- 1957 – Jørgen Leth, writer
- 1958 – Kurt Thyboe, journalist, writer
- 1987 – Lars Hjortshøj, comedian
- 1990 – Nicolai Wammen, politician. Mayor of Aarhus and Minister of Parliament
- 2007 – Sara Petersen, athlete
