= Orla Hyllested =

Danish politician (1912–2000)

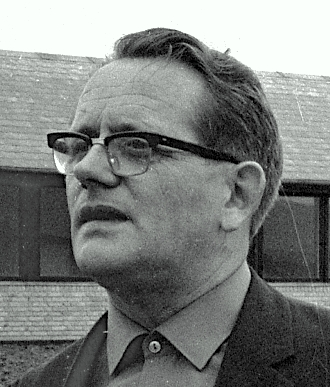
- Orla Hyllested in 1965
- Born: 4 August 1912; Aarhus, Denmark
- Died: 10 June 2000 (aged 87); Aarhus, Denmark
- Occupation: Politician

Orla Schartau Hyllested (4 August 1912 – 6 September 2000) was a Danish union representative, politician and mayor of Aarhus. Hyllested grew up in Aarhus in a working-class family and was a trained mason. Through his work he became involved in union work and later politics. He served as the mayor of Aarhus for 10 years between 1971 and 1981 for the Danish Social Democratic Party.

== Political career ==
From a young age Hyllested had to work to supplement the income in his family by delivering milk and later as the assistant in a barber shop. In his adult life he was trained as a mason and worked as such for a few years before he became involved in union work. Between 1935 and 1961 he was member of the board of the Aarhus Mason's Union (Murersvendenes Fagforening), from 1942 to 1946 he sat on the board of Faglig Ungdom and from 1945 he served on the board of the Arbejderens Fællesorganisation. In 1944 he became manager Fagorganisationernes Boligselskab and from 1954 he was hired permanently there as he had to give up the physically demanding mason job. In 1958 he was elected to the Aarhus City Council for the Social Democratic Party. In 1970 he became Councillor for social affairs and deputy mayor during the tenure of mayor Bernhardt Jensen. When Bernhard Jensen resigned his post in 1971 Orla Hyllested became mayor in his stead and remained on that post for 10 years.

In 1981, Aarhus suffered from unemployment and the aftermath of the 1979 energy crisis, and Hyllested decided not to run for mayor again. However, an anonymous person signed him up as an independent in an effort to split the Social Democratic vote. Orla Hyllested was forced to run newspaper ads asking people to vote for the Social Democratic Party.

== Public office ==
- 1957–1959 – Member of the school commission
- 1957–1959 – Member of the boards of Vorrevang, Læssøesgade and Christiansgade Schools
- 1958–1970 – Member of the technical committee
- 1958–2000 – Member of the board of Andelsselskabet Gudenåcentralen
- 1958–1959 – Member of the housing commission
- 1962–2000 – Member of the housing commission
- 1958–1962 – Member of the committee for cultural affairs
- 1958–1966 – Member of the housing assignment committee
- 1959–2000 – Member of the construction council
- 1959–1959 – Member of the Aarhus County school council
- 1959–1962 – Member of the board of Aarhus Natural History Museum
- 1962–1970 – Member of the economy committee
- 1962–2000 – Member of the vacation funds commission
- 1962–2000 – Member of the Dispositionsplan commission
- 1962–2000 – Member of the Aarhus County commission for intersections
- 1962–2000 – Representative for Jydsk Byplanråd
- 1962–2000 – Representative for Århus Renholdningsselskabet
- 1962–2000 – Representative for I/S Midtkraft
- 1962–2000 – Member of the Egnsplan commission
- 1962–2000 – Representative for Idrætsparken
- 1966–2000 – Member of the board of Aarhus Technical School
- 1966–2000 – Member of the board of Århusegnens Flyveplads
- 1966–2000 – Member of the harbor commission

Political offices
Preceded by Bernhardt Jensen	Mayor of Aarhus; 1971–1981	Succeeded by Thorkild Simonsen
