= Julie Goldman =

American comedian, actress and podcaster

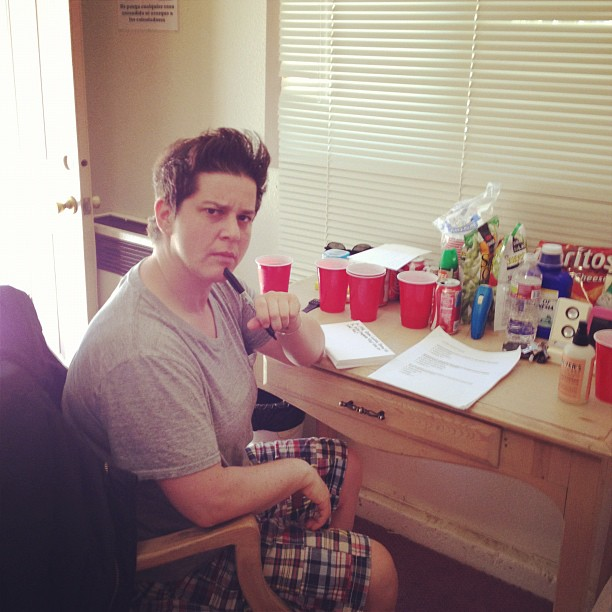
- Born: Boston, Massachusetts, U.S.
- Occupations: Actress, comedian, podcaster
- Years active: 2002–present

Julie Goldman is an American comedian, actress, and podcaster. She is best known for her work on Bravo’s The People’s Couch, and HBO’s Curb Your Enthusiasm. In 2016, she started a podcast with her comedy partner Brandy Howard, called Dumb Gay Politics, which recaps politics and reality TV.

== Early life and education ==
Goldman was born and raised in Boston. Her first stand-up performance was at The Comedy Connection in Boston at the age of 15. She attended Lexington High School and Emerson College.

== Career ==
Julie founded an all-women's stand-up and variety show called "OFFENSIVE WOMEN" and recruited Eve Ensler to sponsor their biggest show to date at The Zipper Theater in New York City. She starred on The Big Gay Sketch Show, a sketch comedy program on Logo TV.

Goldman is a frequent guest on Jonny McGovern's weekly podcast Gay Pimpin' with Jonny McGovern. In 2010 Goldman joined the cast of the podcast.

As well as featuring on Gay Pimpin' with Jonny McGovern, Goldman co-hosts Dumb, Gay Politics, a political comedy podcast, alongside writing partner Brandy Howard.

Goldman is raising money to produce Nicest Thing, a feature-length, lesbian romantic comedy that she co-wrote with Brandy Howard. Goldman and Howard are producing the movie with Amanda Bearse who is also slated to direct. Other attachments include Tammy Lynn Michaels, Guinevere Turner, Kate Clinton, Paul Vogt, Bryce Johnson and Kate McKinnon.

Julie Goldman and Brandy Howard co-host Julie & Brandy in Your Box Office, a webseries on lesbian website Autostraddle, in which they provide reviews and re-enactments of movies. In "In Your Box Office FOR REAL," Julie & Brandy go behind the scenes for events like The Michigan Womyn's Music Festival and The VH1 DO Something Awards, where Julie performed with Jane Lynch.

Goldman and Howard wrote for Joan Rivers on Fashion Police on E!. She also appeared as a contestant on the second season of RuPaul's Drag U during the summer of 2011.

== Filmography ==
=== Film ===
Year	Title	Role	Notes
2005	The D Word	Drea McClay	
2006	Mom	Linda	
2007	Out at the Wedding	Grace	
2012	Love or Whatever	Hazel Blue	
2014	Untold	Joey	
2018	Boy Band	Janet Pizza Woman	
2021	Untold: This is My Story	Joey	
2022	God Save the Queens	Charlie	

=== Television ===
Year	Title	Role	Notes
2002	The Sopranos	Saskia Kupferberg	Episode: "The Weight"
2006–2010	The Big Gay Sketch Show	Various	23 episodes
2011	Bones	Tina Winston	Episode: "The Change in the Game"
2012	Best Friends Forever	Lt. Rita Newby	Episode: "Put a Pin in It"
2012	The New Normal	Lesbian Mom	Episode: "Pilot"
2012	Weeds	Homeless Chris	Episode: "Threshold"
2012	DTLA	Gwen The Bouncer	Episode: "Pilot"
2013	Happy Endings	Bar Patron	Episode: "Ordinary Extraordinary Love"
2013	Roomies	Sam	5 episodes
2014	Murder in the First	Bailiff	Episode: "Pants on Fire"
2014	The Mindy Project	Deborah	Episode: "The Devil Wears Lands' End"
2014	Faking It	Ace	Episode: "Busted"
2016	Randall and Hilda Are Not a Couple	JoJo	Television film
2016	Angelino Heights	Jack	Episode: "Pilot"
2017	Curb Your Enthusiasm	Betty	Episode: "Foisted!"
2018	Hollywood Darlings	Julie	Episode: "Till Death Gets Me a Part"
2019	The Morning Show	Security Guard	Episode: "A Seat at the Table"
2020	Stumptown	Poppy Matthews	2 episodes
2021	Call Me Kat	Officer Martin	Episode: "Business Council"
2022	Dollface	Devin	Episode: "Molly"
2026	Ted	FedEx	Episode: "Susan is the New Black"
