= Steffen Bernhardt Jensen =

Danish journalist (1910–1978)

Bernhardt Jensen
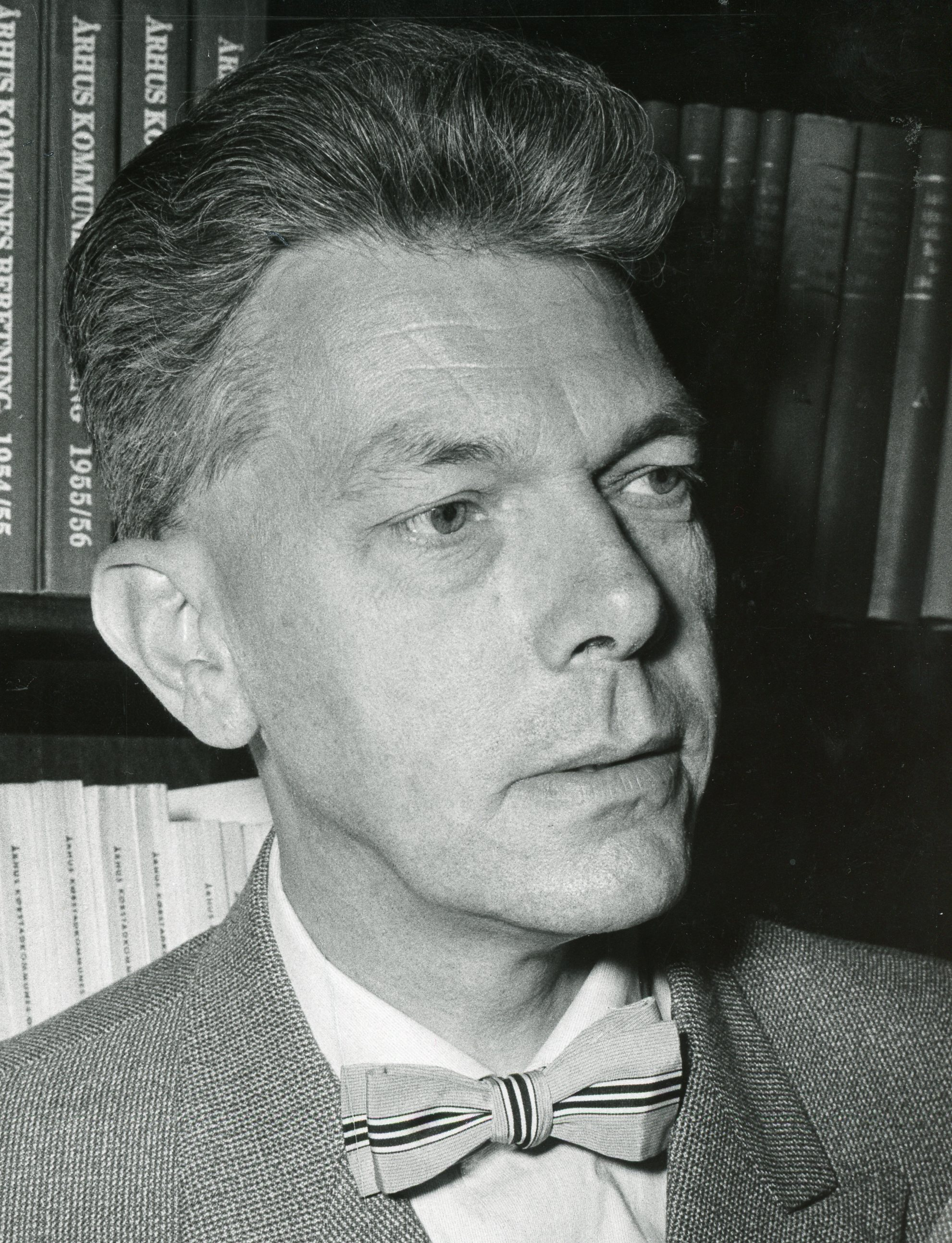
- Bernhardt Jensen in 1958
- Born: 13 April 1910; Aarhus, Denmark
- Died: 11 June 1978 (aged 68); Aarhus, Denmark
- Occupation: Politician

Steffen Bernhardt Jensen (13 April 1910 – 11 June 1978) was a Danish journalist, author, politician and Mayor of Aarhus from 1958 to 1971 for the Social Democratic Party. He was politically active from an early age and later worked as a journalist for several local left-leaning newspapers. During his tenure as mayor, he became known for his opposition to car traffic and he stopped several infrastructure projects that would have required large-scale demolitions of the historic inner city.

== Political career ==
Jensen started his political career early on and served on the board of Denmark's Socialdemocratic Youth from 1927 to 1932. During the same period he was active in antimilitaristic work and between 1929 and 1935 he was on the board of the national association of the organization Aldrig Mere Krig (Never more war). He remained opposed to militarism after the Danish Social Democratic Party changed course on the issue and he remained committed to it throughout his life.

He graduated from N. J. Fjordsgades Skole in 1927 and then started as an intern on the local newspaper Aarhus Venstreblad, associated with the Danish Social Liberal Party. He later became a journalist on the Social Democratic newspaper Demokraten where he covered a number of different topics. He first ran for Aarhus city council in 1941 as the 11th candidate on the social democratic list. Due to the occupation during the Second World War the election was postponed to 1943 when he was finally elected. In 1946, he was elected chairman and spokesperson of the social democratic group. He became a councilman for the 4th department of the magistrate, the department for schools and culture management, from 1 October 1950 and became mayor from 1 October 1958.

Jensen had great respect for the urban environment in Aarhus and was an ardent opponent of car traffic. He became famous for moving around the city on a bicycle after he abolished the mayor's car. He stopped plans to build roads through the historic city center, which would have demolished large parts of it. Instead, he worked actively to preserve historical buildings and neighborhoods. In the 1960s, Jensen worked to merge Aarhus Municipality with a number of smaller surrounding municipalities and it was successfully concluded in 1970. In 1971, he retired as mayor due to health problems and was replaced by Orla Hyllested.

== Author ==
Beyond his work as a journalist, Jensen was also known as a writer in other areas. During his youth, he published poems in the magazine Vild Hvede, although he later focused his efforts on local historical subjects. He wrote several works about local history including:

- Fra det glade Århus, 1963
- Som Århus morede sig, 1966
- Da Århus var Hollywood, 1969
- Marselisborgskovene, 1974 (with his brother Peder Jensen)
- Bernhardt Jensen beretter om Århus (posthumously published 1979)

== Honors ==
In 1978, Jensen was awarded an honorary degree at Aarhus University for his work in local history although he died the same year before he could officially receive it. The neighborhood Aarhus Docklands under development through the 2010s has a street named after Bernhard Jensen; the main street Bernhard Jensens Boulevard.

The local edition of Jyllandsposten recognized Jensen as "alle tiders aarhusianer" (All time Aarhusian), leading to a bipartisan committee collecting funds for a statue to be created by artist Jan Balling. The proposal was submitted to Aarhus City Council on 15 April 2009 and on 13 April 2010, on Jensen's 100th birthday, the statue "Manden med cyklen" (Man with bike) was unveiled on Åboulevarden where it overlooks the river and Immervad towards the Latin Quarter.

== See also ==
- List of mayors of Aarhus

Political offices
Preceded by Svend Unmack Larsen	Mayor of Aarhus; 1958–1971	Succeeded by Orla Hyllested
