= Liberal Students of Denmark =

Liberal Students of Denmark Danmarks Liberale Studerende
- Chairperson: Tej Friis Egefjord
- Treasurer: Lars S Andersen
- Founded: 14 November 1910
- Headquarters: Århus
- Ideology: Classical Liberalism
- Mother party: Venstre, Danmarks Liberale Parti
- International affiliation: International Federation of Liberal & Radical Youth (IFLRY)
- European affiliation: European Liberal Youth (LYMEC)
- Nordic affiliation: Nordic Liberal and Radical Youth (NLRU)
- Website: www.studliberal.dk

The Liberal Students of Denmark (Danish: Danmarks Liberale Studerende, often: DLS) is a political student organization, with chapters in the major Danish university cities of Copenhagen, Aarhus, Odense and Aalborg. It was founded 14 November 1910, making it one of Denmark's oldest student organizations. The organization's name has changed several times, and due to the autonomous status of the individual branches, some have traditionally preferred alternative names.

Originally named Studenterforeningens Venstre (1910–40), other names used were Venstres Studerende and Liberale Studerende i Danmark. The current name was introduced on 23 November 1968, replacing Liberale Studerende i Danmark, to avoid the abbreviation "LSD".

DLS published the magazine Minerva from 1932 to 1995. Publication was suspended on a few occasions, most importantly between 1943-45 when the editor worked for the illegal magazine, Budstikken Gaar. As of February 2008 DLS is once again publishing Minerva (4 issues a year).

== Affiliations ==
The founder and first President of Studenterforeningens Venstre, Aage Ludvig Holberg Elmquist, was in 1912 elected the first Vice President of Venstres Ungdom, thus forming a long-lasting alliance between the two organizations. Other former members include two cabinet ministers, Bertel Haarder and Ulla Tørnæs, and former Mayor of Århus, Louise Gade. DLS is associated with the Danish Liberal Party, Venstre and, internationally, with LYMEC.

== Leadership committee ==
President: Tej Friis Egefjord

Vice-president: Michelle Holst

Secretary General: Louise Hilligsøe

Treasurer: Lars S Andersen

International Officer: Tej Friis Egefjord
