= Robert Pierce =

American Baptist minister and charity founder (1914–1978)

Personal details
- Born: Robert Willard Pierce; October 8, 1914 Fort Dodge, Iowa, U.S.
- Died: September 6, 1978 (aged 63) Arcadia, California, U.S.
- Denomination: Baptist
- Spouse: Lorraine Pierce
- Occupation: Leader of World Vision International and Samaritan's Purse
- Education: Pasadena Nazarene College

Robert Pierce (October 8, 1914 – September 6, 1978) was an American Baptist minister and relief worker. He is best known as the founder of the international charity organizations World Vision International in 1950 and Samaritan's Purse in 1970.

== Early life and education ==
Pierce was born on October 8, 1914, in Fort Dodge, Iowa. He moved with his family to southern California in the mid-1920s. He attended Pasadena Nazarene College and studied for the ministry. From 1937 to 1940 he spent time traveling across California working as an evangelist. In 1940 he was ordained a Baptist minister and soon thereafter he became involved with the Los Angeles branch of the WWII-era Youth for Christ (YFC) movement.

== Ministry ==
During several visits in the late 1940s until the conclusion of the Chinese Civil War in 1950, Robert Pierce worked with the Youth for Christ, in a series of evangelical rallies held in China and witnessed the wartime destruction of hospitals, schools, and churches. On one trip, he met Tena Hoelkeboer, a missionary teacher, who presented him with a battered and abandoned child. Unable to care for the child herself, Tena asked Pierce, "What are you going to do about her?" Pierce gave the woman his last five dollars and agreed to send the same amount each month to help the woman care for the child.

He was deeply aroused by the wartime poverty and human suffering that he witnessed in both China and Korea and in 1950 he founded World Vision International, at least partly due to his associations with local pastors such as Korean Presbyterian minister Kyung-Chik Han.

In 1959 journalist Richard Gehman wrote that "[Pierce] cannot conceal his true emotions. He seems to me to be one of the few naturally, uncontrollably honest men I have ever met." Pastor Richard Halverson wrote that Pierce "prayed more earnestly and importunately than anyone else I have ever known. It was as though prayer burned within him. … Bob Pierce functioned from a broken heart."

Pierce was also a filmmaker and during his leadership World Vision used movies, shown mainly for church audiences, as the main marketing tool. Since in the worldview of Pierce Christianity was the only religion able to counter communism, these movies were full of anti-communist cold war rhetoric and promoted Christian missionizing as a way to counter communism. With the extensive use of movies as funding tool, Bob Pierce's World Vision had together with the Salvation Army a leading role in the development of the evangelical social action movie.

Pierce was a close friend to Abraham Vereide. Like other leading figures of World Vision, e.g. Richard Halverson, Senator Frank Carlson, or later Winston Weaver he was also involved in The Fellowship and the associated prayer breakfast movement founded by Vereide for which he worked during the 1950s as a field representative.

In 1967 he resigned from World Vision. In 1970, he founded the hunger relief organization that became the evangelical Christian organization Samaritan's Purse that was modeled after the early World Vision International.

== Illness and death ==
Pierce began having marital issues with his wife, and decided to "temporarily" move away from his family. Pierce was then diagnosed with blood cancer, which caused his wife, Lorraine, concern. In 1978, he reluctantly agreed to a last reunion with his family. Four days after the reunion, he died of leukemia.
