= Damron =

Damron is a surname. Notable people with the surname include:

- Dane Damron, American football player and coach
- Dick Damron (1934–2025), Canadian country music singer-songwriter
- J.R. Damron, American politician
- Mary Damron (1954–2024), American missionary
- Robert Damron (born 1972), American golfer
- Robert Damron (politician) (born 1954), American investment banker
