= Eiler Larsen =

"The Greeter" of Laguna Beach, California

- Larsen as seen on a Laguna Beach postcard c. 1960
- Born: March 27, 1890; Aarhus, Denmark
- Died: March 19, 1975 (aged 84); Capistrano Beach, Dana Point, California, U.S.
- Resting place: Los Angeles National Cemetery
- Other name: "The Greeter"
- Occupation: Vagabond
- Known for: Being the town greeter of Laguna Beach, California
- Relatives: Svend Unmack Larsen (brother)

Eiler Larsen (March 27, 1890 – March 19, 1975) was a Danish-born vagabond who was known as "The Greeter" of Laguna Beach, California. From the 1940s until the early 1970s, the shaggy-haired, heavily bearded Larsen grinning, waving, and booming "Halloo-oo-oo!" to visitors became a cultural icon for Laguna Beach tourists.

Larsen wandered in Europe, South America and across the United States before settling in Laguna at age 52. He worked as an occasional gardener, and adopted the daily habit of standing on a street corner to greet every car and passerby. Local patrons supported him with a rent-free room, free meals and other services. In 1964, Larsen was proclaimed Laguna's Official Greeter by the mayor. During his lifetime, Larsen was featured in paintings, postcards, photographs and sculptures.

== Early life ==
Eiler Unmack Larsen was born March 27, 1890, in Aarhus, Denmark, the son of L.M. Larsen and Thyra Vilhelmine Unmack. His father worked as manager of the city's poorhouse. His younger brother, Svend Unmack Larsen, said growing up among the poor was "this mixture of tragedy and baroque, macabre comedy" that gave him an early understanding of social problems and the dark sides of society. Svend Unmack Larsen went on to become the Justice Minister of Denmark and served as mayor of Aarhus from 1945 to 1958. Eiler Larsen left Denmark to pursue what he later described as "my mission of friendliness."

== Wanderlust ==
Larsen alternated between a series of odd jobs and wanderlust. According to newspaper accounts, Larsen went to Siberia at age 19 as a representative for a Danish butter exporter. After a brief stint of mandatory service in the Danish Army, Larsen traveled to South America and hiked through Argentina and Chile. He first arrived in the United States at New Orleans, Louisiana, aboard a ship from Chile on September 29, 1916. Larsen went to St. Peter, Minnesota, where he attended Gustavus Adolphus College for a year. During World War I, Larsen enlisted on January 14, 1918, and served with the United States Army 8th Infantry. According to Larsen, a leg injury he suffered from an artillery shell in France resulted in his lifelong need of a cane.

After returning to the United States, Larsen worked as a Wall Street messenger before wandering the eastern seaboard. He walked most of the Appalachian Trail from Maine to Georgia. For a time in the 1920s, he greeted people near the White House in Washington, D.C. In 1930, he worked as a caretaker in Putnam, New York. During the Great Depression, Larsen migrated to California where he picked fruit in the San Joaquin Valley and lived for a time in Colfax, California, and the San Francisco area.

== The Greeter ==
While living in San Francisco, Larsen was intrigued to hear about the Pageant of the Masters festival in the artist community of Laguna Beach. He came in the summer of 1938 and was cast as Judas in the presentation of Da Vinci's The Last Supper. He returned to portray the same role the next two years, then moved permanently to Laguna in 1942.

He supported himself with occasional jobs of gardening and at a pottery business. In spare moments, Larsen pursued his lifelong habit of choosing a vantage point and welcoming people. His usual spot in Laguna Beach was a busy junction at Forest Avenue and Coast Highway near the main beach. To every car and pedestrian that passed by, Larsen grinned, waved, pointed his wooden cane and shouted his catch phrases of "Hallooo!", "Delighted to see you!" or "Are you alive?!" The shaggy-haired and heavily bearded Larsen, usually dressed in a red shirt, slacks and sandals, became an iconic image for Laguna Beach tourists.

Larsen was featured in newspapers and magazines. He appeared on postcards, photographs and paintings. News stories described him variously as a living legend, landmark and symbol of friendliness. Larsen lived in a rent-free room over a client's garage. Local patrons helped him with contributions and some restaurants provided free meals.

Some locals disapproved of Larsen, saying he was a public nuisance, an annoyance or "too loud". They wrote letters to the city to have him stopped. Larsen said, "They may think I'm crazy, but when a motorist comes to town, tired and weary of the traffic, and smiles when he leaves, does it matter what they think?" City council members dismissed the protests with bemusement because the majority of the town supported Larsen. In response to one well-publicized complaint in 1959, the mayor said Larsen could be the unofficial town greeter so long as he did not interfere with traffic. On February 14, 1964, after more than twenty years of Larsen welcoming visitors, Mayor William D. Martin proclaimed Larsen as Laguna's Official Greeter in a sidewalk ceremony that initiated the town's first Winter Festival.

Larsen continued his wanderlust for brief periods. In 1953, he left for a cabin in Idyllwild to become a writer, and returned to Laguna by the following year. One winter, Larsen walked to Palm Springs where it was warmer and began greeting people on a street corner there. Residents quickly complained and Larsen was escorted out of town by police to walk back to the coast. Each spring, Larsen hiked 30 miles over the mountains to attend the Easter sunrise service at Mount Rubidoux in Riverside. He often appeared at the Danish Days festival in Solvang, California, and once walked by himself in the Rose Parade.

=== Charity ===
Although he had little, Larsen's practice was to give away everything because he felt others "need it more than I do." He carried a black satchel with candy, postcards and books to hand out. A voracious reader, Larsen spent his earnings on books – often deep science and psychology – then gave the books away to friends, children and the local library.

Danes who knew Larsen compared his relationship with children to Hans Christian Andersen. According to one story, he handed out copies of Louis Untermeyer's poetry book For You With Love to each child on one Valentine's Day. Another year, he donated a collection of children's books to the Idyllwild Public Library.

=== Philosophy ===
Devoted to what he described as "my mission of friendliness", Larsen considered it his special duty. He said, "It's my spirit. It's a gift from God that few men have."

Larsen said that he developed his philosophical outlook after wandering in Siberia, South America and the United States. "When I was traveling around the country 40 years ago I made it a point to take up a vantage point and greet people," he said.

He suggested that his single gesture of goodwill had a ripple effect, saying, "Too many people driving along the highway are frowning and look unhappy. By waving, I make them smile and thousands of people have a happier day before them." Years later, he said, "I don't care who they are – they all respond to goodwill. Some don't speak English, but they understand anyway."

Reflecting on the value of his efforts, Larsen said, "Some people have millions of dollars and no friends. I've got practically nothing and thousands of friends who drive by to greet me."

== Later years ==
Larsen often suffered from emphysema and was hospitalized by a stroke in February 1967. When he recovered, Laguna residents collected $3000 for Larsen to visit his hometown in Denmark for the first time in 53 years. He was celebrated in Denmark and met the mayors of Copenhagen and Aarhus, then returned to Laguna Beach after the six-week visit.

For the next several years, Larsen lived in a free room at the Hotel Laguna and continued his greeter duties. The Eiler Larsen Tribute Fund was created to supplement his World War I veteran's pension and pay for any needs. In 1971, suffering from the onset of bladder and colon cancer, Larsen was forced to retire. His friends moved him to the Beverly Manor convalescent home in Capistrano Beach, Dana Point, California.

He died there on March 19, 1975. He is buried at Los Angeles National Cemetery.

== Legacy ==
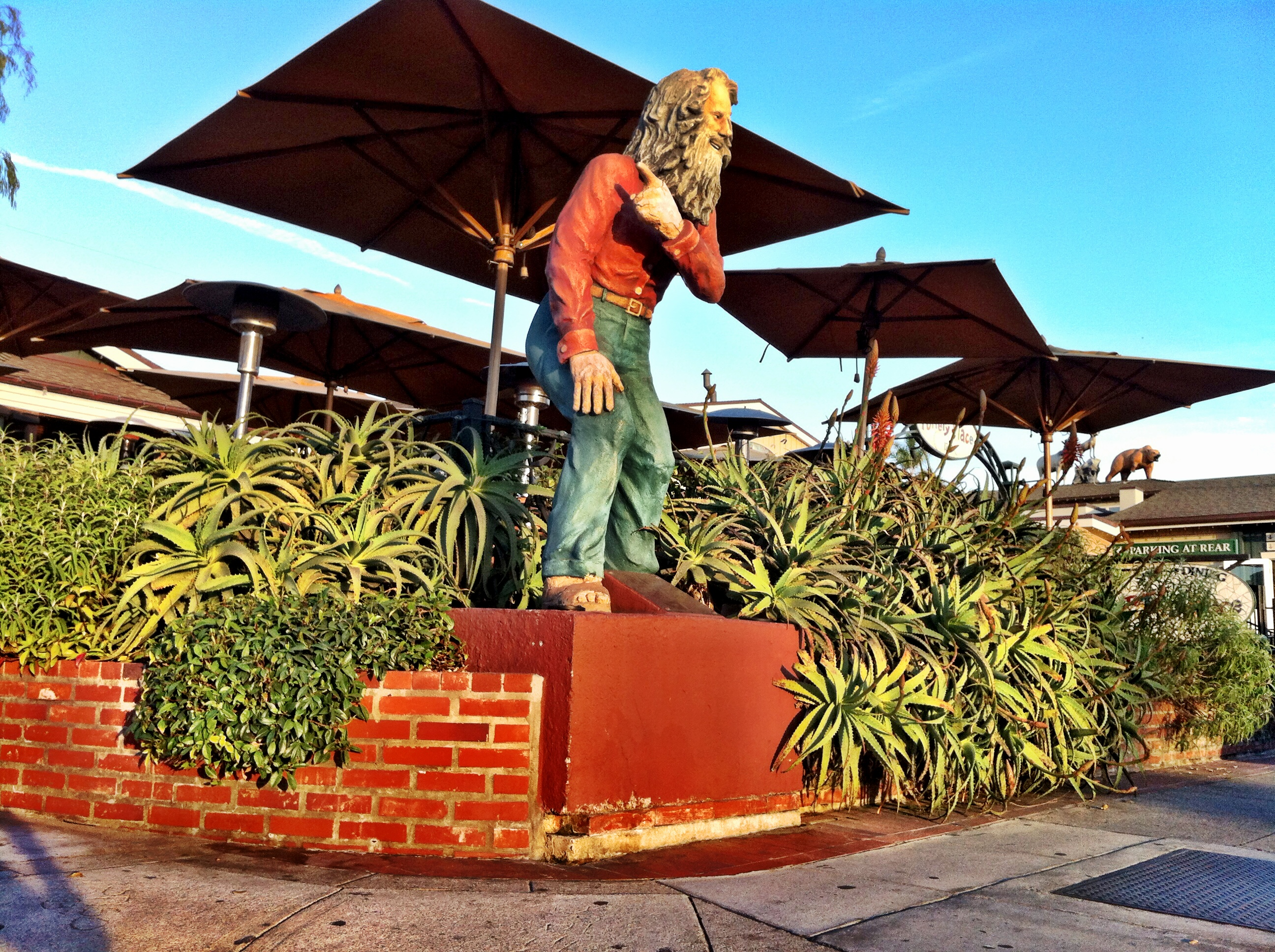
Statue of Eiler Larsen stands on the Pacific Coast Highway in Laguna Beach

Two large statues of Larsen were erected in Laguna Beach. The first, titled Hello-o-o-o-o-o-o- How Ar-r-re You?, is a painted cement casting created by sculptor Charles Beauvais in the 1960s, that stands outside the Pottery Place along Pacific Coast Highway. The plaque is dedicated to the "...philosopher, gardener and friend of man who devoted all his spare time spreading goodwill and cheer..." The second, created in 1986, is a life-sized redwood carving by Guy Angelo Wilson that stands at a downtown corner outside Greeter's Corner restaurant, named in Larsen's honor.

During a ceremony in February 1964, Larsen's footprints were impressed into the sidewalk at the intersection of Coast Highway and El Paseo Drive by Laguna's Main Beach.

Around Christmastime in 1963, a 45-rpm record called "The Greeter" was released on OBO Records. Composed by local artist Paul Blaine Henrie, the bossa nova song was sung by Rochelle Battat and featured Eiler Larsen shouting his catchphrases.

In honor of Larsen's contributions to the library, the City of Laguna Beach designated the short drive beside the city library as Eiler Larsen Lane.

=== Greeter tradition ===
Larsen was the best known town greeter in Laguna Beach, an unofficial role dating back to Old Joe Lucas in the 1880s. Lucas was an elderly Portuguese fisherman who had been shipwrecked. The long-haired white-bearded Lucas, who spoke little English except for swear words and carried a trident, took up the habit of welcoming the thrice-weekly arrivals and departures of the stage coach from El Toro, California. The community supported Lucas with a monthly stipend of $8. He died in 1908.

In 1983, 8 years after Larsen's death, a 51-year-old former hairdresser named No. 1 Unnamed Archer unofficially assumed the tradition of town greeter. Archer said he wasn't trying to be Larsen, "I'm only walking where he walked, keeping a tradition alive. It's a tradition that stands still until someone comes along and fills the bill." Archer continued intermittently for 25 years and died in 2009. In later years, several other local people have attempted to become the town greeter of Laguna Beach. Michael Minutoli is the most recent and consistent person to take up the job of greeter. He can often be seen waving and dancing by the Larsen statue on Brooks and PCH.
