= Thankyou (company) =

Australian social enterprise

- Type: Social Enterprise
- Founded: 2008
- Founders: Daniel Flynn; Justine Flynn; Jarryd Burns
- Headquarters: Melbourne, Australia
- Brands: Thankyou Body Care; Thankyou Baby
- Website: thankyou.co

Thankyou is an Australian social enterprise. From the sales of its water, body care, and food products, the company donates funds to safe water, hygiene and sanitation programs, and food security programs in 16 countries. The company has gained attention for its use of public lobbying via mainstream and social media in order to influence supermarket retailers to stock their products. Campaigns have led to partnerships with retailers including 7-Eleven, Coles and Woolworths.

== History ==
Daniel Flynn, Justine Flynn, and Jarryd Burns created Thankyou in 2008. Production began after an agreement with a factory that provided services at no upfront cost as well as a donation from Visy of 30,000 prototype bottles. Distributor Metro Beverage company picked them up shortly after.

In 2013, Thankyou launched lines for body care and food that fund hygiene and sanitation programs as well as food security programs. They rebranded from Thankyou Water to Thankyou and launched the Coles and Woolworths Campaign – a digital marketing and social media campaign targeting Australia's major supermarkets. In addition to social media efforts, Thankyou had support from the Channel 7 programme Sunrise as well as celebrity endorsements from Chrissie Swan and Jules Lund. They also flew helicopters (donated by benefactors) carrying banners over both Coles' Melbourne headquarters and Woolworths' Sydney headquarters with messages thanking the retailers for "changing the world (if you say yes)."

In August 2013, it was revealed that Thankyou was giving up to 30 per cent of its profits to Samaritan's Purse – a controversial evangelical Christian organisation that proselytises in developing countries "with the aim of demonstrating God's love and sharing the good news of Jesus Christ". Samaritan's Purse was not a signatory to the code of conduct run by the Australian Council for International Development, which bans aid as a vehicle for promoting religion or political groups and requires financial transparency and auditing. Thankyou Group co-founder and managing director Daniel Flynn also acknowledged the company had ties to the Planetshakers Church. Soon afterwards, Thankyou Group announced that it would no longer support Samaritan's Purse.

In 2014, Daniel Flynn was named Victorian Young Australian of the Year. By 2016, Thankyou raised $3.7 million for projects that have given over 190,000 people access to water, another 300,000 access to hygiene and sanitation, as well as funding 19.1 million days worth of food aid.

In July 2016, the company launched their baby care range which included nappies, body wash and shampoos. In December 2017, Thankyou announced they were ending their food product line. Thankyou expanded into New Zealand in June 2018 with their body care range.

In August 2020, Thankyou announced that they had stopped producing bottled water citing the negative environmental impact of the product as the reason. News.com.au noted that the company has already been gradually withdrawing for the bottled water category for several years due to strong competition from supermarket home brands.

== Development work ==
In 2014, Thankyou launched "Track Your Impact." In April 2015, Thankyou began its first Australian project, the Salvation Army's Hamodava Café in the Melbourne central business district. They currently work with, Red Cross, Oxfam, the Salvation Army and CARE.

By 2016, Thankyou raised $3.7 million for projects that have given over 190,000 people access to water, another 300,000 access to hygiene and sanitation, as well as funding 19.1 million days worth of food aid, across 17 countries.
