= Svend Unmack Larsen =

Danish politician

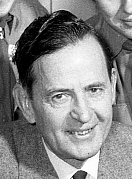
- Svend Unmack Larsen in 1956
- Born: 23 October 1893; Aarhus, Denmark
- Died: 23 March 1965 (aged 71); Aarhus, Denmark
- Occupation: Politician
- Spouse: Carla Held Andersen (m. 1919; died 1961)
- Relatives: Eiler Larsen (brother)

Svend Unmack Larsen (23 September 1893 – 23 March 1965) was a Danish politician for the Social Democratic Party who served as Denmark's Minister of Justice (1939–1940) and was the mayor of Aarhus, Denmark for 13 years (1945–1958).

== Early life ==
Larsen was born in Aarhus on 23 September 1893, the son of L.M. Larsen and Thyra Vilhelmine Unmack. His father was the director of the city's poorhouse and Larsen was raised there. Larsen said that his childhood among the poor was "this mixture of tragedy and baroque, macabre comedy" and gave him an understanding of social problems and the dark sides of society. Larsen had an older brother, Eiler Larsen, who earned fame as "the Greeter" in Laguna Beach, California.

== Career ==
Larsen graduated from law school in 1918 and worked in the criminal courts. He served as chairman of the district rent control board. As chairman of the city library association, Larsen was instrumental in forcing the city to refurbish its library system. Later, as a member of the city council, he chaired the committee for public library construction. Larsen was elected to the city council and served from 1 April 1933 until March 1937 when he chose not to run again. In September 1939, Larsen accepted a position as the Justice Minister of Denmark for Prime Minister of Denmark Thorvald Stauning. Following the Nazi occupation of Denmark on 9 April 1940, the Germans took issue with Larsen's hard stance against Danish Nazis. They removed Larsen from office on 8 July 1940. He was again elected to the Aarhus city council in 1943. Following the sudden death of Aarhus mayor, Stecher Christensen, Larsen was chosen as his successor beginning 21 June 1945. He served until 1 October 1958.

The Danish historian Ole Degn stated that Larsen was a primary influence on social and philanthropic development: new public housing projects, the preservation of natural green spaces and beaches, and the support of the arts, library science and cultural institutions. According to Degn, Larsen suffered from violent mood swings. Debilitating depression led him to abandon political office in 1958.

== Personal life ==
Larsen married Ingeborg Carla Held Andersen, the daughter of a postmaster, on 27 November 1919. She died on 15 January 1961 in Aarhus. Larsen died 23 March 1965.

== See also ==
- List of mayors of Aarhus

== Sources ==
- Degn, Ole; Dybdahl, Vagn (1968). Borgere i byens råd – Medlemmer af Århus bys borgerrepræsentation og byråd, 1838-1968 [Citizens of the city council – Members of the City of Aarhus Municipal Council and City Council, 1838-1968] (in Danish). Universitetsforlaget.
- Dybdahl, Vagn (1953). Seksten Århusrids, tilegnede Svend Unmack Larsen, 23. september 1953. Universitetsforlaget.

Political offices
| Preceded by Karl Kristian Steincke | Justice Minister of Denmark; April 1939 – June 1940 | Succeeded by Harald Petersen |
| Preceded by Einar Stecher Christensen | Mayor of Aarhus; 1945–1958 | Succeeded by Bernhardt Jensen |
