= Gay Pimpin' with Jonny McGovern =

LGBTQ podcast

- L-R: Jonny, Linda and Martin
- Genre: Comedy, LGBTQ

Cast and voices
- Hosted by: Jonny McGovern; Julie Goldman; Brandy Howard

Publication
- Original release: January 16, 2006

Related
- Website: gaypimp.com

Gay Pimpin' with Jonny McGovern is a bi-weekly free gay-themed podcast based out of Hollywood, California, originally out of New York City. The show, which is hosted by Jonny McGovern, began airing on January 16, 2006.

McGovern announced on the January 11, 2010 episode that Gay Pimpin' with Jonny McGovern was ending as a regular podcast. He cited his upcoming relocation to Los Angeles and co-hosts Linda James and Martin Beauchamp's desire to spend more time with their respective families as the reasons. McGovern began re-releasing earlier episodes and recording occasional episodes updating listeners on the activities of the cast and friends. On September 1, 2010, McGovern re-launched the podcast from Los Angeles. In late 2012 he began adding Mixtape Editions (featuring music curated by regular and semi-regular cast members) between regular editions of the podcast.

== Cast ==
- Jonny McGovern – Host
- Linda James – Co-host, trans individual and a Team PIMP member
- Martín Beauchamp – a.k.a. Straighty Martín
- Julie Goldman – Comedian, McGovern's co-star from The Big Gay Sketch Show
- Brandy Howard – Actress, self-proclaimed "lesbian lurker," and Goldman's writing partner (particularly for Joan Rivers' "Fashion Police")
- Michael Serrato – Actor and comedian, a former castmate of McGovern's on The Big Gay Sketch Show
- Calpernia Addams – Actress and singer, star of Transamerican Love Story
- Nadya Ginsburg – Comedian
- Sam Pancake – Actor
- Todd Masterson – Comedian
- Nico Santos – Comedian

=== Regular guests ===
- Pom-Pom – Joined the cast in Cycle 3, Pom-Pom is a New York University student who worked for free as the show's intern. May 6, 2008 was Pom-Pom's last episode. Pom-Pom was renamed by co-host Linda James after comedian Kathy Griffin's dog of the same name from My Life on the D-List.
- Erickatoure Aviance – A transgender mulatto individual and member of La'Mady, Team PIMP and show performer.
- Adam Joseph – Soul hummingbird, singer-songwriter, producer and member of Jonny's Team PIMP whose single "Faggoty Attention" spent several weeks at No. 1 on Logo's music video charts.
- Andy "Krunk" Jones a.k.a. Mother Krunk Sparkle Magick – Originally hailing from Tennessee and mother of the (conceptual) House of Sparkle Magick. Krunk is a self-proclaimed (conceptual) double Dutch champion.
- Kevin Kiss – Jonny's ex-boyfriend. Also known as "The Moosch"; following a text message mishap temporarily became "The Miisch." McGovern announced their breakup on his October 13, 2009 podcast.
- Sophia Lamar – An original club kid who expresses her views on what has irritated her lately. Until cycle 5, Sophia's rants were usually weekly. After cycle 5, Sophia's rants became monthly before disappearing.
- Julie Goldman – Comedian, songwriter, Jew, and butch lesbian, also McGovern's co-star on The Big Gay Sketch Show (now a regular on the Hollywood edition).
- Michael Serrato – Comedian and former cast member of The Big Gay Sketch Show, Serrato is a frequent correspondent, providing the Hollywood perspective on celebrity gossip (a regular when the Hollywood edition began).
- Maxi J – Is an African-American woman and soul singer who is one of Jonny McGovern's sources of "Black Lady Screamin'" and a member of Team PIMP.
- Davey Makeout – A receptionist at the Mud Honey Beauty Salon in NYC. He is an American Idol junkie and was almost chosen for Project Runway 's third season.
- Vanilla Makeout – Davey's wife. She is the daughter of a Polish consular official, leading Davey to (erroneously) claim that he has diplomatic immunity.
- Donavan and Tim/Tammy – Two interns who joined the show in cycle 6. Tammy got his nickname from Adam Joseph. Donavan did not return for cycle 7. Tammy followed Jonny to LA and eventually was "promoted" to regular cast member, developing the drag persona Tamantha Taintawoman and an obsession with Liza Minnelli.
- Jaytee Starr – A New York intern from cycle 8.
- Lex – An LA intern.
- Greg McKeon – Actor and gogo boy, also known as Grg.

=== Recurring characters ===
These are characters, not celebrity impressions, who have appeared on the podcast more than once.

- Joanie McGovern – Jonny's fictional aunt who is the editrix of Star Magazine. She is from Mineola, New York, and speaks with an accent from that region.
- Chocolate Puddin – A psychic, transvestite, prostitute, nanny and star of several fictional Blaxploitation films. Owner of the Spooky Fry Hut, which is a haunted snack shop that serves "spooky fries" and "zombie BBQ".
- Waffles – The morbidly obese backup dancer for performer Jennifer Hudson. Joanie, Puddin' and Waffles have joined together as singing group That Lady after Puddin' was refused admission to La'Mady. That Lady has had two songs appear on the podcast. McGovern brought Chocolate Puddin' to television in the first season of The Big Gay Sketch Show and Waffles appeared in season two. Waffles premiered his debut single, "Eat That" (a parody of Janet Jackson's "Feedback"), on the February 25, 2008 episode.
- Tranny-Tron 2000 – The first ever transgender robot, built by Martin only to be smashed by Linda. Tranny-Tron 2000 begat Tranny-Tron 2001, who was also destroyed by Linda after performing an anti-Linda diss track.
- Numb Fat Tiger – A fictional tiger that eats human fat for sustenance and has an anesthetic bite.
- Choo Choo – The fictitious security guard of the Gay Pimpin' studio.
- Jojo The F to M Penis, Made from a Clit – A talking penis formed from a clitoris during female to male gender reassignment surgery. Jojo performs consensual rape and sexually harasses or molests (consensually) lesbian and lesbro guests.
- Moanie McGovern – Joanie's sister, Moanie is an F2M transsexual undergoing hormone therapy. These treatments have made her very aggressive. She works as a bouncer at a number of local clubs.
- Wendy McBurgerking – a socially awkward, mildly mentally challenged young woman whose sole conversational gambit is to randomly blurt out the names of fast-food restaurants where her mother had worked.
- Rape Ghost – The diminutive spirit of a raped and murdered young girl (as in The Lovely Bones). She spends the afterlife constantly reminding loved ones of her rape and murder.
- Britney Spears – More than just a celebrity impression, she evolved into a full-fledged character with her own parallel life, which has included her court-appointed minder Chubs as well as an attempt to sell her own babies to a pet store. Her sister Jamie Lynn is obsessed with "The Jewel of the Nile".

=== Notable guests ===
- Kate McKinnon – Openly lesbian Emmy Award winning actress, best known as a regular cast member on Saturday Night Live
- Kevin Aviance – New York nightlife star, and gay icon who sings the theme for "Spillin' The Tea"
- Martha Wash – Singer, songwriter, and founding member of The Weather Girls (It's Raining Men) and voice of several 1990s dance anthems
- RuPaul – Singer, songwriter, talk show host and gay icon
- Richard Jay-Alexander – Entertainment producer and director of Barbra Streisand tours and Bette Midler's Kiss My Brass tour. Mentor to Jonny McGovern and producer of his first music video.
- Calpernia Addams – Transgender actress and activist. First appeared on the March 11, 2008 podcast, later a regular in the Hollywood edition.
- Junior Vasquez – DJ and producer. Appeared on the March 30, 2009 podcast.
- Larry Tee – DJ, club promoter, music producer in New York.
- Man Parrish – Underground music scene icon in the late '70s / early '80s.
- Selene Luna – Actress, comedian, burlesque star, model. Personal assistant to Margaret Cho on her reality series.
