= GoGo for the Gold =

American reality television show

- Genre: Reality television
- Presented by: Jonny McGovern
- Judges: Adrian Hart; Greg McKeon; Jojo Guadz; Teddy Bear
- Country of origin: United States
- Original language: English
- No. of seasons: 2
- No. of episodes: 11

Production
- Production company: Amazon Prime

Original release
- Release: May 13, 2022

GoGo for the Gold is an American competitive reality television show produced by Hey Qween TV, which seeks to discover for the best male stripper in the United States who will receive a prize of $10,000. The program started airing on May 13, 2022 and is hosted by Jonny McGovern and judged by Adrian Hart, Greg McKeon, Jojo Guadz, and Teddy Bear. The second season began to air on June 14, 2022.
