= Samaritan's Purse =

Evangelical Christian humanitarian aid organization

- Founded: 1970
- Founder: Bob Pierce
- Type: Faith-based
- Purpose: Religious ministry and crisis relief
- Location: Boone, North Carolina, U.S.
- Region served: International
- Method: Direct aid; Program funding
- President: Franklin Graham
- Revenue: $1 billion USD
- Website: samaritanspurse.org

Samaritan's Purse is an evangelical Christian humanitarian aid organization that provides aid to people in physical need as a key part of its Christian missionary work. The organization's president is Franklin Graham, son of Christian evangelist Billy Graham. The name of the organization is derived from the New Testament Parable of the Good Samaritan. With international headquarters in Boone, North Carolina, United States, the organization also maintains warehouse and aviation facilities in nearby North Wilkesboro and Greensboro, North Carolina.

== History ==
Samaritan's Purse was founded in 1970 by Baptist pastor Robert Pierce, the founder of World Vision International, in Hollywood, California, and was relocated to Boone, North Carolina by Franklin Graham in 1980.

Franklin Graham met Pierce in 1973, and they made several trips together to visit relief projects and missionary partners in Asia and elsewhere. Graham became president of Samaritan's Purse in 1979, following Pierce's death the prior year.

By 2022, Samaritan's Purse had offices in the United States, Australia, Canada, Germany, the United Kingdom and South Korea. Beyond the offices in those six countries, Samaritan's Purse also has field offices in 15 countries as of August 2025. The organization provides assistance in more than 100 countries. It operates worldwide as Samaritan's Purse, Ippan Shadan Houjin in Japan and as the Emmanuel Group, a wholly owned aircraft title holding corporation formed in 2004.

== Programs ==
Samaritan's Purse includes several ongoing ministries.

- North American Ministries (NAM) responds to emergency situations in North America.
  - Operation Heal Our Patriots (OHOP) provides lodging and outdoor activities in Alaska for wounded veterans and their spouses. It is a sub-ministry of NAM.
- International Projects responds to emergency situations around the world.
- World Medical Mission (WWM), the medical arm of Samaritan's Purse, was founded in 1977 by brothers Dr. Richard Furman and Dr. Lowell Furman to enable doctors to serve short-term assignments at overwhelmed missionary hospitals.
- Children's Heart Project (CHP) provides surgery for children born with heart defects in countries where proper care is not available.
- Operation Christmas Child

=== Operation Christmas Child ===
Operation Christmas Child was created in 1990 by Dave Cooke and his wife Gill for children in Romania. Each November thousands of churches, schools, groups, and individual donors prepare and collect shoeboxes filled with toys, school supplies, personal items, and other small gifts. A booklet of Bible stories is often distributed alongside the shoebox gifts which are given to children based on need alone, regardless of their faith. These boxes are then distributed overseas by volunteers. As of 2024, over 232 million shoeboxes have been delivered.

In 1994, a pioneering figure of the program, Mary Damron, collected 1,256 shoeboxes from family and neighbors in her impoverished community of Wyoming County, West Virginia. Damron was one of the first major collectors of shoeboxes for Operation Christmas Child, and soon became an ambassador and missionary for the program. She traveled to over 40 countries during her time as a missionary with Samaritan's Purse. Damron died in December 2024, aged 70.

In November 2022, the organization reached a milestone by distributing its 200 millionth Christmas shoebox. Elizabeth Groff, who was born in Ukraine and adopted by an American family in 2007, delivered the 200 millionth shoebox gift to a child in Ukraine.

The program uses "follow-up" evangelism with pamphlets of Bible stories that are given to families that receive the boxes.

The follow-up evangelism program of Operation Christmas Child is called "The Greatest Journey". It is a 12-week discipleship program for children who receive shoebox gifts.

=== U.S. disaster relief ===
Samaritan's Purse launched a large civilian airlift operation to relieve those affected by Hurricane Helene (late September 2024). The organization completed 358 missions (helicopter and fixed wing). 35,000 volunteers participated in cleaning the affected areas from mud, trees, and debris. In November 2024, Samaritan's Purse announced the launch of its new Hurricane Helene Rebuild Program. In May 2025, Franklin Graham started welcoming the first families into their new homes, which were provided free-of-charge and fully furnished.

=== Emergency aid ===
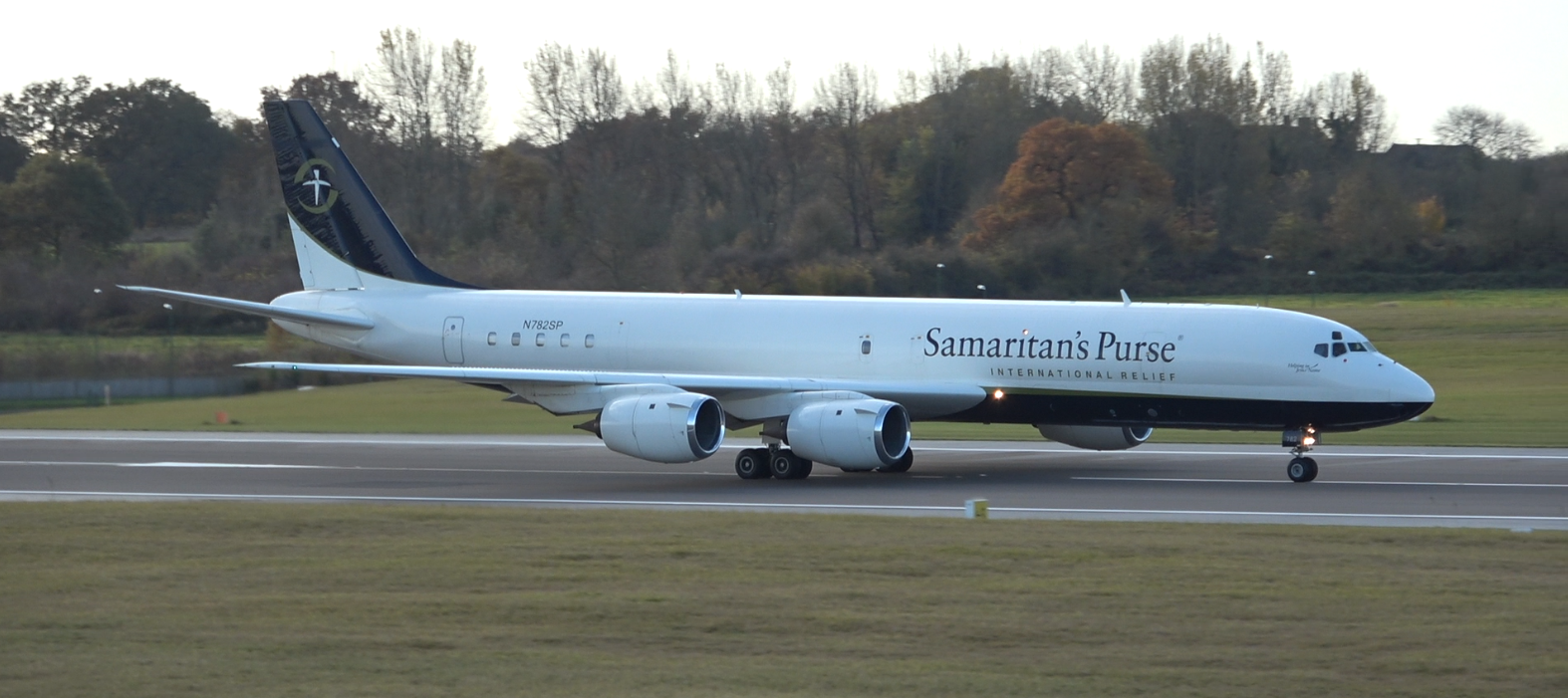
A Samaritan's Purse Douglas DC-8 used for the emergency transport of basic necessities and aid workers

The organization's medical mission in Liberia, West Africa, was one of only two medical NGOs active in Liberia during the beginning of the 2014 Ebola outbreak. Samaritan's Purse and SIM USA both have been actively engaged in treating the outbreak of Ebola hemorrhagic fever in Liberia. On August 1, 2014, the organization announced that it was evacuating 60 nonessential personnel from Liberia. Dr. Kent Brantly, a Texas-based doctor working for the organization, was the first U.S. citizen to contract the Ebola virus in Liberia while treating the disease. He arrived in the United States on Saturday, August 2, and was treated and subsequently released after nearly three weeks in a special isolation unit of Emory University Hospital in Atlanta, Georgia. The organization recorded their mission in Liberia in the documentary Facing Darkness. Samaritan's Purse has a fleet of 24 aircraft (22 planes and 2 helicopters) for the emergency transport of basic necessities and aid workers.

The organization launched hygiene and public awareness campaigns about prevention and diagnosis and airlifted nearly 200 tons of relief supplies to the country. Samaritan's Purse also responded to the large Ebola outbreak in the Democratic Republic of Congo in 2018. During that crisis, the organization set up a 56-bed emergency field hospital in Komanda where teams of Samaritan's Purse doctors and nurses treated nearly 600 patients who were in desperate need of care.

=== Ukraine aid ===
According to the Ukrainian government, Samaritan's Purse has been operating in Ukraine through Operation Christmas Child since 1996. Samaritan's Purse began its full response in Ukraine in February 2022 when Russia's full-scale invasion began. Since the start of the war, the organization, both directly and through local partners, has been delivering food, water, warm clothing, shelter, winter heating solutions and medical assistance. More than 10 million Ukrainians have benefited from this aid. The organization has established cooperation with 2,000 Ukrainian partners.

The organization stepped efforts to aid Ukraine in the midst of the Russian invasion of Ukraine in 2022. The first mission staff arrived in Ukraine in February 2022. During the initial phase of the war, a DC-8 aircraft transported up to 84,000 pounds of aid, which was then delivered to Ukraine through Poland. The organization's warehouse in North Wilkesboro, North Carolina, was used for the aid distribution. By December 2022, the organization had distributed 100 million pounds (45,000 metric tons) of food to those affected by the war in Ukraine. The organization's aircraft was also used for evacuating Ukrainian refugees. In May 2022, 28 Ukrainians were flown to Canada.

The organization donated various supplies especially for the youth in schools such as medication, food, supplies, blankets, tarps, and bags. The donations were made through various methods of transportation such as semi trucks being loaded with roughly 80,000 donation goods, being transferred at Piedmont Triad International Airport on the DC-8 airplane, and then being air lifted to Poland where the goods are transported across the border to Ukraine. The organization accomplished its 30th airlift donation in the month of September having started in February, equating to roughly 4 airlifts per month. It is estimated that 5.5 million Ukrainians were aided due to the efforts with food, water, and supplies. Furthermore, the organization provided roughly 30 emergency field support hospitals in Lviv with the result of aiding nearly 18,000 patients.

The deployment of the emergency field hospital in Ukraine began on March 3, 2022. The hospital was located in an underground parking lot of a shopping centre in Lviv. In September 2022, it was reported that the organization supported 30 medical facilities across Ukraine. According to Ukraine's Ministry of Health, more than 33,700 outpatient consultations were provided and over 260 surgeries were performed in the field hospitals set up with Samaritan's Purse support. Additionally, 253 metric tons of medical supplies were delivered to 164 medical facilities in Ukraine. In December 2022, generators were provided for hospitals in the Kherson region, as well as for the so-called points of invincibility across the region. Samaritan's Purse also trained 18,000 local Ukrainian medical professionals.

To further support Ukraine, in March 2023, Samaritan's Purse and its Ukrainian subsidiary, the Samaritan's Purse Ukraine Charitable Foundation, signed a five-party memorandum of understanding and cooperation with Ukrainian government structures, including the Ministry of Social Policy, the Ministry of Health, and the Ministry for Reintegration of Temporarily Occupied Territories.

=== Israel and Gaza aid ===
The organization provided support to those affected by the Gaza war. In November 2023, the President of Samaritan's Purse, Franklin Graham, visited Israel to assess the damage from the 7 October Hamas-led attack on Israel and met with Israeli Prime Minister Benjamin Netanyahu in Tel Aviv. The organization provided hygiene kits, hot meals, food boxes, and vouchers for internally displaced people in Israel. Also, rescue teams were provided with medical equipment, including defibrillators and 1,000 trauma kits for rapid emergency care. Hot meals and food were delivered in partnership with 50 local churches. During his visit, Franklin Graham suggested that Magen David Adom, Israel's emergency services system, equivalent to the Red Cross first responders, needed a small fleet of armored ambulances. As of September 2024, Samaritan's Purse is donating 42 ambulances to Magen David Adom. The organization was also working to support two Christian communities in Gaza by coordinating evacuation routes for them. In July 2025, Samaritan's Purse began airlifting food to Gaza, sending 65 tons of food for starving Palestinians on three air missions.

=== Other relief ===
Regarding the March 28 Myanmar earthquake of 2025, Samaritan's Purse reported that a DC-8 plane containing a field hospital landed in Myanmar on April 5; and on April 6, a chartered 747 took off from Greenville, South Carolina carrying more than 100 tons of relief supplies. Samaritan's Purse treated over 5,800 patients and performed over 300 surgeries during the Myanmar Earthquake Response. The organization also produced more than 59,000 gallons of fresh water for earthquake victims using six filtration units.

== Evangelistic initiatives ==
=== European Congress on Evangelism (2025) ===
In May 2025, Franklin Graham held the European Congress on Evangelism in Berlin, drawing about 1,000 Christian leaders from 55 to 56 countries. The meeting emphasized "proclamation evangelism," urging pastors to preach the gospel "unashamedly" amid perceived cultural opposition. The event also highlighted tensions within European evangelicalism: while British apologist Amy Orr-Ewing reported unprecedented openness to the Christian message among Gen Z, Finnish MP Päivi Räsänen's ongoing legal case illustrated constraints on public religious expression. During the congress on 28 May 2025, Graham met Ukrainian president Volodymyr Zelenskyy and led delegates in prayer for peace in the Russo-Ukrainian War, also praying for Vladimir Putin and U.S. president Donald Trump.

== Samaritan's Purse airplane fleet ==
As of August 2025, Samaritan's Purse operates the following aircraft:

Samaritan's Purse fleet
Aircraft	In fleet	Orders	Notes
Boeing 757-200PCF	1		
Boeing 767-300F	1		
Cessna 408 SkyCourier	1		
Total	3	—	

Samaritan's Purse operates a number of aircraft. This includes one Boeing 767 and one Boeing 757. The fleet is deployed on regular missions and has previously been on display at the EAA AirVenture Oshkosh airshow. Their Douglas DC-8 was notable in their fleet for being the last US-registered DC-8 in the world.

In 2025, Samaritan's Purse announced plans to retire its DC-8 and took delivery of a Boeing 767F. The DC-8 was officially retired in November 2025, and it is to be donated to Liberty University in Lynchburg, Virginia.

== Financials ==
The organization's 2021 financial statement listed $758 million in cash donations and another $245 million in donated goods and services. 85% of its $676 million in expenses went to ministry expenses with the largest share (42%) going to their Operation Christmas Child project, 17% to emergency relief, and 7% to its medical missions. Most expenses come from direct costs in delivering in emergencies, medical relief, and Operation Christmas Child (57%) along with staff salaries and other employment expenses (20%). In 2024, Samaritan's Purse had a total revenue of $1.2 billion, and reported that 84.66% of its expenses went to ministry work, 6.88% went toward general and administrative costs, and 8.6% went toward fundraising. Financial Accountability

The organization has received a 4 star rating (out of 4 stars) from the monitoring organization Charity Navigator.

Samaritan's Purse has received $350 million in US federal grants since 2016, though as of 2025 that funding accounts for less than 5% of its revenue. In 2020, it declined federal funding from the Trump administration originally withheld from the World Health Organization. In 2025, the Trump administration made significant cuts to USAID, halting a range of disaster relief, global health, and other foreign humanitarian assistance. Samaritan's Purse receives such assistance, including money spent on medicine and hunger relief in Africa. Franklin Graham said he believed his organization would be exempted from the cuts and supported efforts to "assess and reexamine" aid programs.

== Facilities and fleets ==
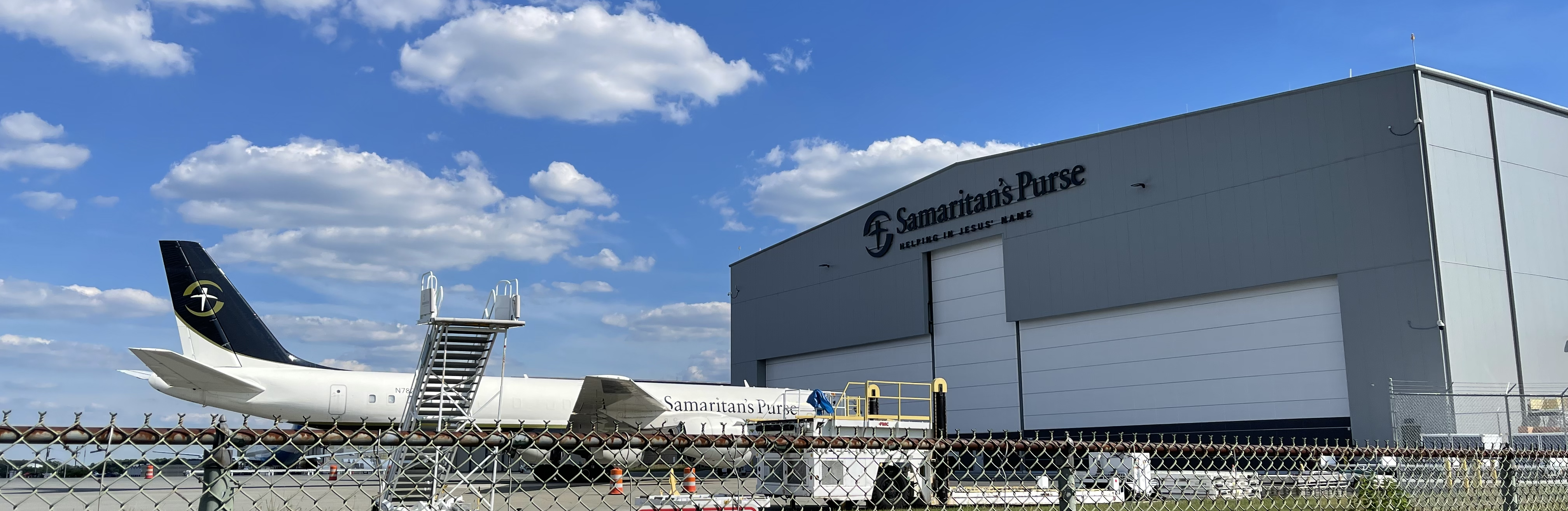
Samaritan's Purse facilities at the Piedmont Triad International Airport in Greensboro, North Carolina

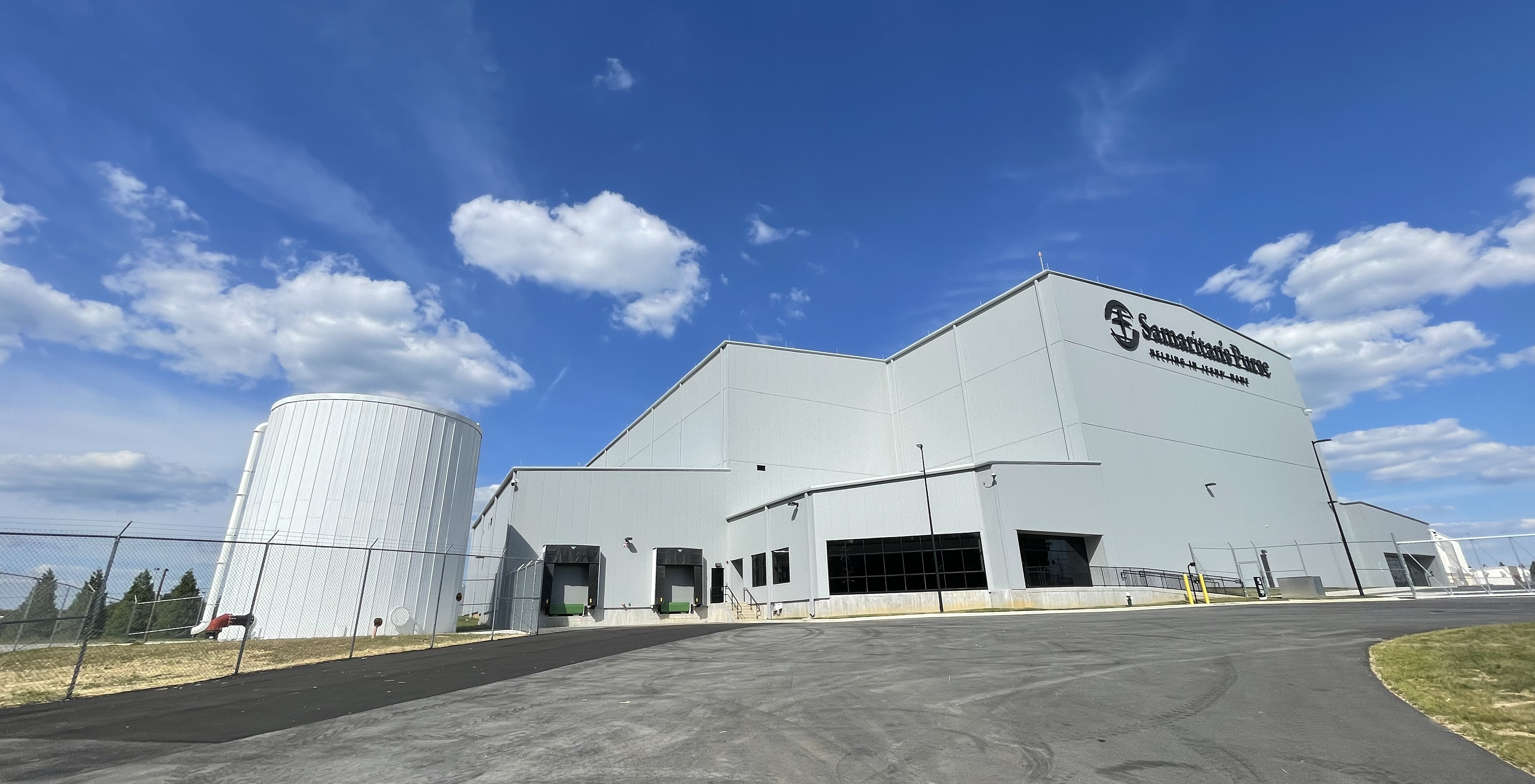
Samaritan's Purse facilities include maintenance, cargo loading facilities, and fuel storage

Based in Boone, North Carolina, the organization also maintains warehouse and administrative facilities in North Wilkesboro, North Carolina including a 202,000 square feet (18,800 m^{2}) former bottling plant and newly constructed 47,000 square feet (4,400 m^{2}) facility where its 5 custom tractor trailers used for distributing relief supplies are staged.

The organization also operates a fleet of 23 passenger, cargo, and executive aircraft positioned around the world, registered in the organizations name and to the Emmanuel Group, a holding company.

Operations focused at their maintenance facilities at the Piedmont Triad International Airport, along with additional hangar facilities at the Wilkes County Airport. A $1.5 million taxiway was built by the State of North Carolina in 2019 to serve the organization's second hangar at that airport under construction at the time. Aircraft serve humanitarian relief missions as well as executive transportation.

- Douglas DC-3 registered N467SP in 2010, based in Kenya.
- Boeing 757-200, configured as a freighter. Built in 1985, began service as a passenger aircraft with Eastern Airlines then several British and Icelandic airlines. Converter to a freighter in 2006 where it flew for DHL and other airlines before being registered as N783SP in 2022.
- Boeing 767-300 Freighter, registered as N367SP. Built in 2006, formerly flew with ANA Cargo and Qantas Freight. It officially replaced the organization's DC-8.
- Beech Super King B200 turboprop registered as N874SP in 2010.
- Beech Super King B300 turboprop registered as N841KA in 2020
- Two CASA 212-CC cargo aircraft designed for take off and landing from short runways. Registered as N831SP and N499SP in 2010.
- Five Cessna 208 nine passenger aircraft
- A Cessna 172 Skyhawk and a Cessna 182E Skylane 2 seat aircraft.
- Cessna A185F six seat aircraft originally designed for agricultural use.
- One de Havilland Canada DHC-3 Otter and two Quest Kodiak 100 turboprop bush planes for transportation around Alaska including to the organization's retreat in Port Alsworth, Alaska
- Bell 206-L4 helicopter registered to Samaritan's Purse in 2016 as N146SP.
- Gulfstream G550 19 passenger executive aircraft, registered as N521GV to Emmanuel Group.
- Dassault Falcon 50 9 passenger executive aircraft, registered as N50FJ to Emmanuel Group.
- Dassault Falcon 900EX 13 passenger executive aircraft, registered as N900FJ to Emmanuel Group.

Previous aircraft include a Mitsubishi MU 2 purchased in the mid-1990s and a Learjet 45 bought in 2020 and sold in 2021 In addition it operated the last Douglas DC-8-72CF in the United States; it was configured to support up to 32 passengers and 10 cargo pallets. The aircraft was built in 1968 and began service for Finnair, then by the French Air Force beginning in 1985, then by charter airline Air Transport International before being registered to Samaritan's Purse in 2015. The aircraft recently flew missions an average of once per month. The aircraft was retired on November 14, 2025, and was donated to Liberty University in Lynchburg, Virginia on December 7, 2025.

The organization donated two Beechcraft King Air B200 aircraft in 2011 to a similar Micronesia-based organization.

== Controversy ==
The organization has been criticized for requiring staff to sign a controversial statement of faith that rejects homosexuality and same-sex marriage. Criticism arose when Samaritan's Purse set up an emergency field hospital in New York City during the COVID-19 pandemic. The organization's board of directors, which includes Franklin Graham's son, Edward Bell Graham, has also been criticized for the US$622,000 (equivalent to $844,848 in 2025) paid to Franklin Graham (as of 2015), which was 40–50% more than the salary paid to the heads of similar non-profit organizations. In 2024, The Charlotte Observer published a report comparing the 15 largest nonprofits in North Carolina. Samaritan's Purse had one of the highest revenues in North Carolina, and Franklin Graham earned the lowest salary among the highest earners.

In March 2001, The New York Times reported that Samaritan's Purse had "blurred the line between church and state" in the way it had distributed publicly funded aid to victims of the January 2001 and February 2001 El Salvador earthquakes. Residents from several villages stated they first had to sit through a half-hour prayer meeting before receiving assistance. In a statement, USAID said Samaritan's Purse had not violated federal guidelines, but emphasized the need for the organization to "maintain adequate and sufficient separation" between prayer sessions and publicly funded activities. Franklin Graham has said that Samaritan's Purse does not force Christianity on others, even in privately funded ministry work where government grants are not involved. In 2020, he told The New York Times that the organization's staff "would not force themselves on somebody and try to force our religion on somebody or what we believe. We don't do that." In 2025, Graham told Christianity Today, "Like the biblical story of the Good Samaritan, we help people in the ditches of life regardless of their beliefs or background—without asking for anything in return."

In 2003, Islamic leaders criticized Samaritan's Purse within the United Kingdom after Franklin Graham called Islam a "very evil and wicked religion", leading to opposition campaigns by the Islamic leaders. Samaritan's Purse responded to accusations of being anti-Islamic by highlighting its long history of non-denominational co-operation and charity work in throughout the Muslim world without attempting to preach or proselytize. Franklin Graham told the Baptist Press, "As the leader of an international Christian relief organization, my calling is to provide food, clothing, housing, supplies and medical care to hurting people everywhere regardless of faith. Samaritan's Purse has provided more relief and aid to Muslim people than to any other people in the world."

The Operation Christmas Child project has been criticized in several countries, most notably in the UK, but also in Ireland, India, and Canada. In the United States, Ibrahim Hooper of the Council on American-Islamic Relations has stated that such religion-and-relief groups are "using their position of power to try to persuade people to leave their faith." In 2003, the British supermarket chain Co-op and South Wales Fire Service both suspended their support for the project after numerous complaints about its religious connections. Samaritan's Purse responded by stating that Christian literature was only handed out where its staff "deemed it appropriate".

Franklin Graham drew scrutiny in 2009 for receiving a full-time salary from Samaritan's Purse while also receiving a full-time salary from Billy Graham Evangelistic Association (BGEA). This was called into question after his 2008 compensation from both organizations totaled $1.2 million (most of this was the result of a new IRS rule that required him to re-report deferred retirement contributions that had already been reported over the previous three years). Some experts on non-profits have questioned whether one person can perform two full-time jobs leading organizations that employ hundreds and spend hundreds of millions around the world. In response to the questions about his compensation, Graham decided to give up his salary from BGEA, stating his calling to the ministry "was never based on compensation." He also had contributions to his retirement plans suspended until the economy bounced back. However, Graham was again criticized in 2015 when it was revealed he had again taken up his salary from BGEA, and that his annual compensation was significantly higher than that of the CEO's of similar but much larger non-profit organisations.

In 2010, an American woman and two Sudanese men were kidnapped while working for Samaritan's Purse in Sudan. The two men were released promptly, but the woman was held for three months. Upon her return to the US, she sued Samaritan's Purse and their security contractor, Clayton Consultants, a hostage negotiation consultancy owned by Triple Canopy, accusing the organization "of failing to train its security personnel adequately and of willfully ignoring warning signs that abductions were a threat to foreigners." The organization settled out of court in March 2012.

In May 2013, Franklin Graham wrote a letter to President Obama expressing concern that the IRS targeted Samaritan's Purse with a partisan audit before the 2012 United States presidential election.

In August 2013, Thankyou Group announced that it would no longer support Samaritan's Purse because it is not a signatory to the code of conduct run by the Australian Council for International Development, which bans aid as a vehicle for promoting religion or political groups.

== Response to the COVID-19 outbreak ==
=== Italy ===
On March 17, 2020, Samaritan's Purse dispatched over 105 disaster response specialists, as well as two airlifts carrying 38 tons of medical equipment and a field hospital to Cremona, Italy which started operations on March 20, 2020. The organization treated more than 280 patients, and the city council later made Samaritan's Purse honorary citizens.

=== Alaska ===
Samaritans' Purse airlifted 8 tons of medical supplies to Alaska on April 7, 2020, to help provide supplies to remote communities.

=== New York ===
In cooperation with New York City's Mount Sinai Hospital, Samaritan's Purse constructed a 14 tent, 68-bed field hospital in Central Park on March 29, 2020, to increase Mount Sinai's surge capacity. Through April, over 315 people were treated there. By early May, all patients had been discharged, and there were plans to dismantle the tents.

==== Criticism ====
Before the field hospital opened, journalists, politicians and LGBTQ activists raised concerns that it was only recruiting Christian medical staff and that it would provide inadequate and discriminatory care. Volunteers are required to adhere to a statement of faith, which includes, among other points, a definition of marriage as "exclusively the union of one genetic male and one genetic female" A separate part of the statement affirms that "God will banish the unrighteous to everlasting punishment in hell." Both of these reflect long-standing evangelical Christian beliefs, though critics argued that their inclusion raised concerns about potential discrimination in practice. New York Mayor Bill de Blasio stated that the presence of Samaritan's Purse was "very troubling," while New York State Senator Brad Hoylman told NBC News that he considered it "a shame that the federal government has left us in the position of having to accept charity from such bigots". Franklin Graham later responded to Hoylman's request for public reassurance by stating: "We do not make distinctions about an individual's religion, race, sexual orientation, or economic status. We certainly do not discriminate, and we have a decades-long track record that confirms just that." Mount Sinai Health System also affirmed that Samaritan's Purse adhered to its own non-discrimination policies, with a spokesperson noting that both organizations were "unified in our mission to provide the same world-class care to anyone and everyone who needs it. No questions asked." New York City's Commission on Human Rights subsequently closed an investigation into the hospital after finding no evidence it had discriminated against patients. The group's departure was hailed as a victory by LGBTQ rights activists.

Hedge fund manager Whitney Tilson, who volunteered his time and money to help build the field hospital, said that though he found the positions of the group on sexuality "abhorrent", in his view, helping the Covid response was more important than protesting the group's ideologies. He said: "I'll have the ideological discussions with them later. If they're here saving my fellow New Yorkers' lives, and not even asking to be paid for it, then I will absolutely help them do that."

Joint plans between Mount Sinai Hospital, Samaritan's Purse and the Episcopal Diocese of New York to convert the Cathedral of St. John the Divine into a 200-bed hospital were shelved on April 9, 2020. Although this decision was attributed at least in part to the assessment that virus-related hospitalizations had already plateaued, Bishop Andrew M.L. Dietsche of the Episcopal Diocese of New York later said that Graham's "exclusionary" and "narrow" attitude about Christianity was central to the decision. Specifically, Samaritan's Purse requires its employees to oppose gay marriage, which, in Dietsche's words, was incompatible with the work the New York Diocese had done "around the full inclusion of gay and lesbian people." In a story detailing Franklin Graham's response to the controversy, The New York Times cited Graham as saying that Samaritan's Purse has never discriminated against a patient. He also said that the organization had a legal right to hire staff who share their Christian beliefs because it is a religious charity.
