= Dave Cooke (businessman) =

British businessman (born 1954)

- Born: 1954 (age 71–72); Chester, England
- Occupation: Charity worker

Dave Cooke (born c. 1954) is a British businessman. He is the founder of two charities: Operation Christmas Child and Teams4U.

Cooke founded the charity Operation Christmas Child (now Samaritan's Purse) in 1990 and developed, then worked for, the biggest shoebox programme in the world.

== Early years ==
Cooke was born in Chester, the second child of John and Ruth Cooke. His father worked in sales and his mother ran the household. He was brought up in the Exclusive Brethren church but found growing up in the Brethren very restrictive, and he rebelled from an early age.

He attended Hoole Secondary Modern but left at the age of 14 with no qualifications and several brushes with the law. Mr Fox, his headteacher at the time, said "Cooke, you will never achieve anything with your life."

Cooke trained to be a joiner and had his own glazing company.

In 1981, Cooke had his own kitchen design and fitting business which failed in less than two years. He then went on to establish a window installation company which grew nationally and was bought out in 1986. From 1986, Cooke worked as a contracts manager for Rowcroft Windows until 1995, when he became a Projects Manager and Children's Advocate for Samaritan's Purse.

== Charitable work ==
In October 1990, Cooke was having a meal with a good friend John Roberts and suggested they take a truck to Romania with aid for the orphans there. The news had recently broken of Ceausescu orphanages and the images of the children were appearing on television. He rounded up his friends John Roberts and Dai Hughes alongside his brother Paul Cooke to help. Operation Christmas Child hit the headlines and snowballed in a matter of months. In December 1990, a convoy of 9 trucks departed Wrexham through a crowd of support with a marching band, heading for Romania with over £600,000 of aid.

From 1990 to 1995, Operation Christmas Child grew exponentially, delivering shoeboxes to Belarus, Bosnia and Romania. In 1995, negotiations started with the American International charity Samaritan's Purse who had the means of taking OCC global and the charities were merged. Cooke continued to work for Samaritan's Purse until 2006, in various roles as HIV advocate in Africa, international child advocate and an international projects manager developing the "Second Chance" programme which involved going into prisons and reaching out to juveniles and young adults through empowerment and sports.

In 2006, Cooke founded Teams4U, an international humanitarian aid charity based in Wrexham who take volunteers overseas to facilitate health, education, training and empowerment programs in Africa, Asia and Eastern Europe. In 2013, Teams4U launched its own national shoebox program bringing Christmas gifts to deprived children in Eastern Europe.

== Awards ==
- Nominated for the St David's Award 2016 for Charitable Work
- Awarded an Honorary Doctorate from Salford University
