= Greeter =

Person who welcomes people in their city, region, or store

Greeters are volunteers who welcome tourists in their city or region, and show them around for free as they would do with friends or family. It is a form of social tourism; the residents participate in the activities of the tourists, and tourists get to see the local life of the place visited. During a walk through the city, a Greeter will not only point out interesting or unknown places, but also talk about daily life in the city and listen to what the guests have to say about their hometown.

The term "greeter" may also refer to a person whose job is to greet customers entering a store, such as a Walmart greeter. Some other institutions have greeters, such as universities, although the title is not consistent.

== History ==
The first Greeter initiative was New York's Big Apple Greeters, founded by Lynn Brooks in 1992. It was hoped that the program, sponsored by Manhattan borough president Ruth Messinger, would improve New York's reputation as a "dangerous, expensive and overwhelming" place by letting tourists see it through the eyes of its residents. This idea soon spread to a variety of tourist destinations across the world.

There are currently two Greeter websites: internationalgreeter.org (formerly globalgreeternetwork.com) is operated by the International Greeter Association, established in May 2019.

== See also ==
- Eiler Larsen - Town greeter of Laguna Beach, California (1890-1975)
