= Jakob Green Jensen =

Danish handball player (born 1982)

Personal information
- Full name: Jakob Green Jensen
- Nationality: Danish (Denmark)
- Born: 10 July 1982 (age 44) Næstved, Denmark
- Height: 1.87 m (6 ft 2 in)

Sport
- Sport: Handball
- Position: Left back
- Current club: Team Sydhavsøerne
- Number: 21

Senior clubs
- Years: Team
- –2002: TMS Ringsted
- 2002–2008: GOG
- 2008–2011: AG København
- 2011–2015: Team Tvis Holstebro
- 2015-2017: Team Sydhavsøerne
National team
Years	Team	Apps	(Gls)
2003-2011	Denmark	13	(16)

Teams managed
- 2021-2022: Team Sydhavsøerne
- 2022-: Team Sydhavsøerne

Jakob Green Jensen (born 10 July 1982) is a Danish former handballer and current handball coach,. He has two times won the Danish championship with GOG Svendborg, and with AG København he won the Danish championship and Danish Cup.

In 2015 he left Team Tvis Holstebro and joined Team Sydhavsøerne in the Danish first division.

He has played 13 matches for the Danish national handball team.

In 2021 he became the manager of his former club Team Sydhavsøerne. Only a year later he stepped back and became the assistant coach instead under Klavs Bruun Jørgensen. In 2024 he extended his contract until 2026.
