= Mary Damron =

American missionary (1954–2024)

- Born: April 17, 1954; Columbus, Ohio, U.S.
- Died: December 26, 2024 (aged 70); Athens, West Virginia, U.S.
- Other names: Mama Gump, The Shoebox Lady
- Occupations: Missionary, volunteer
- Years active: 1994–2024
- Spouse: Ted Damron (m. 1972; died 2020)
- Children: 3

Mary Jean Damron (April 17, 1954 – December 26, 2024), also known as The Shoebox Lady or Mama Gump, was an American volunteer and missionary who was best known for her global work with Christian humanitarian aid organization Samaritan's Purse and the Operation Christmas Child program.

As part of her work with Operation Christmas Child, Damron traveled to more than 40 countries and four continents, and assisted in the delivery of gift-filled shoeboxes to children afflicted by war, famine, and poverty.

== Early life ==
Damron was born on April 17, 1954, in Columbus, Ohio, to Arthur Sprouse and Emma Jean Carlson. She resided in Ikes Fork, West Virginia for most of her life, and was stricken by poverty during her childhood. She attended Ikes Fork Freewill Baptist Church, where she said a pastor of the church told her that Jesus loved her, which sparked her desire to serve Jesus.

== Humanitarian work ==
In 1993, Damron viewed an episode of Paul and Jan Crouch's television program on Trinity Broadcasting Network promoting Operation Christmas Child, a program of Samaritan's Purse. The clip featured Franklin Graham, President of Samaritan's Purse, delivering shoeboxes packed with gifts to children in war-torn Bosnia, during the Bosnian War. Damron, heartsick for the children of Bosnia and the famished children of Africa, began collecting shoeboxes in Wyoming and McDowell counties in West Virginia, often called "the poorest counties in West Virginia".

By Thanksgiving Day 1994, Mary had collected 1,258 (Note: Damron claims 1,258 shoeboxes. Other sources claim 1,256.) shoeboxes, and transported them in a cargo truck with her son, Tad, to the Samaritan's Purse headquarters in Boone, North Carolina. Franklin Graham was alerted of the unexpected delivery, and arrived at the headquarters – where he met Mary. Mary greeted Graham with “Brother Graham, I’m Mary. I got you [sic] some shoeboxes for God. Where do you want them [sic]?”

Graham was shocked by the amount of shoeboxes which Damron had brought, and offered to take Mary to Bosnia to hand-deliver the shoeboxes. Graham expressed concern and warned Mary that she would be going into a warzone in Bosnia, which was at the peak of war – and that she would need a bulletproof vest, after which Mary said: “What for [sic]? I got the Holy Spirit of God, young man. I’ve got holy angels all around me, the Spirit of God in me, and Jesus walking with me every step of the way. I’ll be alright!”

Damron accompanied other missionaries to Sarajevo during the 1994 Christmas season, where she delivered her first round of shoebox gifts to the needful children of war-torn Bosnia. In Sarajevo, Damron claimed she "could hear people being killed" outside her hostel, along with explosions from the active war; and that [they] had visited a schoolhouse full of injured children which had been continuously bombed in an attack.

Damron took a particular liking to the children of Bosnia, particularly because of their affliction in dealing with poverty, hunger and fear due to the Bosnian War.

In 1995, Damron received a call from The White House. At first, Damron believed it was a prank call, until the caller finally convinced her that the call was authentic. Then-president Bill Clinton invited her to The White House to attend and speak at a press conference regarding humanitarian relief efforts in Bosnia and Herzegovina. During the press conference, Damron spoke about Operation Christmas Child and her civilian work in Bosnia, alongside President Clinton.

When Damron met the president, she handed him an empty shoebox and asked him to fill it with gifts for a child. She then asked him, “Mr. President [sic], do you care [sic] if I pray for you?”. She then proceeded to lead a prayer in the Oval Office. Mary delivered the shoeboxes packed by President Clinton and First Lady Hillary Clinton to a 7-year-old girl named Zlada in Bosnia who had lost a leg in an artillery attack.

From 1994 until her death, Damron traveled to 42 countries delivering shoebox gifts to children in war-torn and impoverished zones. She also oversaw the packing and distribution of hundreds of thousands of Operation Christmas Child shoeboxes in West Virginia and the surrounding areas as the Regional Director for the West Virginia region.

== Ministry ==
In the early 2000s, Damron became a public speaker and began travelling to churches around the United States promoting Operation Christmas Child. She served as the national spokesperson for the Operation Christmas Child program prior to her death in 2024.

Damron's work has resulted in the distribution of millions of OCC shoeboxes worldwide.

== Legacy ==
Damron earned the name "Mama Gump," which was coined by her son Tad after she was invited to The White House: “You saw Brother Graham on the TV, went out and got some shoeboxes, took them [sic] down there [sic] to Carolina, you got sent off to Bosnia [sic], and now the President's [sic] done called you to Washington. You’re nothing but a Mama Gump," Tad said, referencing the 1994 film Forrest Gump. The nickname has been used to refer to her in media, along with "The Shoebox Lady" and "Hillbilly Angel".

On April 6, 2013, Mary attended an Operation Christmas Child event celebrating 100 million OCC shoeboxes, and sang a rendition of "God on the Mountain" on-stage with musicians Ricky Skaggs, Tommy Coomes and Dennis Agajanian, along with Franklin Graham.

Damron's story was featured in Franklin Graham's 1998 book Living Beyond the Limits: A Life in Sync with God.

The Habitat for Humanity branch of Somerset, Kentucky began constructing the "Mama Gump House" shortly after her death. The house will include artifacts and memorabilia of Damron's life.

== Personal life and death ==
Damron married Ted Damron in 1972, with whom she had three children, along with 10 grandchildren and 10 great-grandchildren. Ted died on December 27, 2020, at the age of 72. Ted also volunteered for Operation Christmas Child during his life.

Mary Damron battled cancer for many years.

She died from complications of cancer on December 26, 2024, at the age of 70. Samaritan's Purse paid tribute to Damron with a news release on their website, and Franklin Graham paid tribute to Damron on social media, calling her a "a great warrior for children and the Gospel."
