= List of mayors of Aarhus =

This is a list of mayors of Aarhus, Denmark since the first mayor was appointed 1886. All but one elected mayors of Aarhus have belonged to the Social Democratic Party.

#	Name	Took office	Left office	Political Party
	Anders Winnerskjold	2024	Incumbent	Social Democrats
37	Jacob Bundsgaard	2011	2024	Social Democrats
21	Nicolai Wammen	2006	2011	Social Democrats
20	Louise Gade	2002	2005	Venstre
19	Flemming Knudsen	1997	2001	Social Democrats
18	Thorkild Simonsen	1982	1997	Social Democrats
17	Orla Hyllested	1971	1981	Social Democrats
16	Bernhardt Jensen	1958	1971	Social Democrats
15	Svend Unmack Larsen	1945	1958	Social Democrats
14	Einar Stecher Christensen	1942	1945	Social Democrats
13	Hans Peder Christensen	1933	1941	Social Democrats
12	Jakob Jensen	1919	1932	Social Democrats
11	Ernst Christopher L. Drechsel	1905	1919	Appointed
10	Frederik Christian Bernhard S. Vestergaard	1886	1905	Appointed
