= Walmart greeter =

Employee greeting those who enter the store

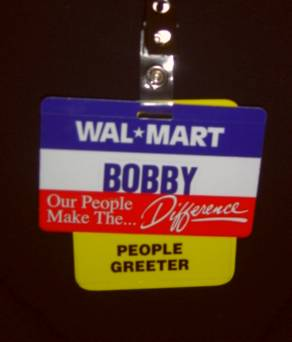
- Walmart greeter badge

Occupation
- Names: People greeter; Customer host
- Occupation type: Employment
- Activity sectors: Retail

Description
- Fields of employment: Walmart
- Related jobs: Greeter

A Walmart greeter is an employee whose role is to wait at the front door of a Walmart store and greet all shoppers who enter. CEO and founder Sam Walton implemented the role nationally in the 1980s. The position is considered to be a big part of the company's identity and culture, as well as one of its most recognized hallmarks.

A Walmart greeter stands at the door. The greeter's primary task is to cross-check customers' receipts when they leave, as well as to provide a sunny disposition to welcome customers.

== History ==
The concept of having dedicated greeters at the front door of a store may have originated from an employee of the company, Lois Richard. She was working in the early 1980s as an invoice clerk at the Walmart store in Crowley, Louisiana. The Walmart store in Crowley, which had opened in 1980, was experiencing shoplifting and had a significant "inventory shrinkage" after two years. The initial idea was to have an employee standing at the door in order to try to decrease shoplifting. After a shoplifting sting conducted by the local police showed that piles of merchandise could have been taken away, Richard pitched the idea the next day to her manager and it was accepted.

In 2019, it was announced that on April 26, greeters would be replaced with 'customer hosts' at 1,000 stores. This new position will require that hosts be able to climb up ladders to get products, lift packages weighing 25 pounds, and stand for long periods of time. The announced change was met with disapproval by disabled greeters. Walmart announced that it would make "every effort" to continue to employ disabled workers in other positions.

During the COVID-19 pandemic Walmart greeters gained increased importance because of the fact they had to enforce and remind customers of store mask mandates.

== Bibliography ==
- Soderquist, Don (2005). "A Friendly Idea". The Wal-Mart Way: The Inside Story of the Success of the World's Largest Company. Thomas Nelson. p. 240. ISBN 978-0785261193.
