= Flemming Knudsen =

Danish politician (born 1946)

- Born: 31 May 1946 (age 79); Aarhus, Denmark
- Occupation: Politician

Flemming Knudsen (born 31 May 1946) is a Danish politician and former mayor from Aarhus. He was a member of Aarhus City Council between 1986 and 2009 and the mayor of Aarhus between 1997 and 2001. In 2009 he was elected for the council of the Central Denmark Region where he became a member of the business Committee. Flemming Knudsen has been involved with many local organizations, especially sports where he has been chairman of a local handball chapter between 1972 and 1980.

== Life ==
Flemming Knudsen was born in the Aarhus suburb Viby where he attended Rosenvangskolen and obtained the Mellemskoleeksamen in 1962 and Realeksamen in 1963. In 1969 he got a degree as a school teacher from Marselisborg Seminarium. In 1969 to 1970 he worked as a teacher at Vestergårdskolen and in 1970 to 1993 he was employed at Næshøjskolen in Harlev. In 1986 his political career got underway as he was elected to Aarhus City council. He has since served as mayor and in a number of public functions. Knudsen was married 25 July 2000 to Lisbet Lautrup Knudsen.

== Political career ==
- 1959: Member of Social Democratic Youth of Denmark
- 1964: Member of the Social Democrats
- 1986–2009: Member of Aarhus City Council
- 1990–1993: Chairman of the Social Democratic council group and political speaker
- 1993: Alderman for the 1. Department of the magistrate
- 1994–1997: Councillor for the 4. Department of the magistrate
- 1997–2001: Mayor of Aarhus Municipality
- 2002–2005: Councillor for the 1. Department of the magistrate
- 2002–2005: Vice Mayor of Aarhus Municipality
- 2006–2009: Councillor for the magistrate department of Culture Service in Aarhus Municipality
- 2009: Elected to the region council for Central Denmark Region for the Social Democrats
- 2010: Member of the business Committee in Central Denmark Region

== See also ==
- List of mayors of Aarhus
